= Kazakhstan =

Country in Eastern Europe and Central Asia

Republic of Kazakhstan: Қазақстан Республикасы; Qazaqstan Respublikasy (Kazakh); Республика Казахстан (Russian)
- Flag Emblem
- Anthem: Қазақстан Республикасының Мемлекеттік гимні Qazaqstan Respublikasynyñ Memlekettık gimnı "State Anthem of the Republic of Kazakhstan"
- Capital: Astana; 51°8′N 71°26′E
- Largest city: Almaty; 43°14′N 76°57′E
- Official languages: Kazakh (Note: National language in all aspects of the whole territory of the state and in its international relations); Russian (Note: Recognized as an official language and can be used in government institutions and organizations alongside state language)
- Ethnic groups (2026): 71.5% Kazakh; 14.4% Russian; 3.4% Uzbek; 1.8% Ukrainian; 1.5% Uyghur; 1.1% German; 1.1% Tatar; 5.2% other
- Religion (2021): 69.3% Islam; 17.2% Christianity; 2.3% no religion; 0.2% other; 11.0% unanswered
- Demonym: Kazakh • Kazakhstani
- Government: Unitary presidential republic (Note: Although the constitution stipulates that Kazakhstan has a presidential system, it is de facto a semi-presidential system.) under an authoritarian government
  - President: Kassym-Jomart Tokayev
  - Vice President: Erlan Karin
  - Prime Minister: Oljas Bektenov
- Legislature: Kurultai

Formation
  - Golden Horde: c. 1225
  - Kazakh Khanate: c. 1465
  - Abolition of the khanate: 3 August 1822
  - Alash Autonomy: 13 December 1917
  - Kazakh ASSR: 26 August 1920
  - Kazakh SSR: 5 December 1936
  - Independence from the Soviet Union: 16 December 1991
  - Recognized: 26 December 1991
  - Current constitution: 15 March 2026

Area
  - Total: 2,724,910 km^{2} (1,052,090 sq mi) (9th)
  - Water (%): 1.7

Population
  - August 2026 estimate: ▲20,604,819 (65th)
  - Density: 7.63/km^{2} (19.8/sq mi) (236th)
- GDP (PPP): 2026 estimate
  - Total: ▲$996.311 billion (36th)
  - Per capita: ▲$48,351 (49th)
- GDP (nominal): 2026 estimate
  - Total: ▲$397.921 billion (47th)
  - Per capita: ▲$19,311 (64th)
- Gini (2018): ▲27.8 low inequality
- HDI (2023): ▲0.837 very high (60th)
- Currency: Tenge (₸) (KZT)
- Time zone: UTC+5
- Calling code: +7
- ISO 3166 code: KZ
- Internet TLD: .kz; .қаз

Kazakhstan, (Note: Kazakh: Қазақстан, Qazaqstan, pronounced [qɑzɑqsˈtɑn]; Russian: Казахстан, romanized: Kazakhstan, pronounced [kəzɐxˈstan]) officially the Republic of Kazakhstan, (Note: Kazakh: Қазақстан Республикасы, Qazaqstan Respublikasy; Russian: Республика Казахстан, romanized: Respublika Kazakhstan) is a landlocked country situated primarily in Central Asia, with a portion of its territory extending into Eastern Europe. (Note: About 4% of Kazakhstan's territory, west of the Ural River, lies in Eastern Europe.) It borders Russia to the north and west, China to the east, Kyrgyzstan to the southeast, Uzbekistan to the south, and Turkmenistan to the southwest, and it has a coastline along the Caspian Sea. The capital is Astana, and the country's largest city and principal cultural and economic center is Almaty, which served as the capital until 1997.

Kazakhstan is the world's ninth-largest country by land area and the largest landlocked country. Hilly plateaus and plains account for nearly half its vast territory, with lowlands composing another third; its southern and eastern frontiers are composed of mountainous regions. Kazakhstan has a population of 20.6 million and one of the lowest population densities in the world, with fewer than 8 people per square kilometre (21 people/mi^{2}). Ethnic Kazakhs constitute a majority, while ethnic Russians form a significant minority. Officially secular, Kazakhstan is a Muslim-majority country with a sizeable Christian community.

Kazakhstan has been inhabited since the Paleolithic era. In antiquity, various nomadic Iranian peoples such as the Saka, Massagetae, and Scythians. Turkic nomads entered the region from the sixth century. In the 13th century, the area was subjugated by the Mongol Empire under Genghis Khan. Following the disintegration of the Golden Horde in the 15th century, the Kazakh Khanate was established over an area roughly corresponding with modern Kazakhstan. By the 18th century, the Kazakh Khanate had fragmented into three jüz (tribal divisions), which were gradually absorbed and conquered by the Russian Empire; by the mid-19th century, all of Kazakhstan was nominally under Russian rule. Following the 1917 Russian Revolution and subsequent Russian Civil War, it became an autonomous republic of the Russian SFSR within the Soviet Union. Its status was elevated to that of a union republic in 1936. The Soviet government settled Russians and other ethnicities in the republic, which resulted in ethnic Kazakhs being a minority during the Soviet era. Kazakhstan was the last constituent republic of the Soviet Union to declare independence in 1991 during its dissolution.

Kazakhstan dominates Central Asia both economically and politically, accounting for 60% of the region's GDP, primarily through its oil and gas industry; it also has vast mineral resources, ranking among the highest producers of iron and silver in the world. Kazakhstan also has the highest Human Development Index ranking in the region. It is a unitary constitutional republic; however, its government is authoritarian. Nevertheless, there have been incremental efforts at democratization and political reform since the resignation of Nursultan Nazarbayev in 2019, who had led the country since independence. Kazakhstan is a member state of the United Nations (UN), World Trade Organization (WTO), the World Health Organization (WHO), Commonwealth of Independent States (CIS), Shanghai Cooperation Organization (SCO), Eurasian Economic Union (EAEU), Collective Security Treaty Organization (CSTO), Organization for Security and Cooperation in Europe (OSCE), Organization of Islamic Cooperation (OIC), Organization of Turkic States (OTS), International Organization of Turkic Culture and Special Guest status with the Council of Europe Parliamentary Assembly.

== Etymology ==
According to the most widely accepted theory, the word qazaq (Kazakh) derives from a Turkic root meaning "free", "independent", or "wanderer". The name Kazakhstan adds the word stan, meaning settlement.

The Turkic word qazaq (قازاق) was reliably recorded in 13th–14th century dictionaries, including the Codex Cumanicus and a Mamluk-Kipchak Arabic dictionary published by Martin Houtsma. In these sources, the word meant "unattached", "homeless", "loner", or "exile", and later acquired the meaning "free man".

In Turko-Persian sources, the term Özbek-Qazaq first appeared during the mid-16th century, in the Tarikh-i-Rashidi by Mirza Muhammad Haidar Dughlat, a Chagatayid prince of Kashmir, which locates Kazakh in the eastern part of Desht-i Qipchaq. According to Vasily Bartold, the Kazakhs likely began using that name during the 15th century.

The English word Kazakh, meaning a member of the Kazakh people, derives from Russian: казах. The native name is қазақ, qazaq. It might originate from the Turkic word verb qaz-, 'to wander', reflecting the Kazakhs' nomadic culture. The term Cossack is of the same origin.

Though Kazakh traditionally referred only to ethnic Kazakhs, including those living in China, Russia, Turkey, Uzbekistan, and other neighbouring countries, the term is increasingly being used to refer to any inhabitant of Kazakhstan, including residents of other ethnicities. In the Kazakh language, the country is called Qazaqstan in the Latin script.

== History ==
=== Antiquity ===
Kazakhstan has been inhabited since the Paleolithic era. The Botai culture (3700–3100 BC) is credited with the first domestication of horses. The Botai population derived most of their ancestry from a deeply European-related population known as Ancient North Eurasians, while also displaying some Ancient East Asian admixture. Pastoralism developed during the Neolithic. The population was Caucasoid during the Bronze and Iron Age period.

The Kazakh territory was a key constituent of the Eurasian trading Steppe Route, the ancestor of the terrestrial Silk Roads. Archaeologists believe that humans first domesticated the horse in the region's vast steppes. During recent prehistoric times, Central Asia was inhabited by groups such as the possibly Indo-European Afanasievo culture, later early Indo-Iranian cultures such as Andronovo, and later Indo-Iranians such as the Saka and Massagetae. Other groups included the nomadic Scythians and the Persian Achaemenid Empire in the southern territory of the modern country. The Andronovo and Srubnaya cultures, precursors to the peoples of the Scythian cultures, were found to harbour mixed ancestry from the Yamnaya Steppe herders and peoples of the Central European Middle Neolithic.

=== Turkic period ===
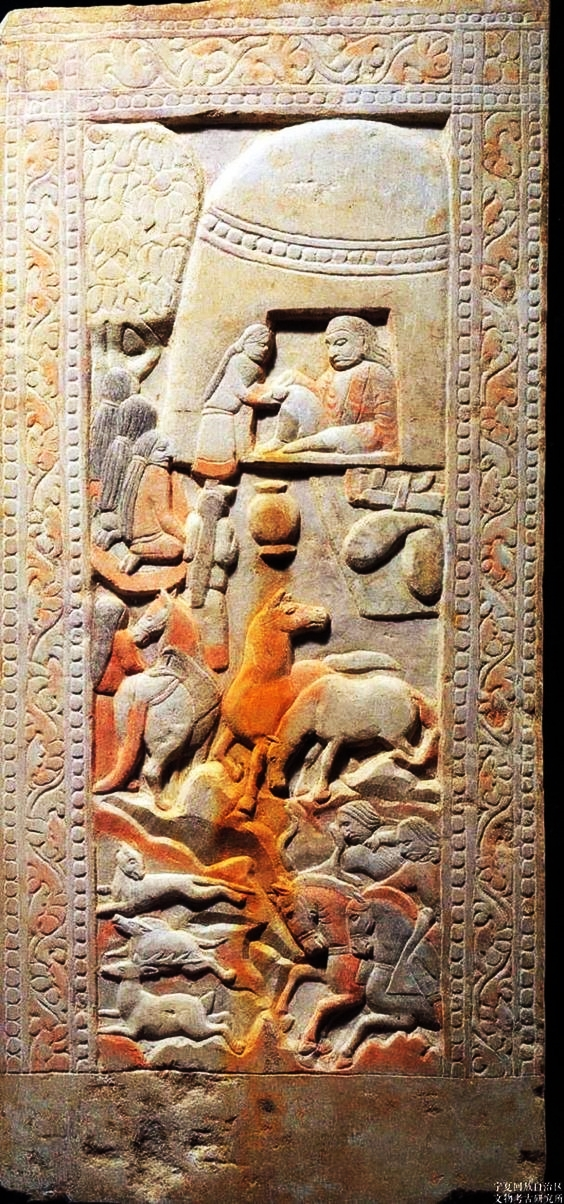
Funerary depiction of long-haired Göktürks in the Kazakh Steppe. Miho funerary couch, c. 570 CE.

The main migrations of the Turkic peoples took place between the 5th and 11th centuries, during which Turkic-speaking groups spread across much of Central Asia. Over time, they gradually assimilated or replaced many of the earlier Iranian-speaking populations, transforming Central Asia from a predominantly Iranian region into one largely Turkic-speaking.

Medieval statehood on the territory of present-day Kazakhstan began to emerge with the establishment of the Turkic Khaganate in the mid-6th century. In 630, the Eastern Turkic Khaganate was defeated by the Chinese and incorporated into the Tang dynasty. In 658, the Western Turkic Khaganate suffered a similar fate after its defeat by Tang forces. Turkic political power was later restored when Kutlug Ilterish Qaghan revived the Eastern Turkic Khaganate in 682. On the territory of the former Western Turkic Khaganate, the Turgesh Khaganate emerged in 699 under the leadership of Üch-elik. The Turgesh actively resisted the Arab expansion into Central Asia during the 720s and 730s, but were ultimately defeated in the mid-8th century. During the same period, the Eastern Turkic Khaganate fragmented as a result of internal conflicts and political disunity.

From the 8th to the early 13th centuries, the territory of Kazakhstan was successively dominated by the Karluks, Oghuz, Kimeks, and Kipchaks. In southern Kazakhstan, the Karluks established a new khaganate in 840, although their rulers retained the title of yabghu. They later came under pressure from the Samanid Empire and eventually became associated with the rise of the Karakhanid state. The Oghuz tribes established themselves in the Aral Sea region and made Yangikent (Dzhankent) their capital. Despite attempts at political consolidation, internal conflicts weakened the Oghuz state. Between the 9th and 11th centuries, much of western and central Kazakhstan came under the control of the Kimek Khanate, whose rulers adopted the title of khagan. The Kimek state was eventually conquered by the Kipchaks. The Kipchaks, known in East Slavic chronicles as the Polovtsians, became one of the dominant powers of the Eurasian steppe. Their ruling elites played an influential role in the politics of Khwarazm, and by the 12th century Kipchak cavalry had become a major military force within the Khwarazmian Empire. They contributed significantly to the empire's expansion, including the conquest of the Karakhanid state and neighbouring Central Asian territories. In 1218, however, Khwarazm came into conflict with Genghis Khan, leading to the Mongol conquest of the region and its incorporation into the Mongol Empire.

=== Golden Horde ===
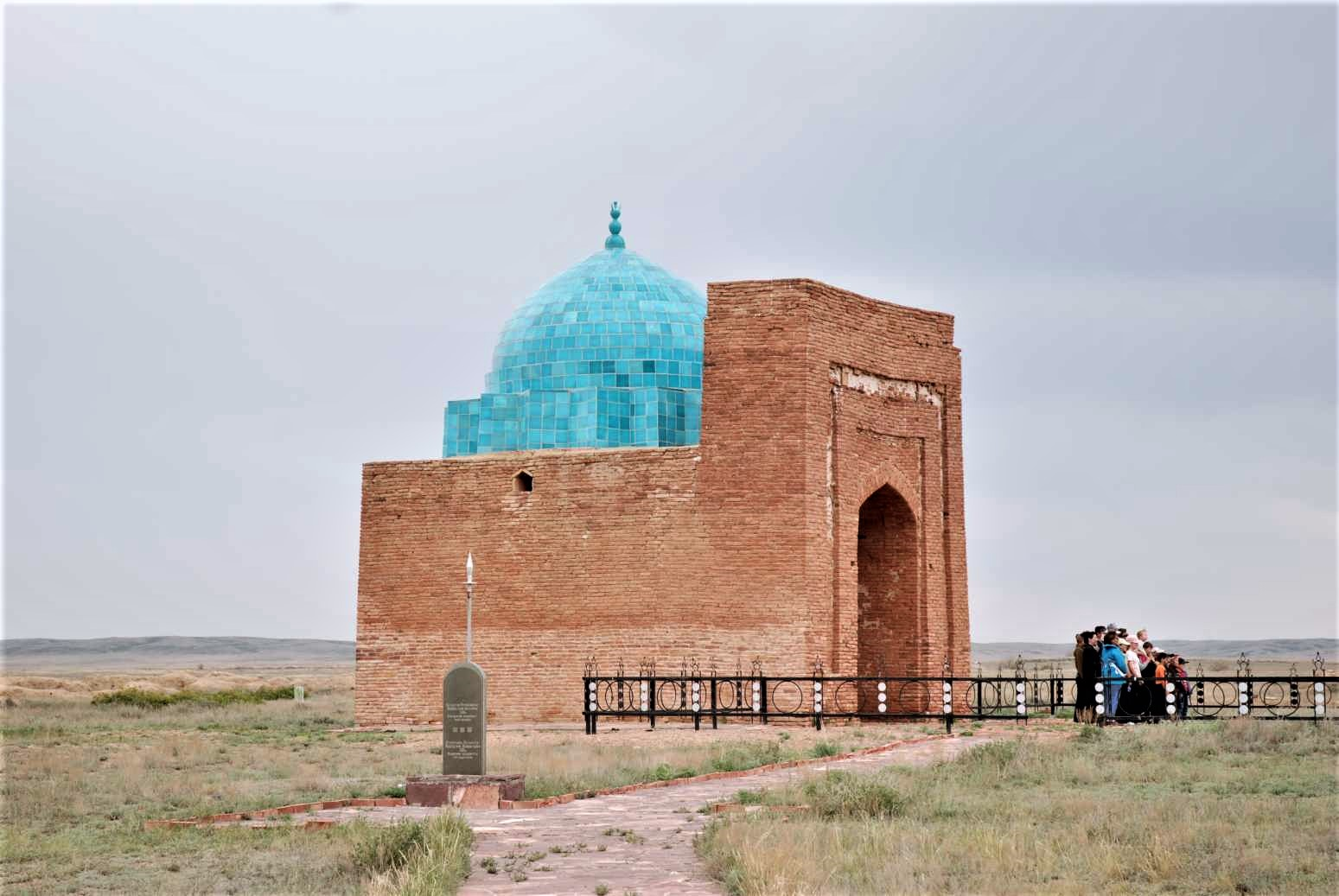
Jochi Mausoleum, Ulytau Region, Kazakhstan

The history of the Golden Horde occupies an important place in modern Kazakh historiography. It was within the framework of this state that the formation of the Kazakh ethnic group took place. In contemporary Kazakh historiography, the Golden Horde is regarded as an important part of the historical continuity of Kazakh statehood. Some Russian historians have also linked the beginnings of Kazakh state formation to the period of the Golden Horde, emphasizing its significant role in this process. Scholars such as Marie Favereau, Beatrice Forbes Manz, and Joo-Yup Lee often regard the Kazakhs as one of the successor peoples of the Golden Horde, alongside other heirs of the Jochid Ulus. According to Irina Erofeeva, Kazakh nomads viewed the rise and decline of the Golden Horde and the subsequent development of their own statehood as part of a recurring historical cycle. Kazakh oral tradition preserved this view through stories about rulers of the Jochid Ulus, including Genghis Khan, Jochi, Batu Khan, Jani Beg, Tokhtamysh, Urus Khan, and Edigu. Erofeeva argues that Kazakh nomads regarded the Golden Horde as their own state, whose successive revivals never matched its former power, giving rise to an idealised image of the Jochid Ulus that was romanticised in Kazakh society from the 18th to the 20th centuries.

However, Soviet historiography significantly shaped interpretations of Central Asia and the Golden Horde. Kazakh historian Zhaksylyk Sabitov argues that Soviet ideological censorship influenced the study of the Mongol Empire and the Golden Horde. He notes that Shoqan Walikhanov viewed the Kazakhs as descendants of the Turkic and Mongol tribes of the Jochid Ulus and wrote that they "consider themselves as the Tatars of the Golden Horde". Soviet commentators later interpreted this identification as applying primarily to the Chinggisid elite, while describing its territory as encompassing much of present-day Kazakhstan. Political repression further constrained historical scholarship, while Soviet historians sought to construct "safe" national histories for the Soviet republics. According to Irina Erofeeva, shifting ideological priorities led many Kazakh historians to alter their views or avoid sensitive subjects, including the history of the Golden Horde. Sanjar Asfendiyarov, arrested and executed in 1938, was denounced in Kazakhstanskaya Pravda as a "Japanese spy" and accused of promoting Altynsarin and Walikhanov while "replacing Kazakh history with praise of the khans". Similar censorship occurred in other Soviet republics. Auezov's niece believed that Mukhtar Auezov and Kanysh Satbayev avoided repression partly because they had Russian wives. Modern Kazakh historiography has increasingly moved away from these Soviet-era narratives, although they continue to influence some history textbooks.

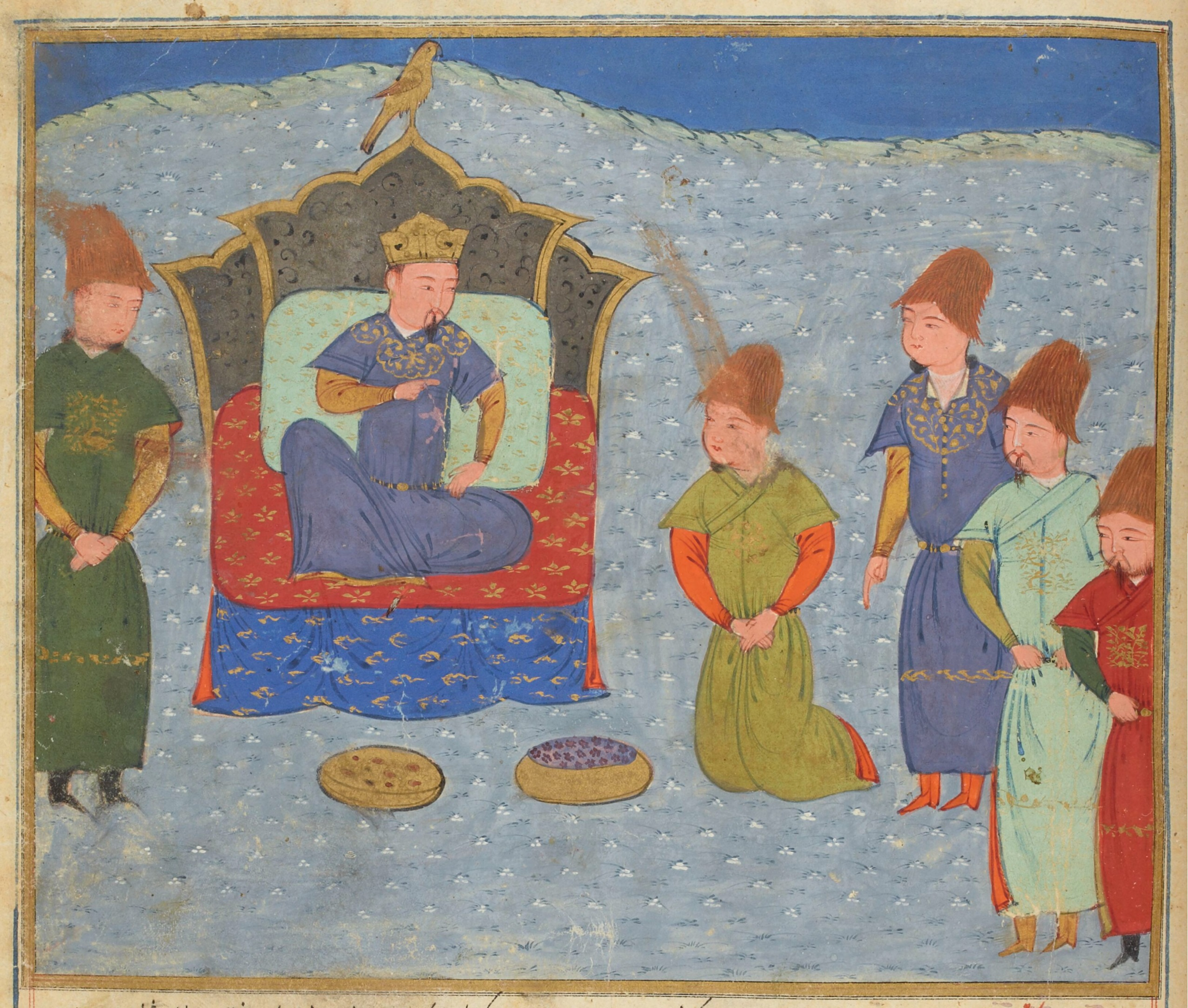
Batu Khan on the throne of the Golden Horde

At the beginning of the 13th century, the western and northern lands of present-day Kazakhstan, in the eastern Desht-i Kipchak, came under Jochi, while the south was incorporated into the Chagatai Ulus. The Ulus of Jochi was divided into two domains under Jochi's sons, Batu and Orda. Although Batu did not distinguish himself as an outstanding military commander, he proved to be a capable administrator and politician. Without undertaking any major military campaigns between 1242 and 1256, he established suzerainty over the Russian principalities, Georgia, Armenia, the Seljuk Sultanate of Rum, and several regions of Iran. He is also traditionally credited with founding a number of cities of the Golden Horde.

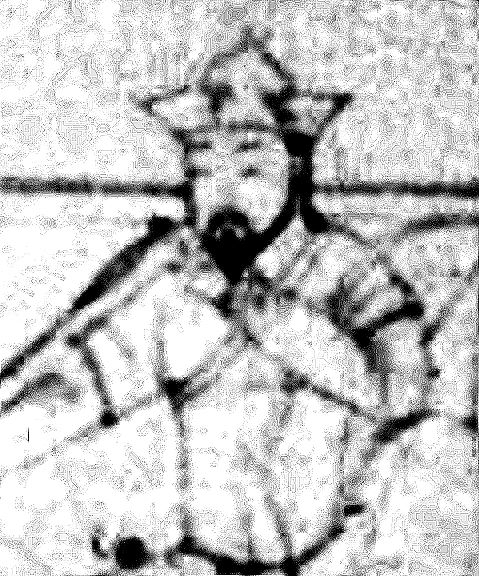
Miniature from a Timurid genealogy manuscript depicting Mengu-Timur, c. 1405–1409.

In 1269, at a kurultai on the Talas River, Mengu-Timur, Baraq, and Kaidu rejected Kublai's authority and allied against him to preserve their independence. Upon ascending the throne in 1266/1267, Möngke Temür adopted the title "The Great Khan", and the Golden Horde came to be officially known as the Ulug Ulus (lit. 'Great State' in Turkic). After the death of Mengu-Timur in 1280, his elder brother Tode Mongke succeeded him peacefully but relied heavily on powerful nobles, particularly Nogai. Nogai expanded his influence over Bulgaria, Vidin, and Serbia and maintained independent relations with the Egyptian sultan. In 1287, he backed a coup that replaced Tode Mongke with Töle Buqa, during whose reign Nogai campaigned against the Ilkhanate and Hungary. Under Özbeg Khan (r. 1313–1341), Islam became the state religion and the Golden Horde underwent administrative reforms. His son Jani Beg, who succeeded him in 1341, is often regarded in Kazakh oral tradition as the Golden Horde's "Golden Age". He ended nearly a century of conflict with the Ilkhanate by conquering parts of northern Iran, but died during a campaign in 1357, possibly murdered by his son Berdi Beg. His death marked the end of the Golden Age and the beginning of the political instability known as the Great Troubles.

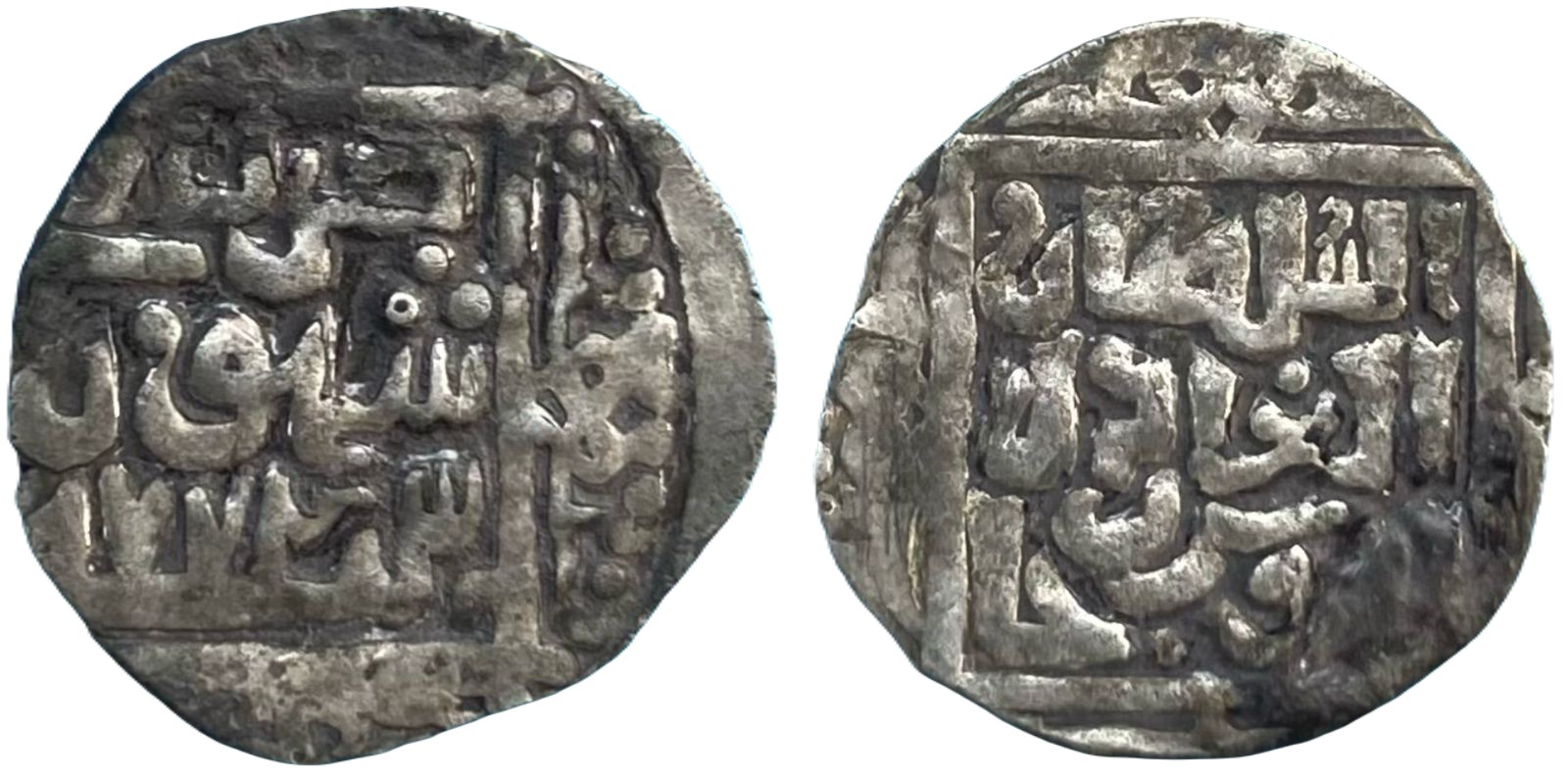
Coins of Urus Khan minted at Sayram, Kazakhstan.

In the late 1350s and early 1360s, the Golden Horde entered a period of civil strife known as the Great Troubles. The rulers of the Blue Horde asserted their independence, and the descendants of Tuqa-Timur, Jochi's thirteenth son, rose to power. The most prominent among them was Urus Khan. Advancing west from the eastern Desht-i Kipchak, Urus seized the throne at Sarai before returning to the Ulytau Mountains and the Syr Darya region. His sons Qutluq Buqa and Toktakia twice defeated Tokhtamysh, who sought refuge with Timur. Urus demanded Tokhtamysh's extradition, but Timur refused, leading to conflict. After several defeats, Timur withdrew to Samarkand and Kesh in 1376–1377. That same year, Tokhtamysh captured Sarai and reunited the Jochid territories under his rule. Tokhtamysh pursued an active foreign policy. After Mamai's defeat at the Battle of Kulikovo in 1380, Tokhtamysh invaded Russia and burned Moscow in 1382, restoring tribute to the Golden Horde. In 1383, he restored his authority over Khwarazm, and his growing imperial ambitions soon brought him into conflict with Timur. Supported by the Golden Horde nobility, Tokhtamysh expanded into the Caucasus, subduing the Jalayirids and bringing Shirvan under Horde control. He then invaded the Chagatai ulus, reached Samarkand, and defeated Timur's son Umar Shaykh before withdrawing when Timur returned. In retaliation, Timur devastated Khwarazm the following year and incorporated it into his domains.

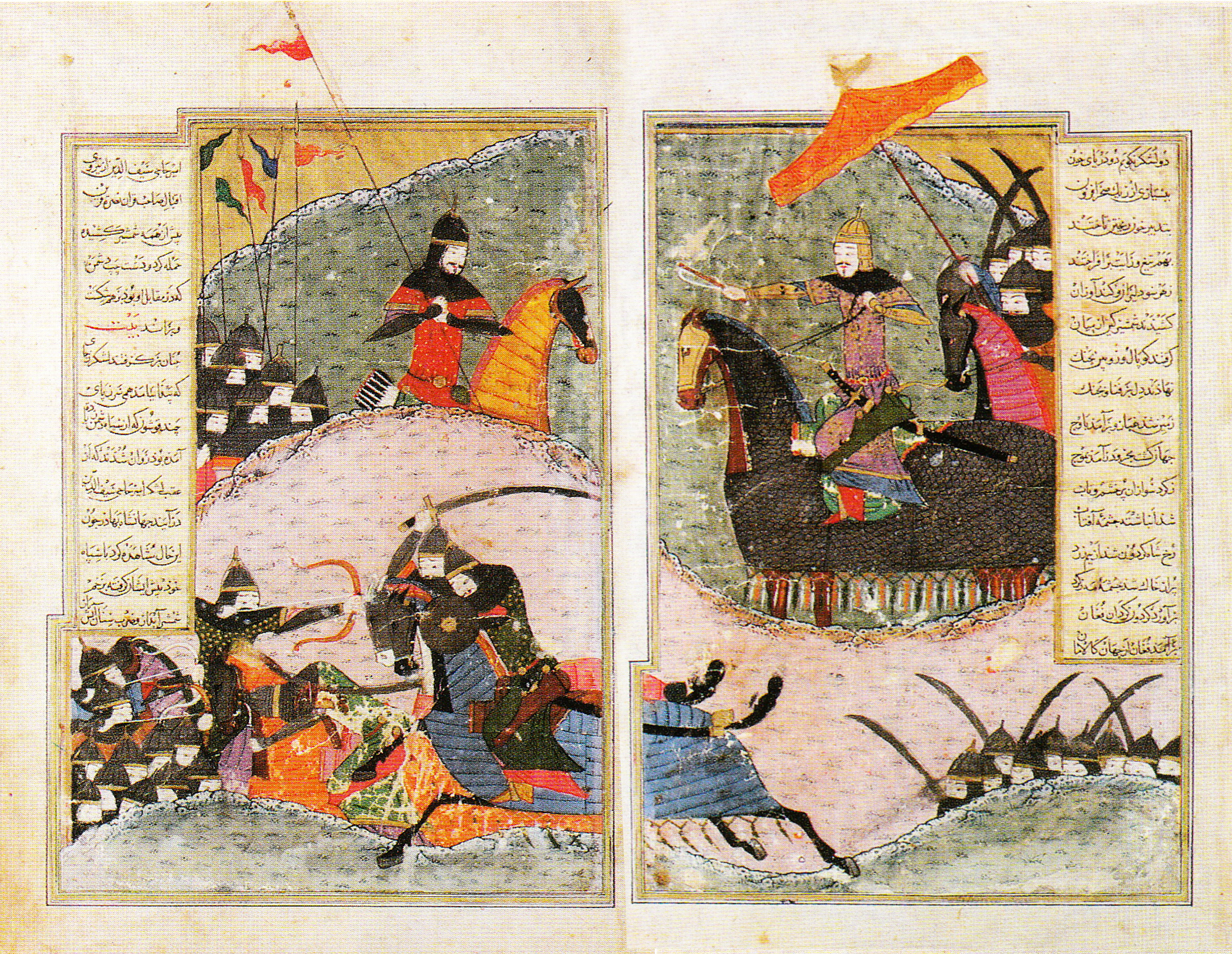
Battle between Tokhtamysh (left) and Timur (right) on 18 June 1391, from the Zafarnama ("Book of Victory").

The armies of Tokhtamysh and Timur followed the Turko-Mongol military tradition, with strict discipline and a decimal organisation of tens, hundreds, thousands, and tens of thousands (tumens). Edigu, a Manghit hostile to Tokhtamysh, secretly allied with Timur and helped organise his campaign. In 1391, Timur invaded the Dasht-i Qipchaq and defeated Tokhtamysh at the Battle of the Kondurcha River. Despite heavy losses, Timur withdrew with substantial booty, while Tokhtamysh retreated to the Volga region. By 1393, Tokhtamysh had rebuilt his forces and resumed collecting tribute from his vassals.

In 1395, the two armies clashed again at the Battle of the Terek River. Tokhtamysh initially gained the initiative, repeatedly attacking Timur's Chagatai forces before feigning retreat. However, the defection of the emir Aktau, whom Timur had bribed, weakened Tokhtamysh's left flank and allowed Timur to defeat his army. Tokhtamysh escaped but could not raise another army. Timur then devastated the Golden Horde, destroying much of its urban infrastructure, trade, and economy. His forces ravaged the North Caucasus, Volga region, and Crimea, ultimately forcing Tokhtamysh from the throne in 1395–1396.

After Tokhtamysh, no ruler achieved authority over the entire Ulus of Jochi, and the Golden Horde began to disintegrate. Timur installed descendants of Urus Khan in Sarai, but they failed to restore its former power. In 1397, Edigu allied with Temür Qutlugh, grandson of Urus Khan, and placed him on the throne while effectively ruling himself. In 1399, Tokhtamysh and his Lithuanian allies attacked Edigu but suffered a crushing defeat. Tokhtamysh later allied with the Shibanids and sought Timur's support, but never regained the throne. Both Tokhtamysh and Timur died in 1405. Soon, the Timur's empire began to disintegrate as well. In 1423–1424, Baraq Khan, grandson of Urus Khan and son of Qoyrichaq, seized power and captured Sarai after defeating Khudaydat and Ulugh Muhammad. In 1428, Ulugh Muhammad defeated Baraq, who abandoned attempts to regain power in the west and turned against the descendants of Timur in Samarqand. Аfter Baraq, power in the eastern Desht-i Kipchak passed from the Tuqa-Timurids to the Shaybanids. Baraq's son Abu Sa'id, also known as Janibek, later became a founder of the Kazakh Khanate

=== Kazakh Khanate ===
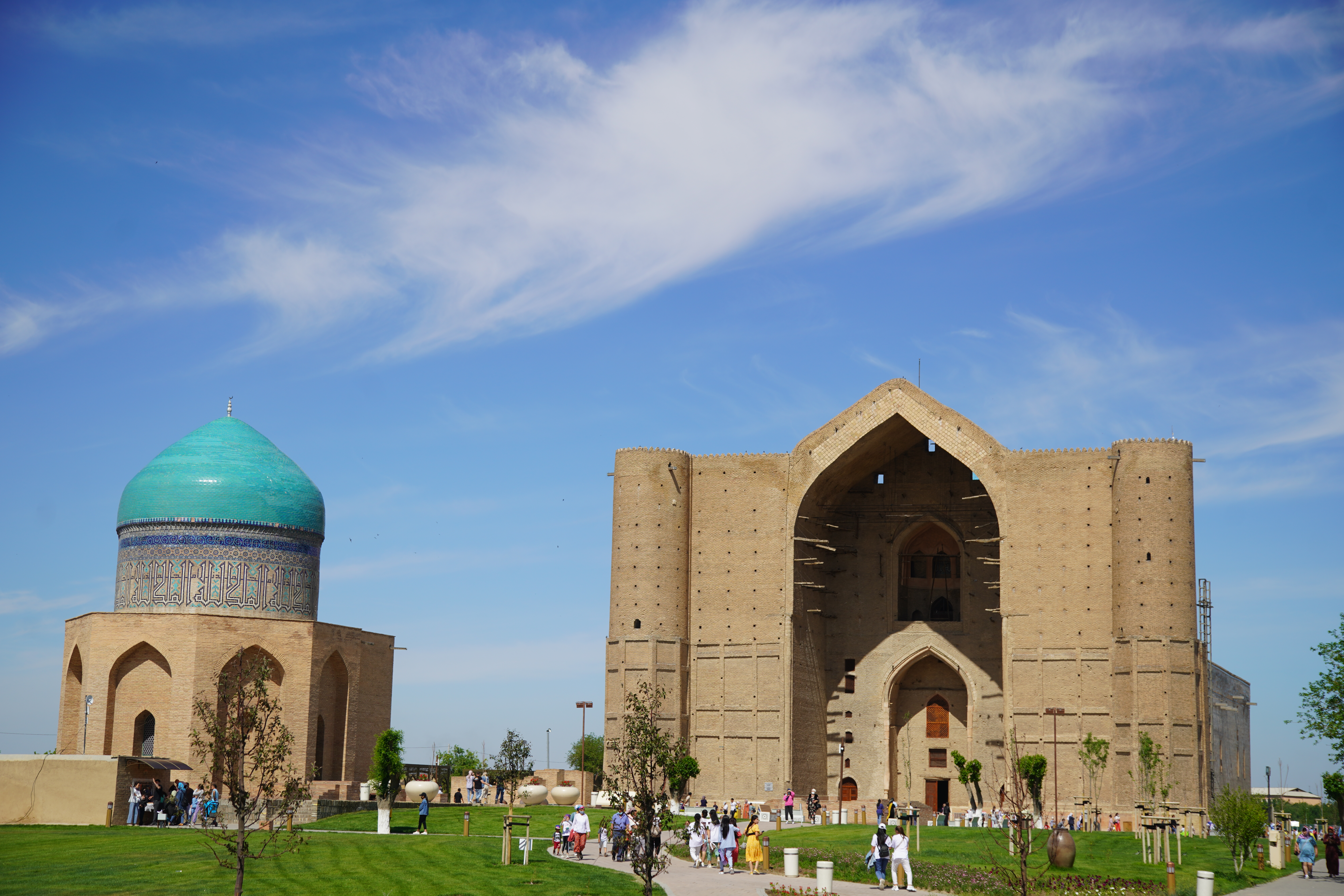
Mausoleums of Rabiga Sultān Begim and Khoja Ahmad Yasawi in the city of Turkestan

By the mid-15th century, the Golden Horde had collapsed, leading to the creation of the Kazakh Khanate by Kerei and Janibek. According to Russian sources, by the 17th century, the Kazakh Khanate was divided into three Zhuzes (Hordes)—Senior (Great), Middle (Central), and Junior—each with its own nomadic territories. In the early 16th century, the Kazakhs transformed the Khanate into a nomadic empire stretching across the steppes east of the Caspian Sea and north of the Aral Sea as far as the upper Irtysh River and the western approaches to the Altai Mountains. During the reigns of Burunduk Khan (ruled 1488–1509) and Kasym Khan (1509–18), the Kazakhs were the masters of virtually the entire steppe region, reportedly able to field 200,000 cavalry and feared by all their neighbours. Many historians consider Kasym Khan's leadership the starting point of a distinct and sovereign Kazakh state. His influence extended Kazakh authority from the southeastern regions of modern Kazakhstan to the Ural Mountains.

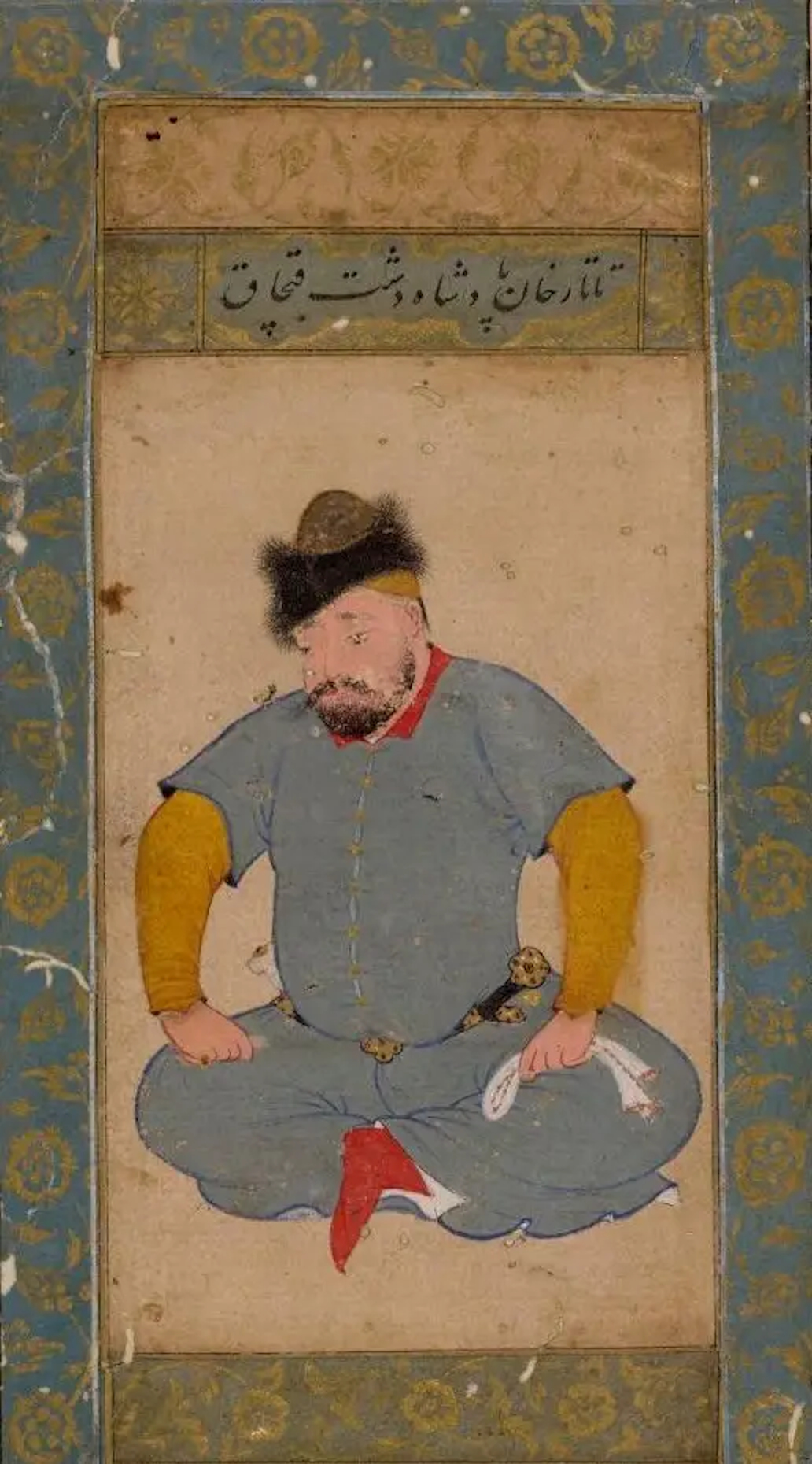
Padishah (Emperor) of Dast-i Qipchaq, (1550). Possible portrait of Kazakh khan.

However, during the successive rule (1518–1538) of the three sons of Kasym Khan, the power of the Khanate weakened somewhat, accompanied by a trend that later intensified: the disintegration of the Khanate into three separate "hordes". The youngest son of Kasym Khan, Haq-Nazar Khan, who ruled the Kazakh steppes, managed to overcome these difficulties. By restoring the unity of the three Hordes, he began systematic campaigns into Transoxiana. This policy continued under his immediate successors until the reign of Tawakul Khan, who, for a brief time, seized Samarkand. Esim Khan succeeded his brother Tawakul Khan. He fought the Bukharan khans Baki-Muhammad and Imamkuli for control of the Syr Darya and Tashkent, seeking to reunify the Kazakh Khanate. After Tursun Muhammad Khan seized power in the 1610s, Esim retreated to the Yarkent Khanate, where he ruled over part of the Kyrgyz and allied with Khan Abd ar-Rahim. In the 1620s, he defeated Tursun, restored his authority over the khanate, and suppressed the Katagan clan, which had supported Tursun. He also defeated the Oirats, temporarily bringing them under his rule, and forced Imamkuli to abandon his claims to the cities along the Syr Darya.

From 1635, the Kazakhs began waging war against the newly established Dzungar Khanate. After Jangir, Tauke Khan ascended the throne and distinguished himself as a military commander in wars against the Dzungars and the Khanate of Bukhara. He also pursued an active foreign policy, intervening in succession disputes in Moghulistan, maintaining diplomatic relations with Russia, and sending five embassies there. Conflicts with the Cossacks also occurred, including Tauke Khan's suppression of the Bulavin Rebellion. After Tauke's death in 1715/1718, the Kazakh Khanate lost its unity, and the three hordes effectively became separate khanates.

In 1723, after concluding a truce with Qing China, Tsewang Rabtan launched a surprise attack on Kazakh lands, beginning the period known as the "Great Disaster". Caught unprepared, the Kazakhs retreated, abandoning their livestock and property, while many clans fled across the Emba and Ural rivers and southward into Mawarannahr. This migration towards the Ural region became so extensive that it threatened the survival of the Kalmyk Khanate. Initially unable to organise effective resistance, the Kazakhs were led by military elites and batyrs, with organised resistance uniting the militias of all three zhuzes under Abulkhair Khan in 1726. Despite Dzungar numerical and military superiority, Kazakh forces defeated the Oirat armies in 1727–1730, preventing Tsewang Rabtan from subjugating the Kazakh zhuzes. Under his successor Galdan Tseren, Dzungar power reached its height, defeating China in 1731–1732 and subjugating the Senior zhuz in 1735.

From 1752 to 1755, the Middle zhuz fought its final wars with the Dzungars, while Ablai Sultan supported different factions and led Middle Zhuz forces in campaigns into Dzungaria. Kazakh intervention and repeated incursions further weakened Dzungar political authority and military cohesion. As a result, when the Qing Empire invaded in 1755, it encountered little serious resistance and destroyed the Dzungar Khanate as a political entity.

Approximate areas occupied by the three Kazakh jüz in the early 20th century: Junior Juz / Middle Juz / Senior Juz

The collapse of the Dzungar Khanate shifted the balance of power in Inner Asia, with the Kazakh khanates becoming the dominant regional political and military force for a time. Meanwhile, Russia and Qing China strengthened their positions and began to shape international relations in northwestern Central Asia. Ablai Khan manoeuvred between Russia and China, allowing the Kazakh Khanate to maintain relative independence for a time. Later, Ablai and the Kazakh lords who supported him embarked on a course of military conquest, conducting plundering raids against the population of the Altai, as well as into Kyrgyzstan and Central Asia. He also co-operated with the Russian authorities in pursuing the Kalmyks who had fled from the Volga, while brutally repressing ordinary members of Kazakh society who were dissatisfied with his policies. He later became the last khan whose authority was recognised throughout the Kazakh steppe. After his death, his son Wali Khan abandoned this independent policy and recognised Russian suzerainty.

In 1822, the Khanate institution among the Kazakh Hordes was abolished, sparking the uprising of Sultan Qasym in 1824–1827. The final attempt to restore the Khanate was led by Sultan Kenesary Qasymov, who proclaimed himself khan in 1837 and conducted an armed struggle against Russian authorities until his death in 1847. Assessments of Kenesary Khan have varied with changing political circumstances. In Soviet, Russian, and Kazakh historiography between 1917 and 1953, he was portrayed variously as a hero of the national liberation and anti-colonial struggle or as a "reactionary". His activities and legacy remain complex and contested. Kenesary's campaigns also inspired Jules Verne's novel Michael Strogoff (1876).

=== Russian Kazakhstan ===
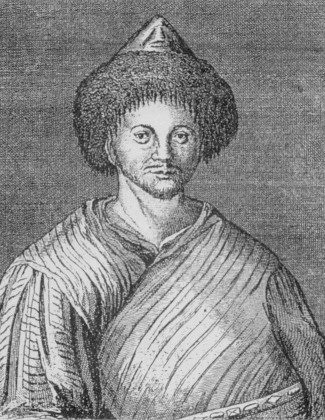
Portrait of Abulkhair Khan by John Castle

Abulkhair Khan's letter to Empress Anna Ioannovna, 1731

In the first half of the 18th century the Russian Empire constructed the Irtysh line, a series of forty-six forts and ninety-six redoubts, including Omsk (1716), Semipalatinsk (1718), Pavlodar (1720), Orenburg (1743) and Petropavlovsk (1752), to prevent Kazakh and Oirat raids into Russian territory. In the late 18th century the Kazakhs took advantage of Pugachev's Rebellion, which was centred on the Volga area, to raid Russian and Volga German settlements. In the 19th century, the Russian Empire began to expand its influence into Central Asia. The "Great Game" period is generally regarded as running from approximately 1813 to the Anglo-Russian Convention of 1907. The tsars effectively ruled over most of the territory belonging to what became the Republic of Kazakhstan.

In the words of A. I. Maksheev, "during the whole of the eighteenth and the beginning of the nineteenth century, the Kazakhs were Russian subjects in name only. In reality, they preserved their independence. The Russians had to separate themselves from them with fortresses and troops and did not even dare to cross the Line." However, this began to change in the 1820s.

Beginning in the late 19th century, the Kazakh national movement sought to preserve the native language and cultural identity in opposition to the Russian Empire's assimilation policies. At the same time, Russian-style education introduced modern ideas to the steppe, and figures like Shoqan Walikhanov and Abay Kunanbayev adapted these ideas to the specific needs of Kazakh society, creating a secular culture unparalleled in other parts of Asian Russia.

From the 1890s onward, ever-larger numbers of settlers from the Russian Empire began colonizing the territory of present-day Kazakhstan, in particular, the province of Semirechye. The number of settlers rose still further once the Trans-Aral Railway from Orenburg to Tashkent was completed in 1906. A specially created Migration Department (Переселенческое Управление) in St. Petersburg oversaw and encouraged the migration to expand Russian influence in the area. During the 19th century, about 400,000 Russians immigrated to Kazakhstan, and about one million Slavs, Germans, Jews, and others immigrated to the region during the first third of the 20th century. Vasile Balabanov was the administrator responsible for the resettlement during much of this time.

The competition for land and water that ensued between the Kazakhs and the newcomers caused great resentment against colonial rule during the final years of the Russian Empire. The most significant uprising, the Central Asian revolt, occurred in 1916. The Kazakhs attacked Russian and Cossack settlers and military garrisons. The revolt resulted in a series of clashes and in brutal massacres committed by both sides. Both sides resisted the communist government until late 1919.

In the wake of the Russian Revolution, the Alash Orda government was formed in 1917 as an attempt to secure Kazakh autonomy. Although it existed only in name, Alash Orda represented the Kazakh push for self-rule. The Bolshevik Red Army eventually defeated White Russian forces in the region by 1920, and Kazakhstan was incorporated into the Soviet Union.

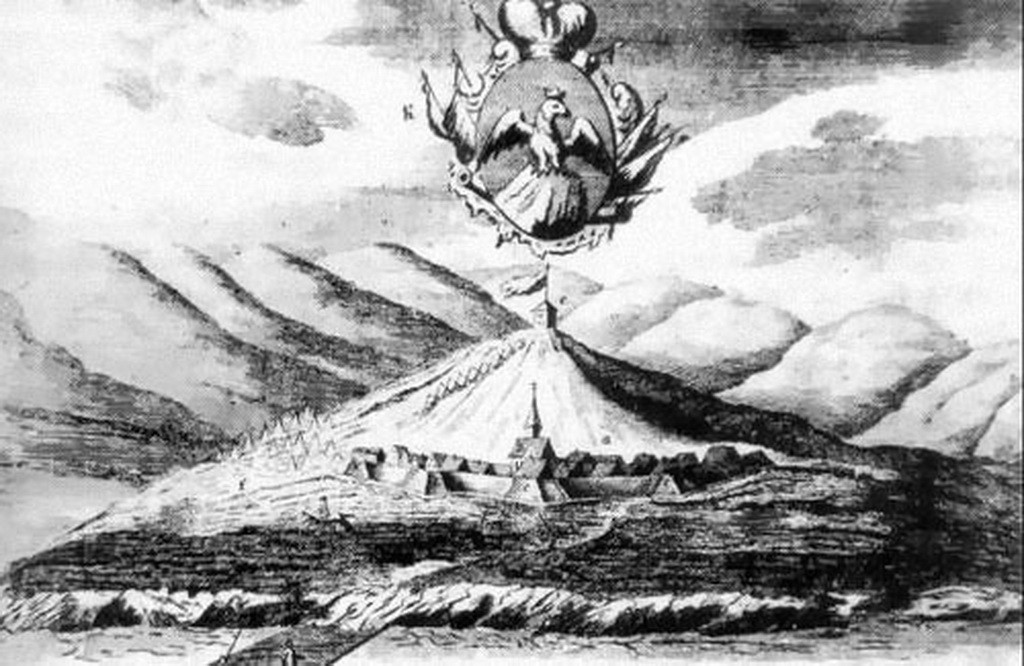
Orsk Fortress, 1736

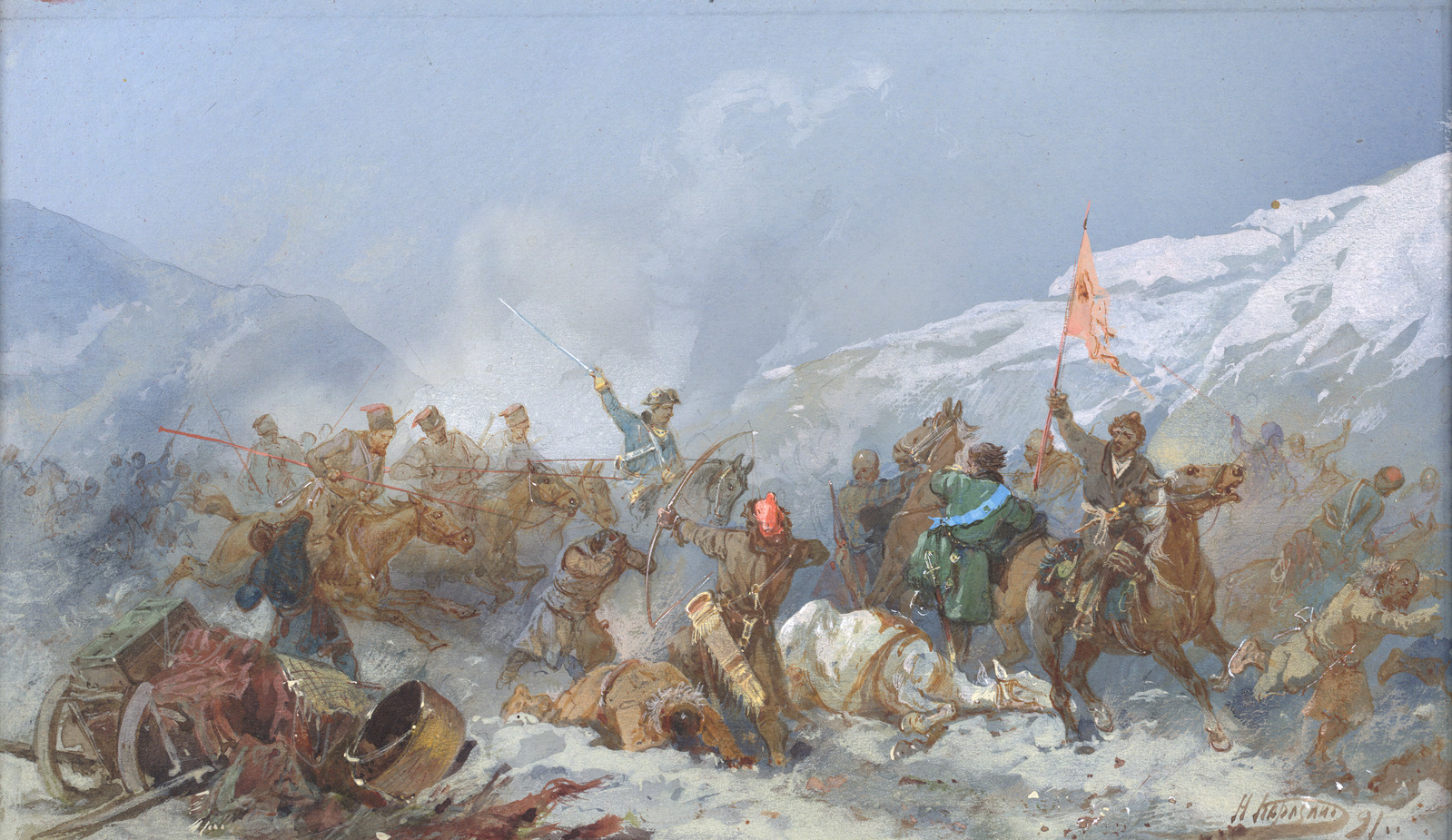
Battle with Pugachev's forces

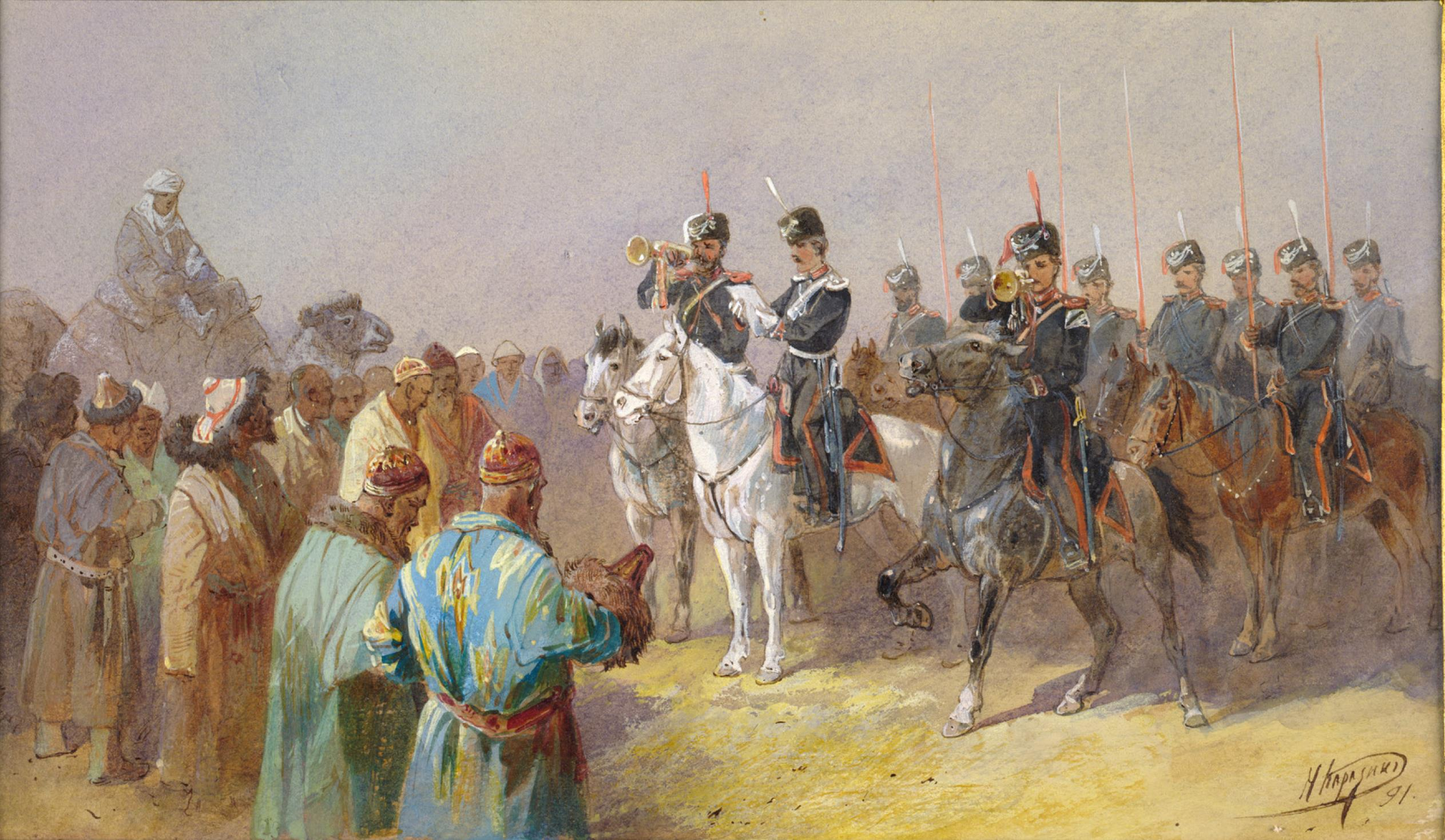
Proclamation concerning the Middle Horde, imperial decree, 1824

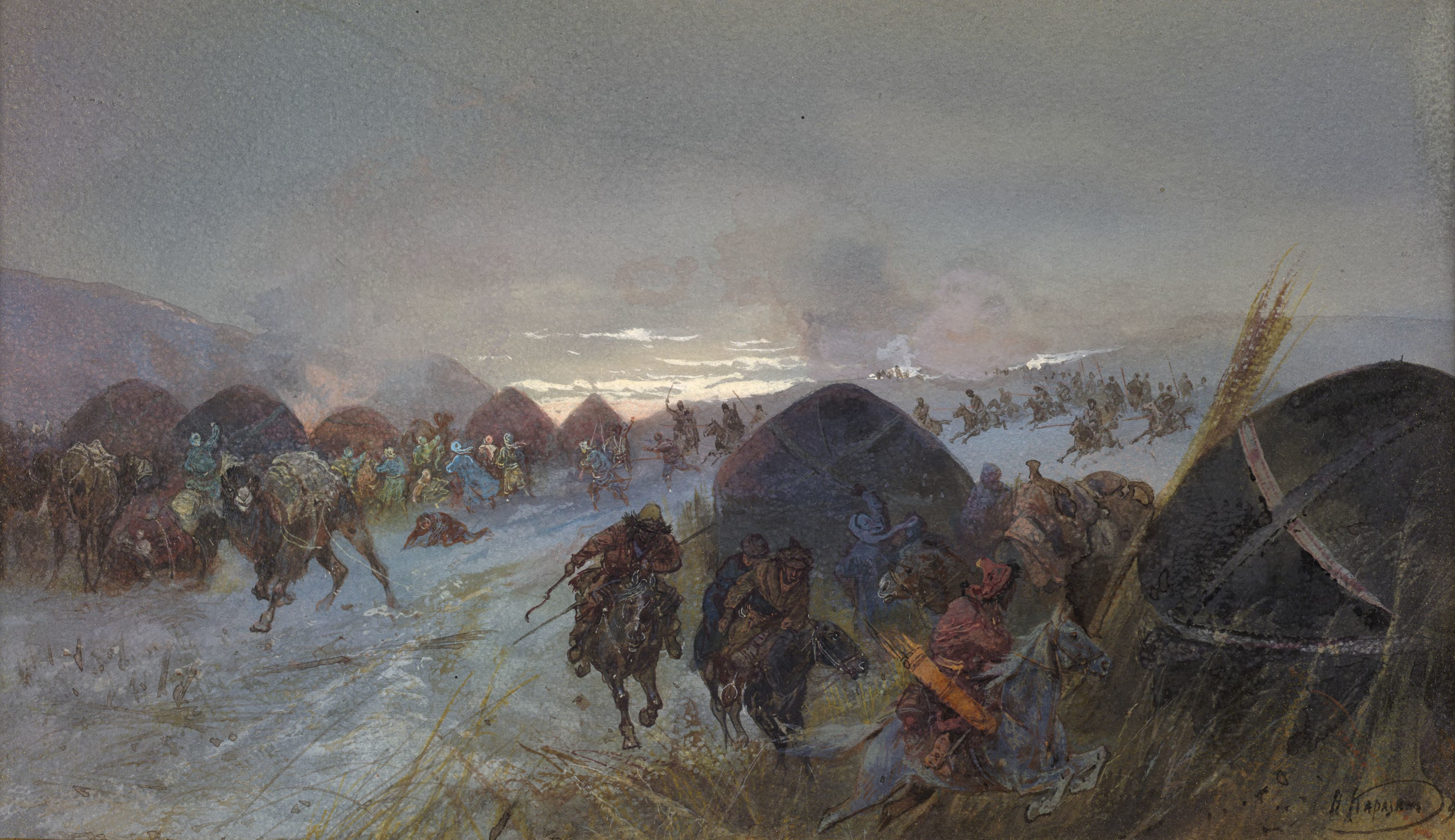
Cossack raid on a native settlement

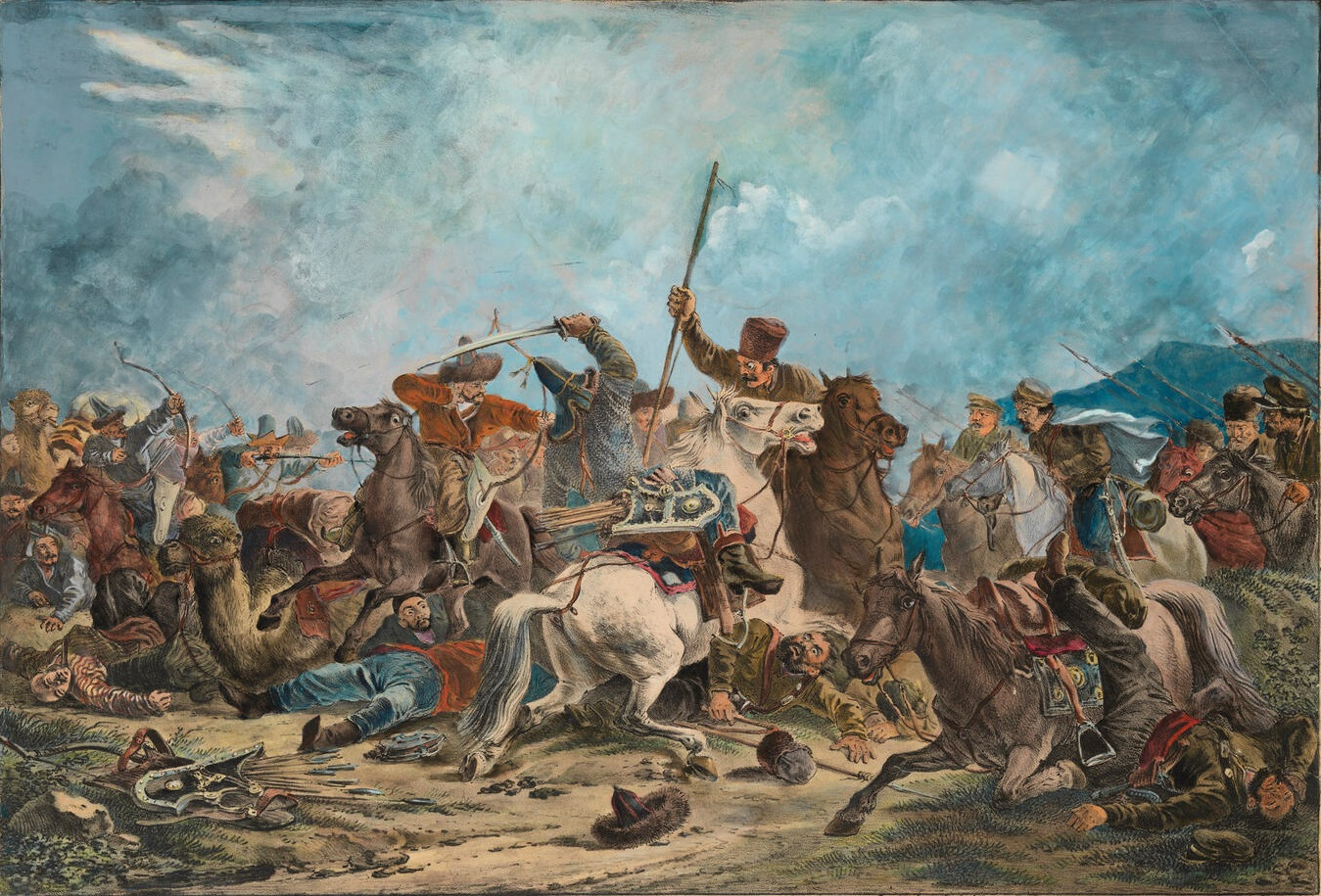
Ural Cossacks skirmish with Kazakhs

=== Kazakh SSR ===
Following the collapse of central government in Petrograd in November 1917, the Kazakhs (then in Russia officially referred to as "Kirghiz") experienced a brief period of autonomy (the Alash Autonomy) before eventually succumbing to the Bolsheviks' rule. On 26 August 1920 the Kirghiz Autonomous Socialist Soviet Republic within the Russian Soviet Federative Socialist Republic (RSFSR) was established. The Kirghiz ASSR included the territory of present-day Kazakhstan, but its administrative centre was the mainly Russian-populated town of Orenburg. In June 1925, the Kirghiz ASSR was renamed the Kazak ASSR and its administrative centre was transferred to the town of Kyzylorda, and in April 1927 to Alma-Ata.

Despite their traditionally nomadic lifestyle, the Kazakhs had one of the highest literacy rates for Central Asia. However, Soviet forced collectivization and repression of the traditional elite in the late 1920s and 1930s caused catastrophic demographic loss. Between 1926 and 1939, an estimated 1.5 million Kazakhs died from starvation, disease and violence, primarily during the Kazakh famine of 1930–1933. Thousands fled to China, but many did not survive the journey. During the 1930s, some members of the Kazakh intelligentsia were executed – as part of the policies of political reprisals pursued by the Soviet government in Moscow.

On 5 December 1936 the Kazakh Autonomous Soviet Socialist Republic (whose territory by then corresponded to that of modern Kazakhstan) was detached from the Russian Soviet Federative Socialist Republic (RSFSR) and made the Kazakh Soviet Socialist Republic, a full union republic of the USSR, one of eleven such republics at the time, along with the Kirghiz Soviet Socialist Republic.

The republic was one of the destinations for exiled and convicted persons, as well as for mass resettlements, or deportations affected by the central USSR authorities during the 1930s and 1940s, such as approximately 400,000 Volga Germans deported from the Volga German Autonomous Soviet Socialist Republic in September–October 1941, and then later the Greeks and Crimean Tatars. Deportees and prisoners were interned in some of the biggest Soviet labour camps (the Gulag), including ALZhIR camp outside Astana, which was reserved for the wives of men considered "enemies of the people". Many moved due to the policy of population transfer in the Soviet Union and others were forced into involuntary settlements in the Soviet Union.

The Soviet-German War (1941–1945) led to an increase in industrialization and mineral extraction in support of the war effort. At the time of Joseph Stalin's death in 1953, however, Kazakhstan still had an overwhelmingly agricultural economy. In 1953, Soviet leader Nikita Khrushchev initiated the Virgin Lands Campaign designed to turn the traditional pasturelands of Kazakhstan into a major grain-producing region for the Soviet Union. The Virgin Lands policy brought mixed results. However, along with later modernizations under Soviet leader Leonid Brezhnev (in power 1964–1982), it accelerated the development of the agricultural sector, which remains the source of livelihood for a large percentage of Kazakhstan's population. Because of the decades of privation, war and resettlement, by 1959 the Kazakhs had become a minority, making up 30% of the population. Ethnic Russians accounted for 43%.

In 1947, the USSR, as part of its atomic bomb project, founded an atomic bomb test site near the north-eastern town of Semipalatinsk, where the first Soviet nuclear bomb test was conducted in 1949. Hundreds of nuclear tests were conducted until 1989 with adverse consequences for the nation's environment and population. The Anti-nuclear movement in Kazakhstan became a major political force in the late 1980s.

In April 1961, Baikonur became the springboard of Vostok 1, a spacecraft with Soviet cosmonaut Yuri Gagarin being the first human to enter space.

In December 1986, mass demonstrations by young ethnic Kazakhs, later called the Jeltoqsan riot, took place in Almaty to protest the replacement of the First Secretary of the Communist Party of the Kazakh SSR Dinmukhamed Konayev with Gennady Kolbin from the Russian SFSR. Governmental troops suppressed the unrest, several people were killed, and many demonstrators were jailed. In the waning days of Soviet rule, discontent continued to grow and found expression under Soviet leader Mikhail Gorbachev's policy of glasnost ("openness").

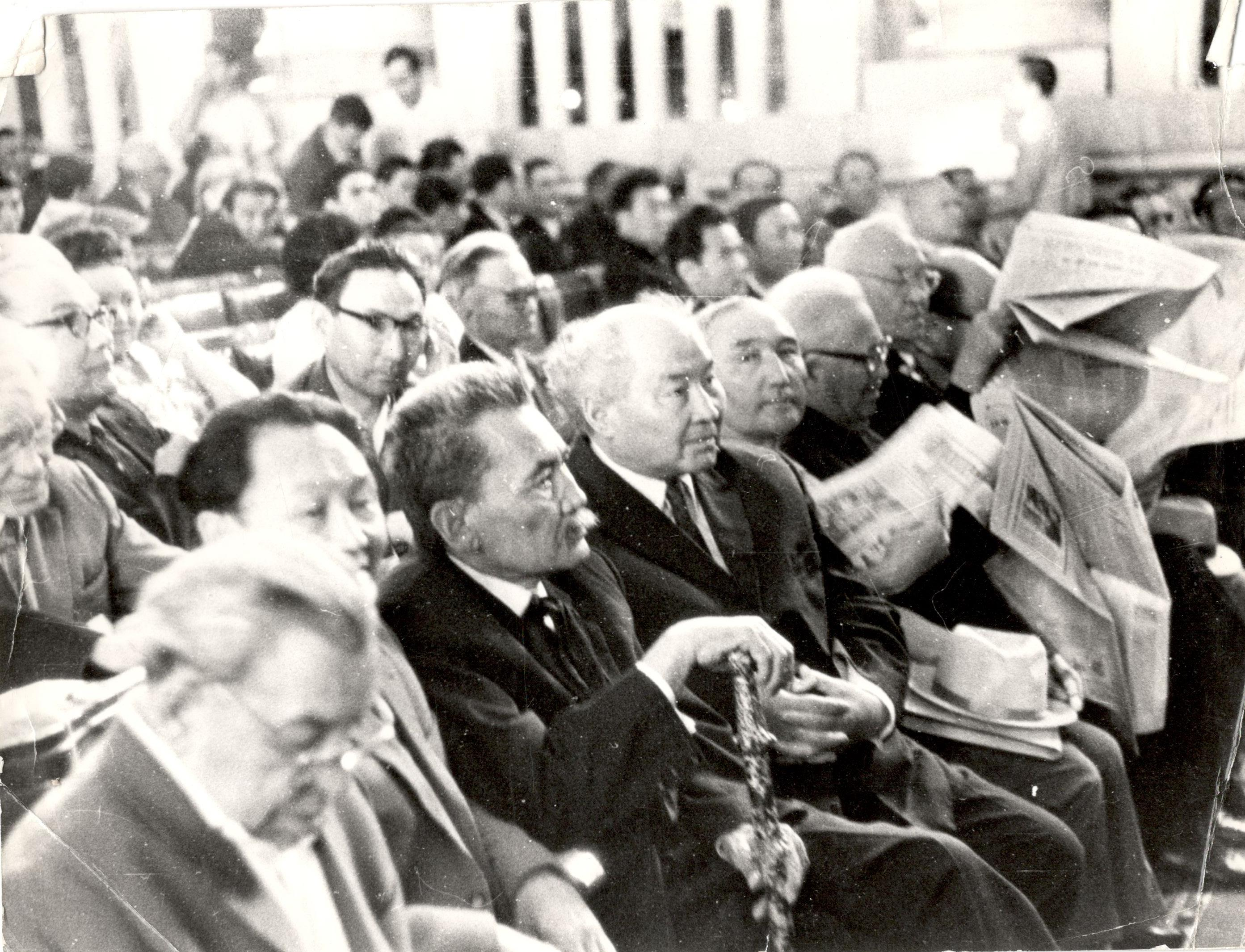
Bauyrzhan Momyshuly (holding a cane) next to Alkey Margulan and Mekemtas Myrzakhmetuly (on the right side, next to Momyshuly) at the Congress of the Writers' Union of Kazakhstan

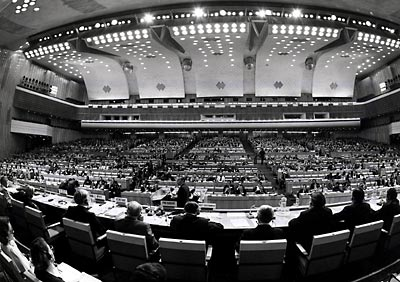
The International Conference on Primary Health Care in 1978, known as the Alma-Ata Declaration

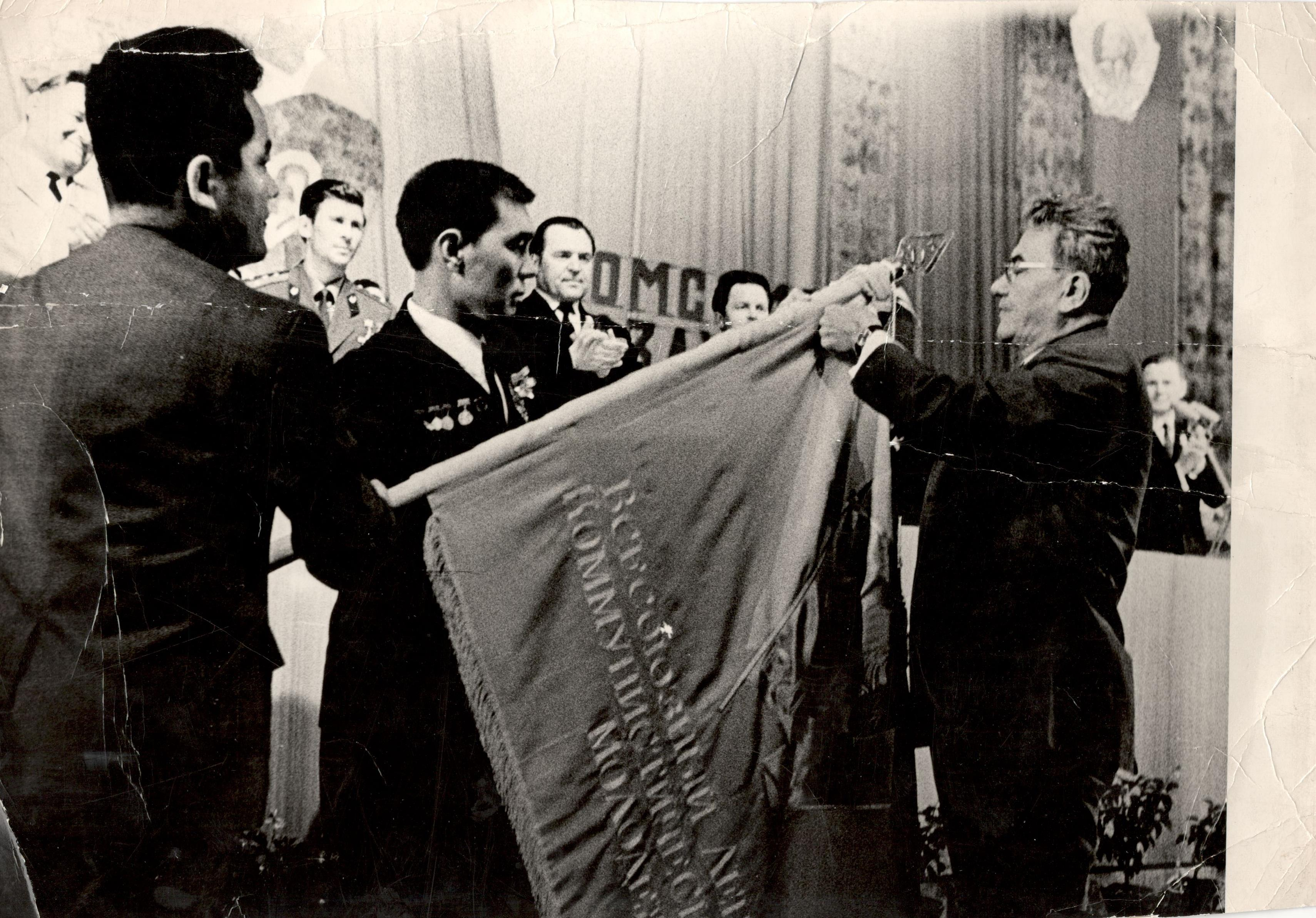
Soviet Kazakhstan leader Dinmukhamed Kunayev with a Komsomol flag

=== Independence ===
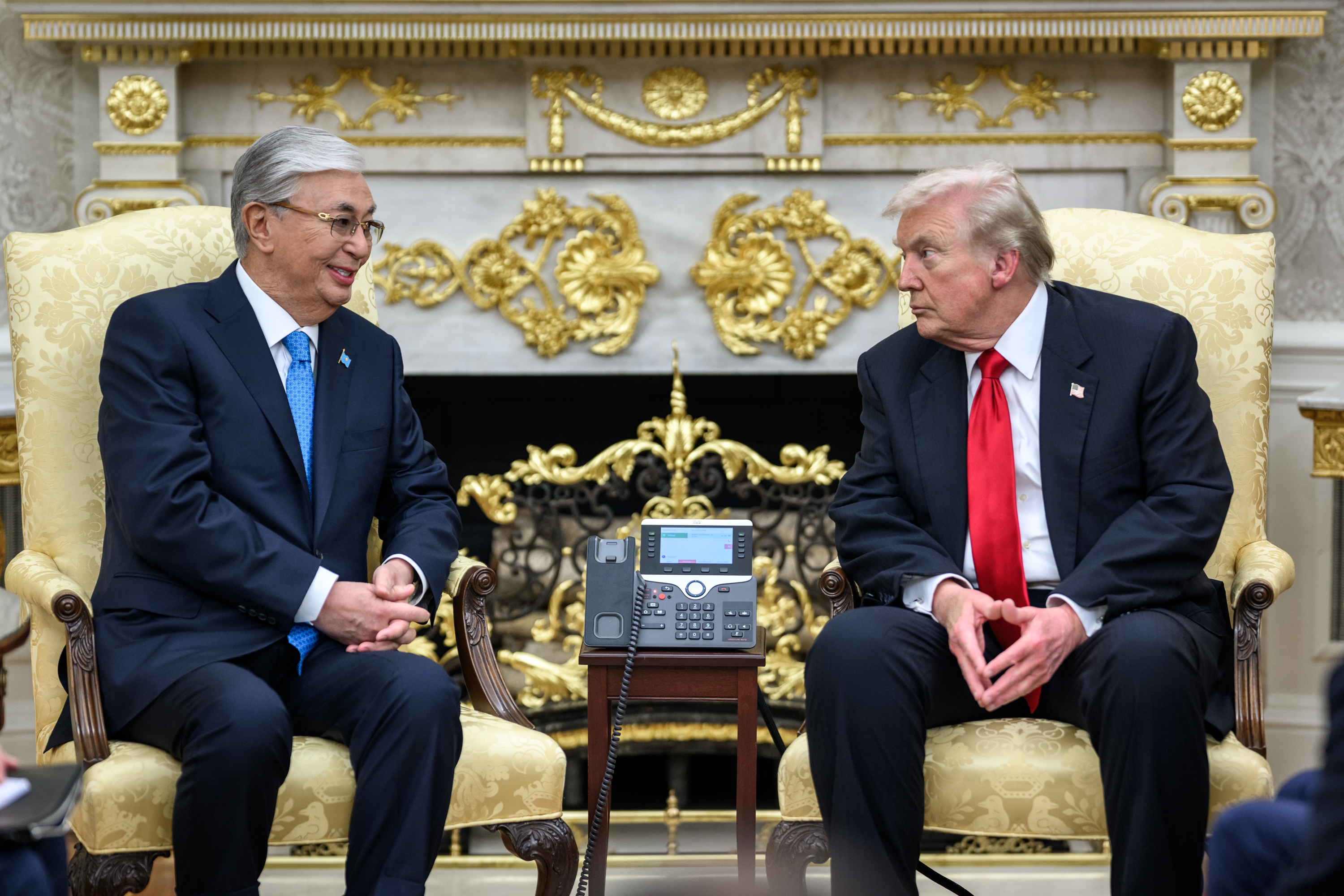
Donald Trump meets with Kassym-Jomart Tokayev in the Oval Office in 2025.

Kazakhstan declared its sovereignty within the Soviet Union on 25 October 1990. Following the failed August 1991 coup attempt in Moscow, the country proclaimed full independence on 16 December 1991, becoming the last Soviet republic to do so. Ten days after Kazakhstan's declaration, the Soviet Union itself dissolved. This period marked a significant turning point in Kazakhstan's history, as it embarked on a new political and economic path separate from Moscow's control.

Nursultan Nazarbayev, the communist-era leader of Kazakhstan, became the country's first president. Under his leadership, Kazakhstan transitioned from a Soviet-era planned economy to a market economy, focusing on privatization and foreign investments. The emphasis on economic reform, particularly in the oil sector, helped Kazakhstan become one of Central Asia's most economically powerful nations. By 2006, Kazakhstan contributed around 60% of the region's GDP, primarily through its oil exports. However, political reforms lagged behind these economic strides, and Nazarbayev maintained an authoritarian rule throughout his presidency.

In 1997, Nazarbayev moved the capital from Almaty, the country's largest city, to Astana (later renamed Nur-Sultan in 2019), a decision that symbolized the government's desire to modernize and assert control over the country's vast territories. The capital city change was part of broader efforts to establish a new national identity and shift the political center from former Soviet-era heartlands.

Kazakhstan's political landscape during Nazarbayev's rule was characterized by limited political pluralism. In the 2004 parliamentary elections, the pro-government Otan Party, led by Nazarbayev, dominated the Majilis (the lower house of parliament). Other parties sympathetic to the president, such as the agrarian-industrial bloc AIST and the Asar party (founded by Nazarbayev's daughter), secured most of the remaining seats, while opposition parties struggled to gain representation. International observers, including the Organization for Security and Cooperation in Europe, criticized the elections for not meeting democratic standards.

Despite claims of progress toward democracy, Kazakhstan's political system remained authoritarian well into the 21st century. In 2010, the country was still ranked as an authoritarian regime on The Economist's Democracy Index. Nazarbayev, who had ruled since independence, announced his resignation on 19 March 2019, after nearly three decades in power. His successor, Kassym-Jomart Tokayev, won the 2019 presidential election and took office on 12 June 2019. Tokayev's first official act was to rename the capital city to Nur-Sultan, in honour of Nazarbayev's legacy.

But Tokayev's presidency faced significant challenges. In January 2022, Kazakhstan was gripped by large-scale protests following a sharp rise in fuel prices. The unrest quickly escalated, and Tokayev responded decisively by assuming control of the country's Security Council, removing Nazarbayev from the post and consolidating his own power. This marked a dramatic shift in Kazakhstan's political dynamics, with Tokayev signalling a departure from the old Nazarbayev-era system. In September 2022, the capital's name was reverted to Astana, a move seen as part of the broader efforts to distance the country from the former president's influence.

== Geography ==
Since it extends across both sides of the Ural River, considered the dividing line separating Europe and Asia, Kazakhstan is one of only two landlocked countries in the world that has territory in two continents (the other is Azerbaijan).

With an area of 2,700,000 square kilometres (1,000,000 sq mi)—equivalent in size to Western Europe—Kazakhstan is the ninth-largest country and largest landlocked country in the world. While it was part of the Russian Empire, Kazakhstan lost some of its territory to China's Xinjiang province, and some to Uzbekistan's Karakalpakstan autonomous republic during Soviet years.

It shares borders of 6,846 kilometres (4,254 mi) with Russia (the world's longest land border), 2,203 kilometres (1,369 mi) with Uzbekistan, 1,533 kilometres (953 mi) with China, 1,051 kilometres (653 mi) with Kyrgyzstan, and 379 kilometres (235 mi) with Turkmenistan. Major cities include Almaty, Astana, Shymkent, Aktöbe and Karagandy. It lies between latitudes 40° and 56° N, and longitudes 46° and 88° E. While located primarily in Asia, a small portion of Kazakhstan is also located west of the Urals in Eastern Europe.

Kazakhstan's terrain extends west to east from the Caspian Sea to the Altai Mountains and the Tian Shan, and north to south from the plains of Western Siberia to the oases and deserts of Central Asia. The Kazakh Steppe (plain), with an area of around 804,500 square kilometres (310,600 sq mi), occupies one-third of the country and is the world's largest dry steppe region. The steppe is characterized by large areas of grasslands and sandy regions. Major seas, lakes and rivers include Lake Balkhash, Lake Zaysan, the Charyn River and gorge, the Ili, Irtysh, Ishim, Ural and Syr Darya rivers, and the Aral Sea until it largely dried up in one of the world's worst environmental disasters.

The Charyn Canyon is 80 kilometres (50 mi) long, cutting through a red sandstone plateau and stretching along the Charyn River gorge in northern Tian Shan ("Heavenly Mountains", 200 km (124 mi) east of Almaty) at 43°21′1.16″N 79°4′49.28″E. The steep canyon slopes, columns and arches rise to heights of between 150 and 300 metres (490 and 980 feet). The inaccessibility of the canyon provided a safe haven for a rare ash tree, Fraxinus sogdiana, which survived the Ice Age there and has now also grown in some other areas. Bigach crater, at 48°30′N 82°00′E, is a Pliocene or Miocene asteroid impact crater, 8 km (5 mi) in diameter and estimated to be 5±3 million years old.

Kazakhstan's Almaty region is also home to the Mynzhylky mountain plateau.

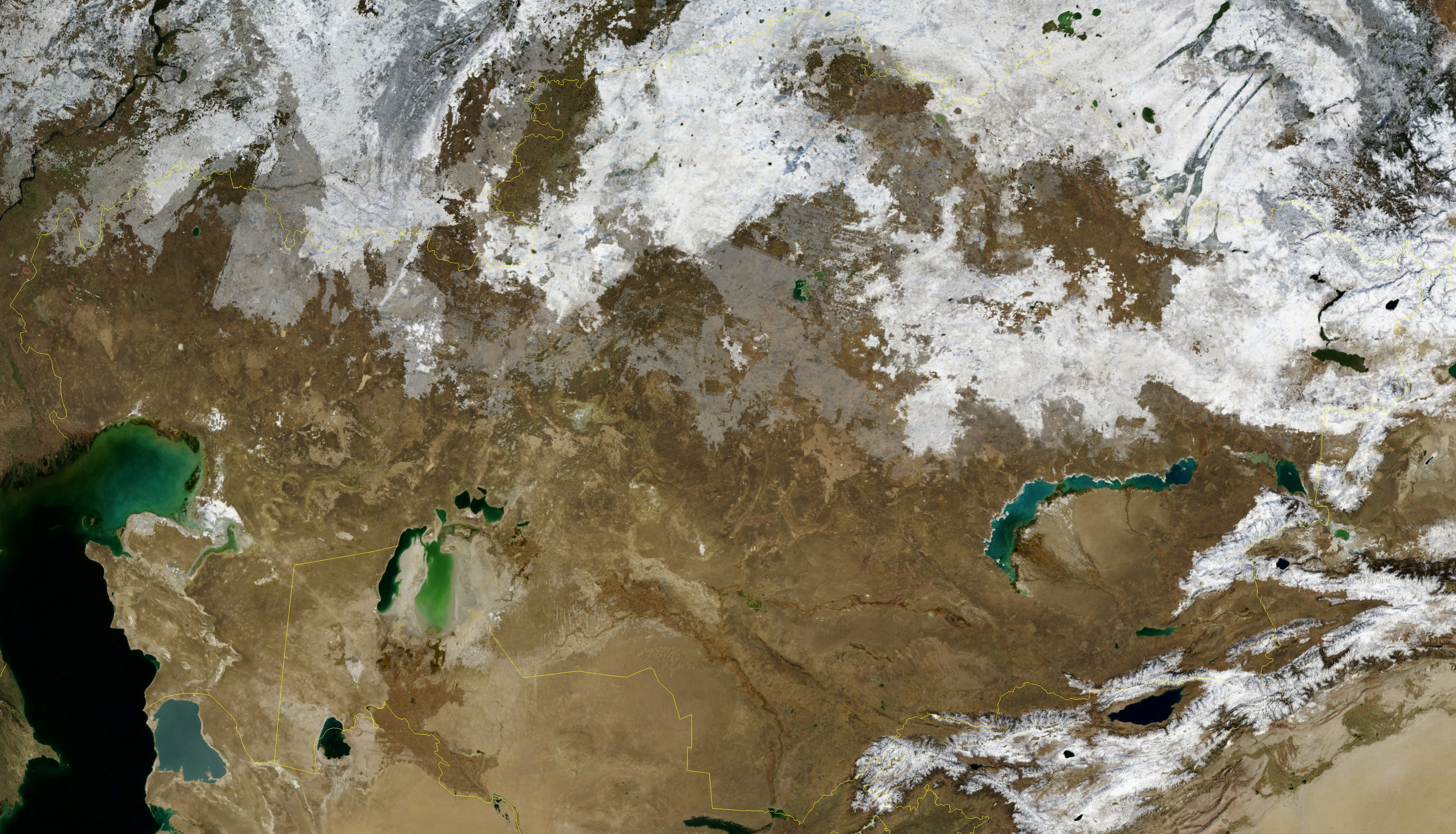
Satellite image of Kazakhstan (November 2004)

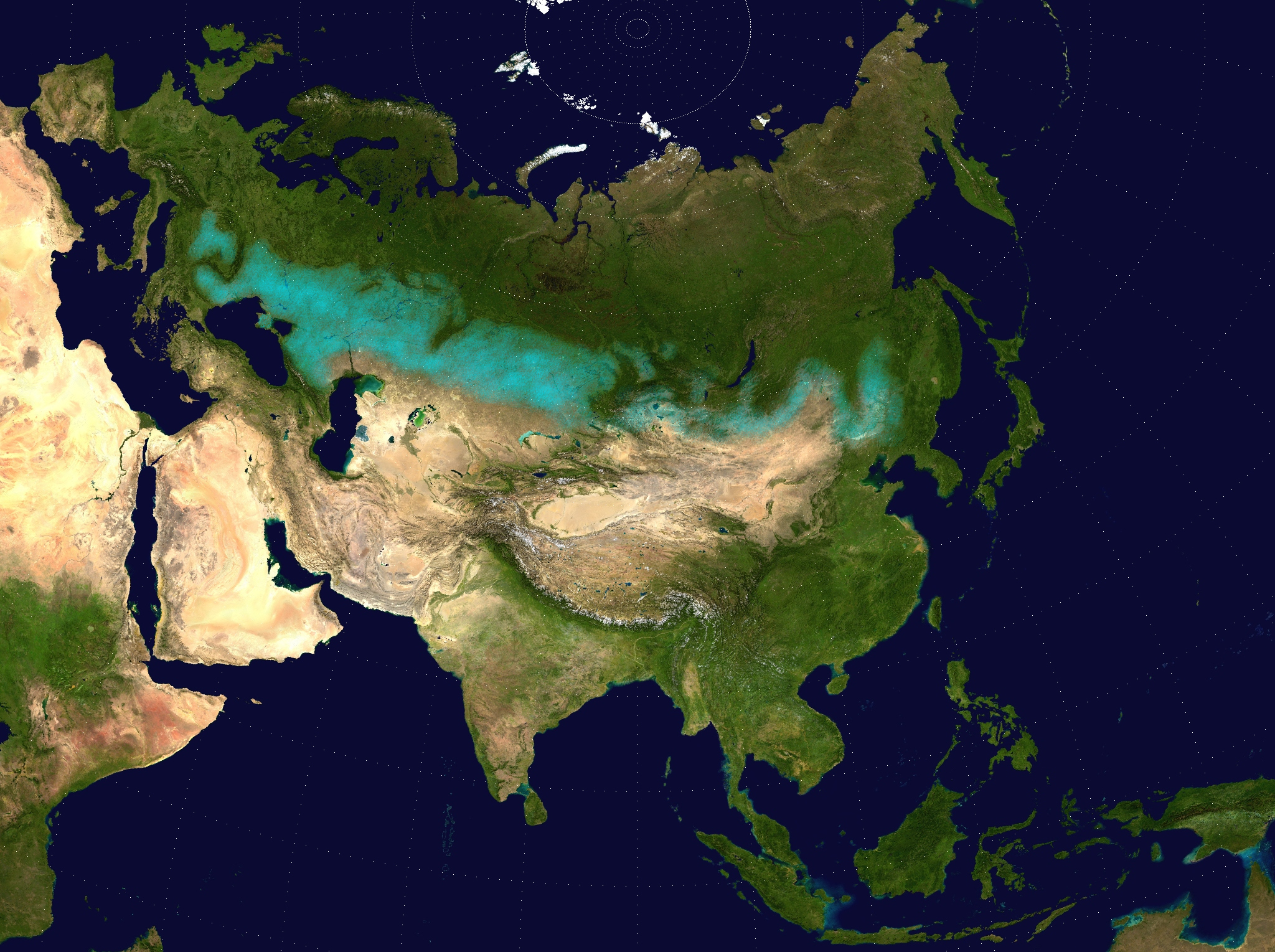
The Kazakh Steppe is part of the Eurasian Steppe Belt (in on the map).

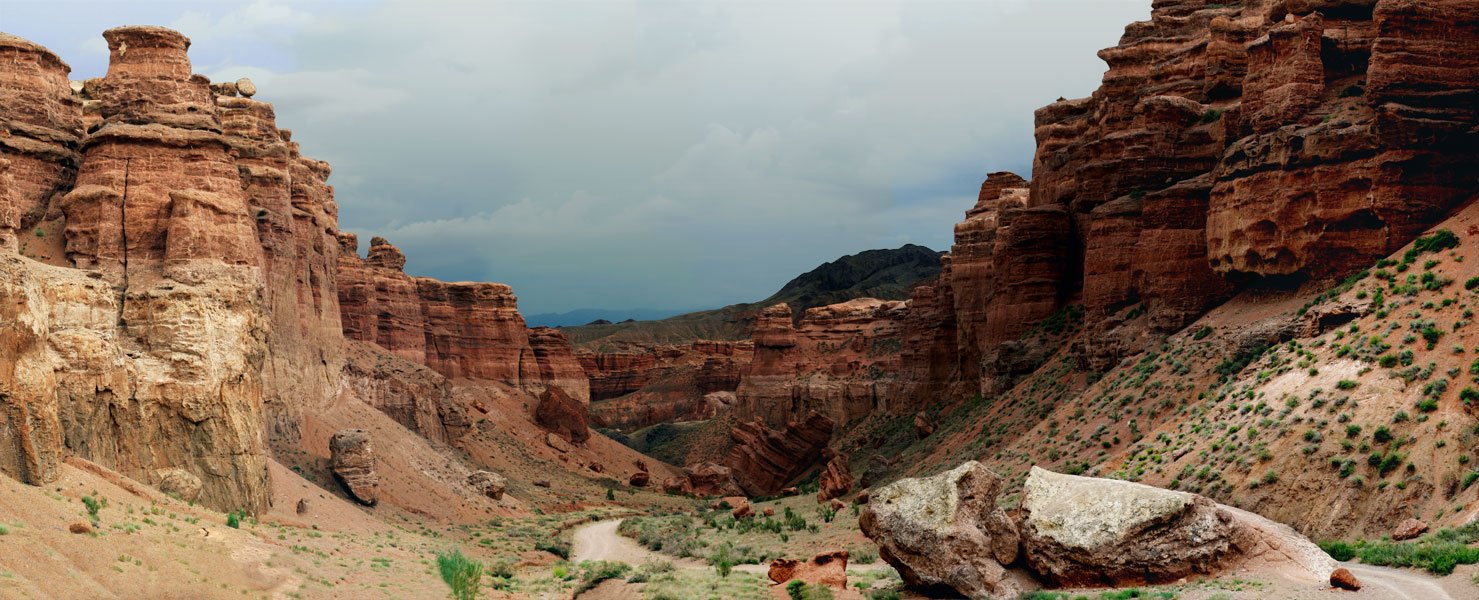
Charyn Canyon

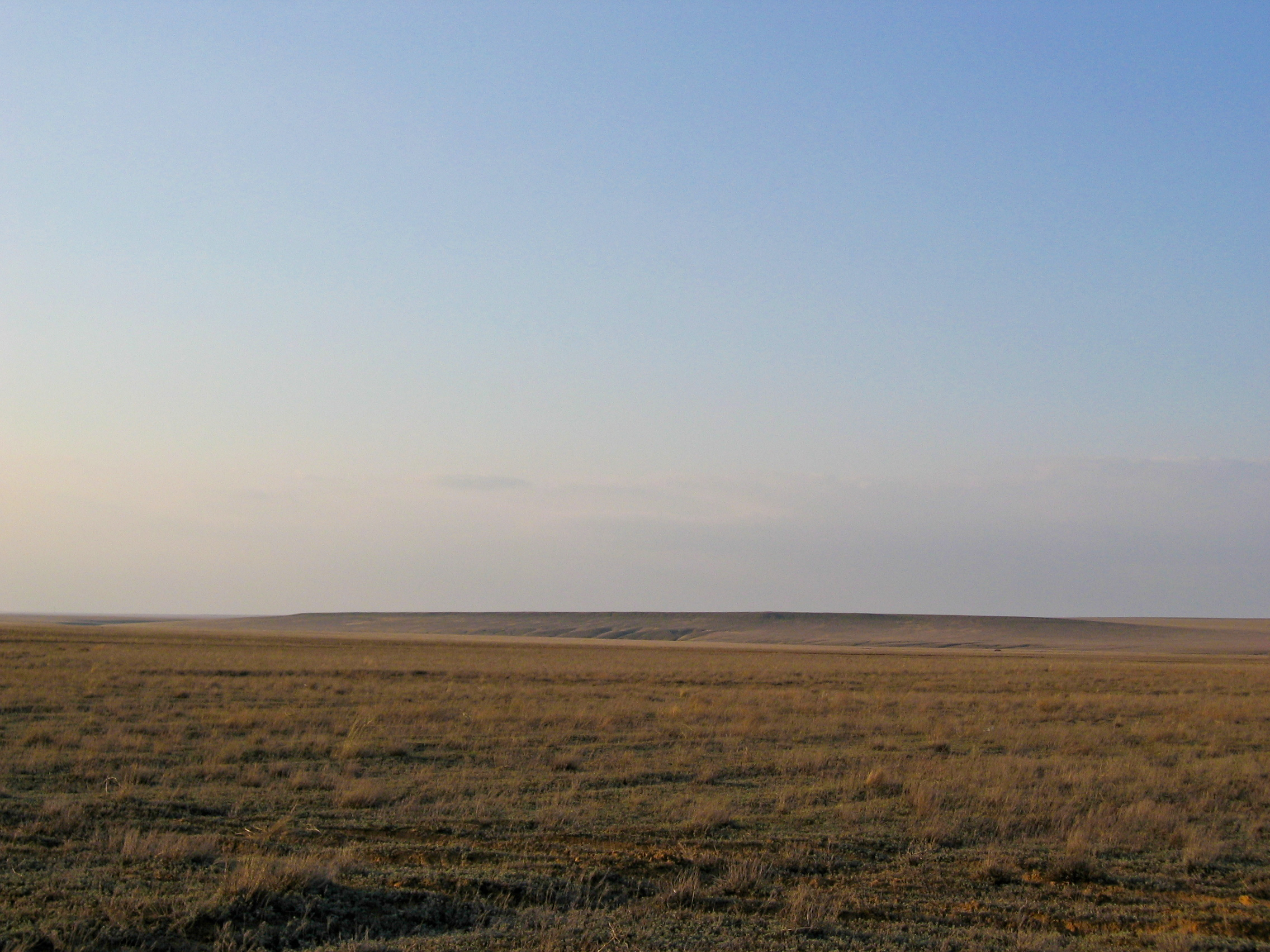
The Kazakh Steppe in the early spring

=== Natural resources ===
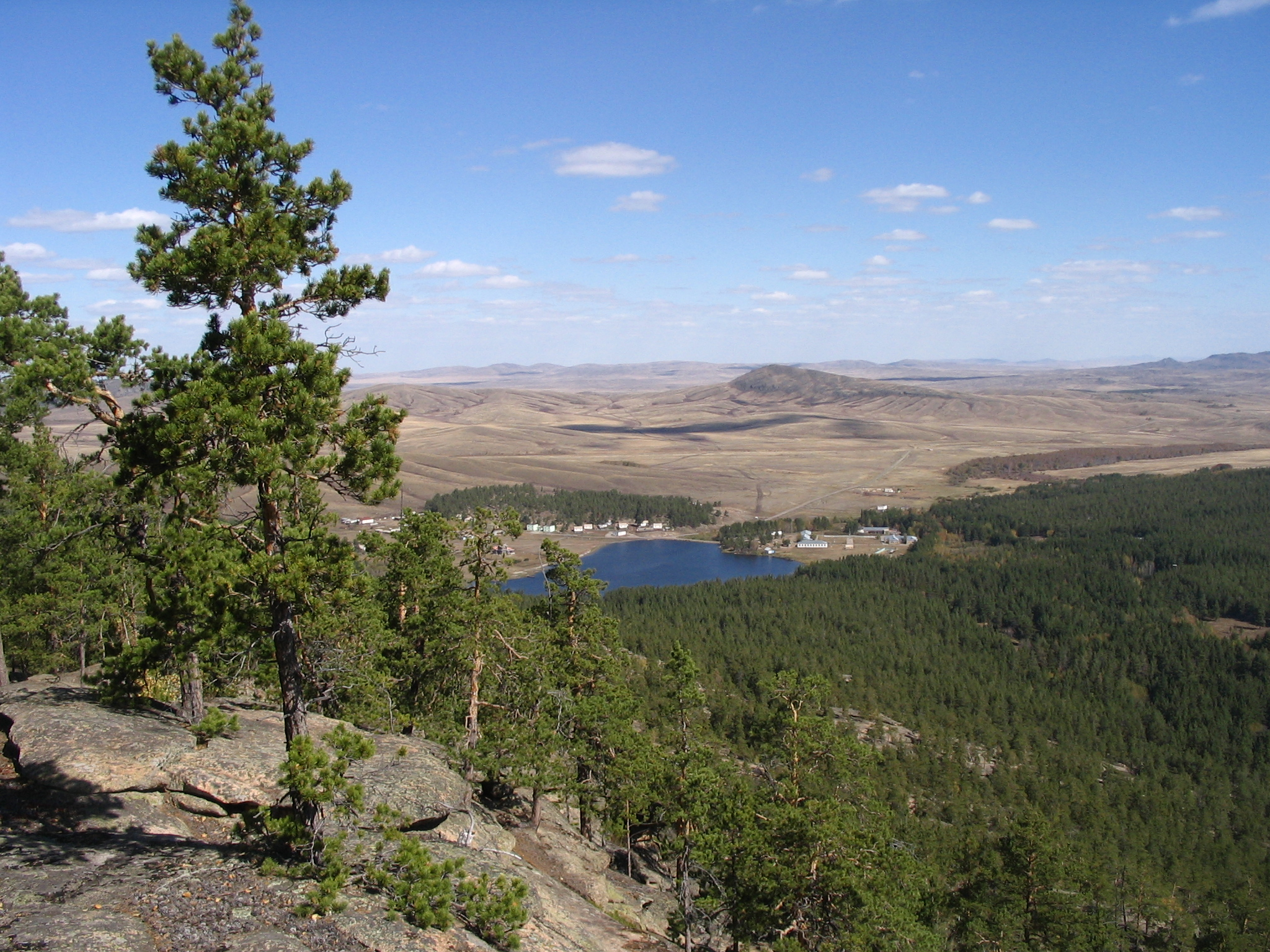
Qarağandy Region

Kazakhstan has an abundant supply of accessible mineral and fossil fuel resources. Development of petroleum, natural gas, and mineral extractions has attracted most of the over $40 billion in foreign investment in Kazakhstan since 1993 and accounts for some 57% of the nation's industrial output (or approximately 13% of gross domestic product). According to some estimates, Kazakhstan has the second largest uranium, chromium, lead, and zinc reserves; the third largest manganese reserves; the fifth largest copper reserves; and ranks in the top ten for coal, iron, and gold. In 2015, Kazakhstan's gold production is 64 metric tonnes. It is also an exporter of diamonds. Perhaps most significant for economic development, Kazakhstan also has the 11th largest proven reserves of both petroleum and natural gas. One such location is the Tokarevskoye gas condensate field.

In total, there are 160 deposits with over 2.7 billion tonnes (2.7 billion long tons) of petroleum. Oil explorations have shown that the deposits on the Caspian shore are only a small part of a much larger deposit. It is said that 3.5 billion tonnes (3.4 billion long tons) of oil and 2.5 billion cubic metres (88 billion cubic feet) of gas could be found in that area. Overall the estimate of Kazakhstan's oil deposits is 6.1 billion tonnes (6.0 billion long tons). However, there are only three refineries within the country, situated in Atyrau, Pavlodar, and Şymkent. These are not capable of processing the total crude output, so much of it is exported to Russia. According to the US Energy Information Administration, Kazakhstan was producing approximately 1,540,000 barrels (245,000 m^{3}) of oil per day in 2009.

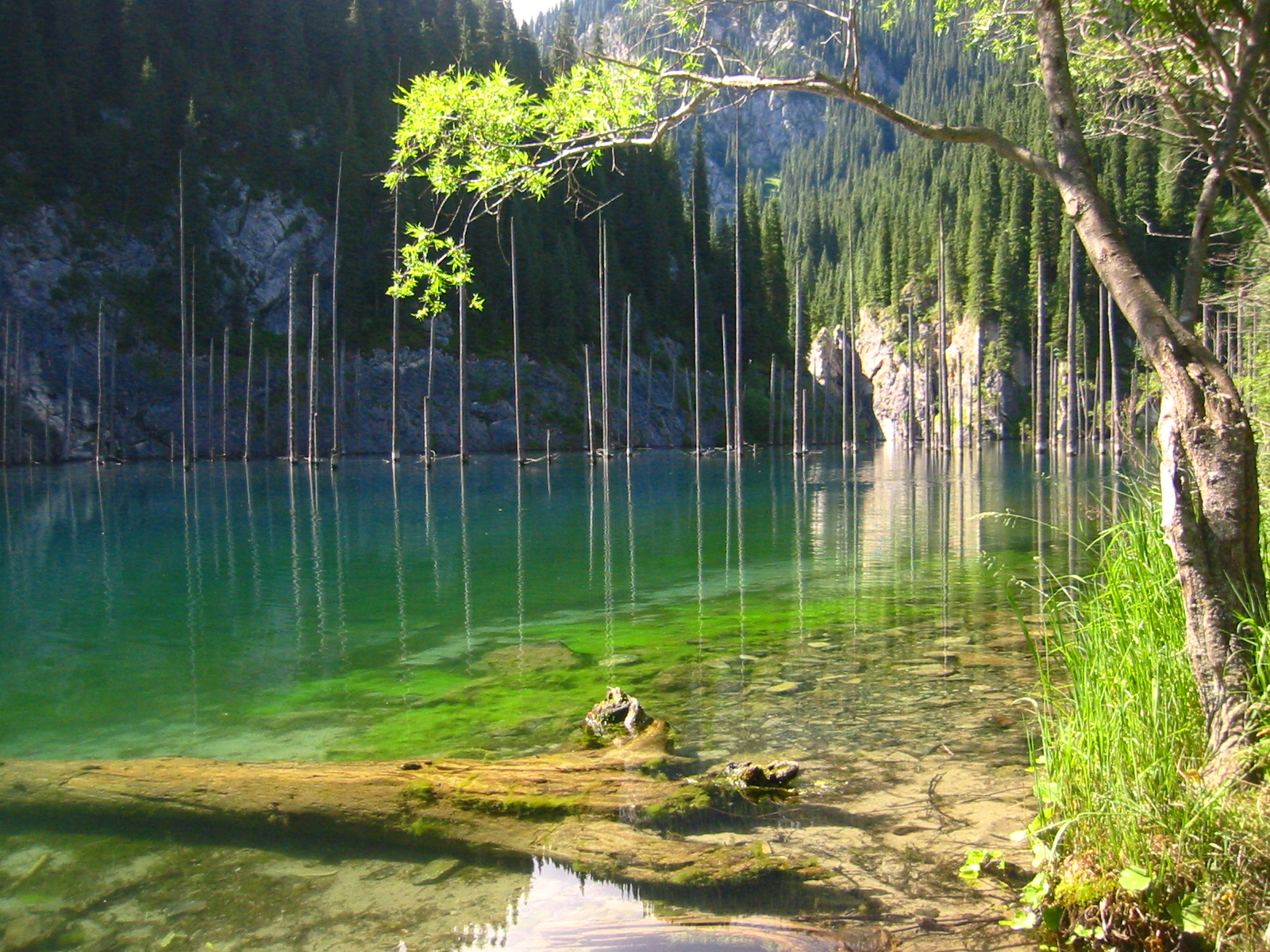
Lake Kaindy in south-eastern Kazakhstan

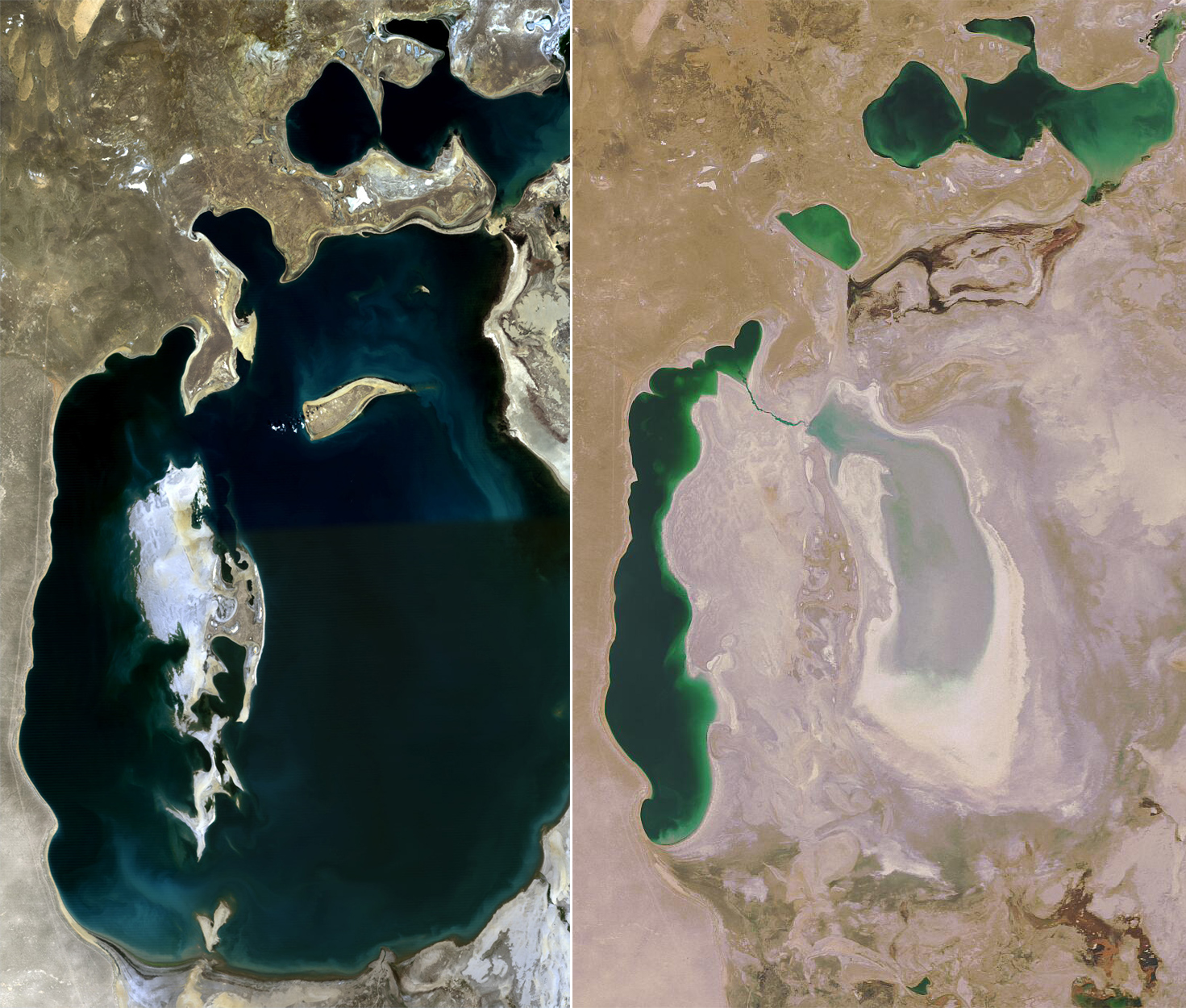
Aral Sea in 1989 and 2008

There are several large navigable rivers in Kazakhstan. All of them flow along the edges of the country, mainly in the north, while the southern and central parts of the river are mostly steppe, often drying up completely in the height of summer. Kazakhstan also possesses large deposits of phosphorite. Two of the largest deposits include the Karatau basin with 650 million tonnes of P_{2}O_{5} and the Chilisai deposit of the Aktobe phosphorite basin located in northwestern Kazakhstan, with resources of 500–800 million tonnes of 9% ore.

On 17 October 2013, the Extractive Industries Transparency Initiative (EITI) accepted Kazakhstan as "EITI Compliant", meaning that the country has a basic and functional process to ensure the regular disclosure of natural resource revenues.

=== Climate ===
Köppen–Geiger climate classification map at 1-km resolution for Kazakhstan 1991–2020

Kazakhstan has an "extreme" continental and cold steppe climate, and sits solidly inside the Eurasian Steppe, featuring the Kazakh Steppe, with hot summers and cold winters. Indeed, Astana is the second coldest capital city in the world, after Ulaanbaatar. Precipitation varies between arid and semi-arid conditions, the winter being particularly dry.

Average daily maximum and minimum temperatures for large cities in Kazakhstan
Location	July (°C)	July (°F)	January (°C)	January (°F)
Almaty	30/18	86/64	0/−8	33/17
Şymkent	32/17	91/66	4/−4	39/23
Qarağandy	27/14	80/57	−8/−17	16/1
Astana	27/15	80/59	−10/−18	14/−1
Pavlodar	28/15	82/59	−11/−20	12/−5
Aqtobe	30/15	86/61	−8/−16	17/2

=== Wildlife ===
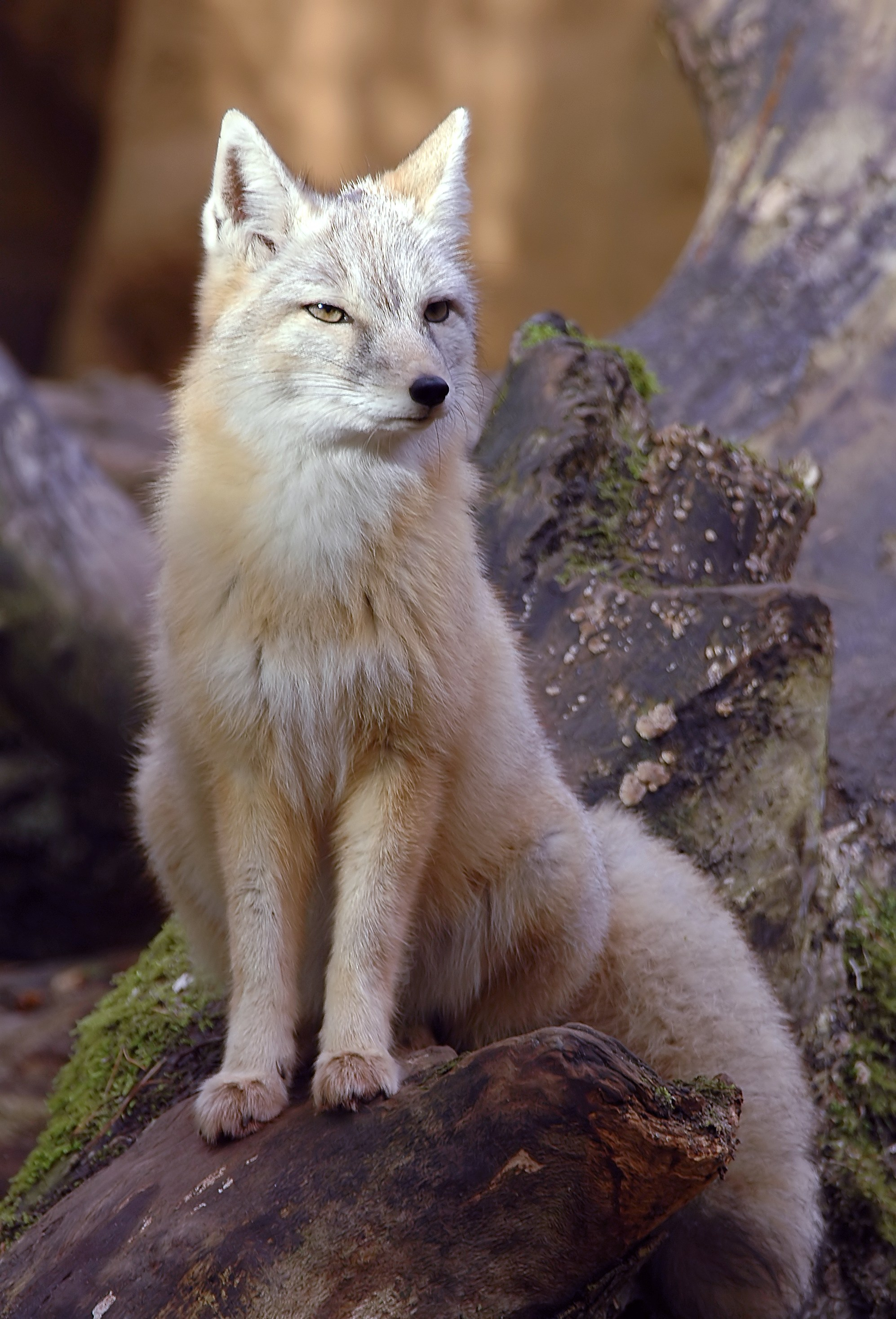
Corsac fox

There are ten nature reserves and ten national parks in Kazakhstan that provide safe haven for many rare and endangered plants and animals. In total there are twenty five areas of conservancy. Common plants are Astragalus, Gagea, Allium, Carex and Oxytropis; endangered plant species include native wild apple (Malus sieversii), wild grape (Vitis vinifera) and several wild tulip species (e.g., Tulipa greigii) and rare onion species Allium karataviense, also Iris willmottiana and Tulipa kaufmanniana. Kazakhstan had a 2019 Forest Landscape Integrity Index mean score of 8.23/10, ranking it 26th globally out of 172 countries.

Common mammals include the wolf, red fox, corsac fox, moose, argali (the largest species of sheep), Eurasian lynx, Pallas's cat, and snow leopards, several of which are protected. Kazakhstan's Red Book of Protected Species lists 125 vertebrates including many birds and mammals, and 404 plants including fungi, algae and lichens.

On 31 July 2026, a female Amur tiger was released into Ile-Balkhash State Nature Reserve, and three other individuals are still under observational review for later release. This marked the return of the species to the country for the first time since 1948.

Przewalski's horse has been reintroduced to the steppes after nearly 200 years.

== Government and politics ==
Kassym-Jomart Tokayev
President

Erlan Karin
Vice President

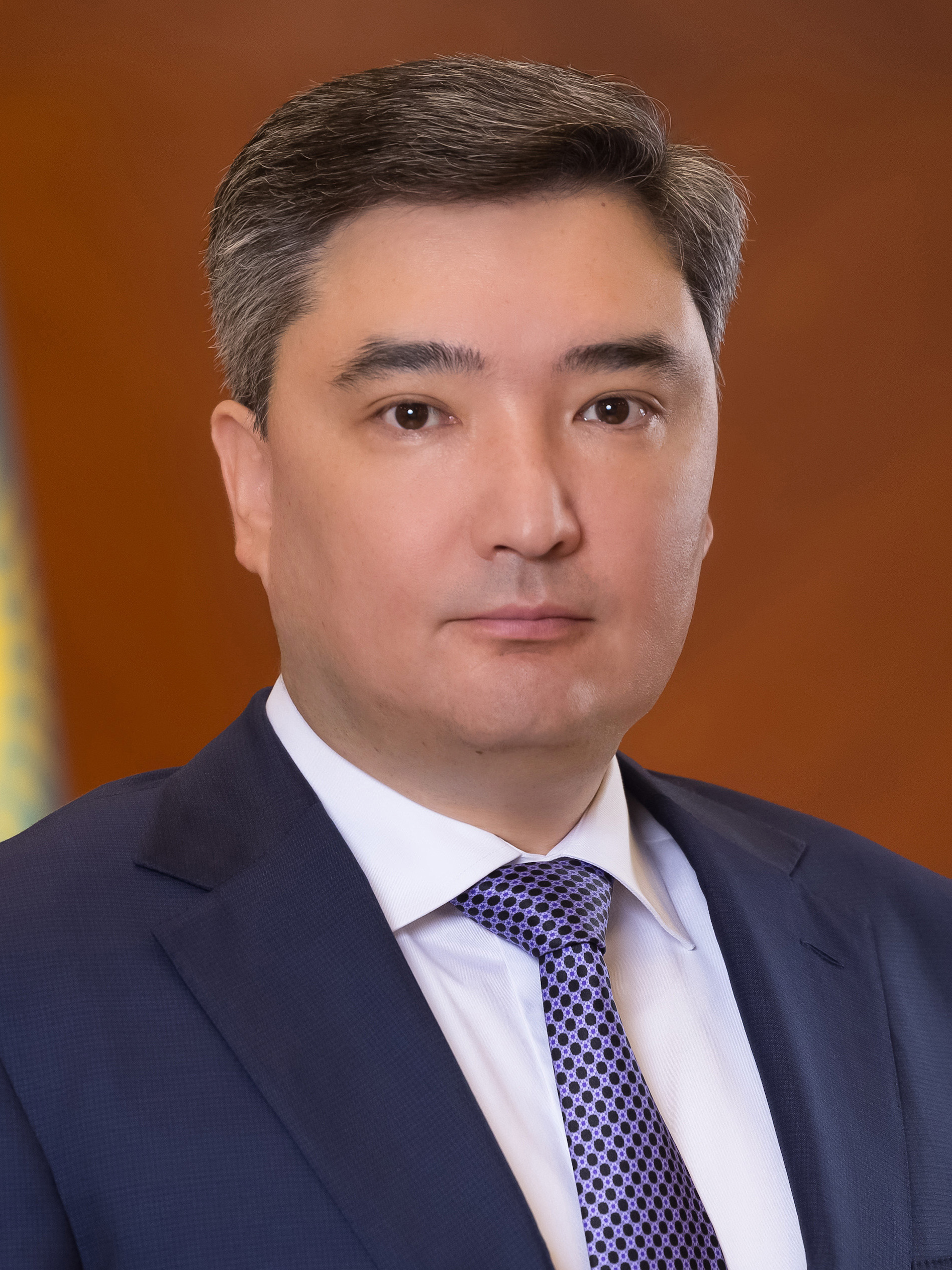
Oljas Bektenov
Prime Minister

=== Political system ===
Officially, Kazakhstan is a democratic, secular, constitutional unitary republic; Nursultan Nazarbayev led the country from 1991 to 2019. He was succeeded by Kassym-Jomart Tokayev. The president may veto legislation that has been passed by the parliament and is also the commander-in-chief of the armed forces. The prime minister chairs the cabinet of ministers and serves as Kazakhstan's head of government. There are three deputy prime ministers and sixteen ministers in the cabinet.

Kazakhstan has a unicameral parliament known as the Kurultai. The Kurultai has 145 members. In 2020, Freedom House rated Kazakhstan as a "consolidated authoritarian regime", stating that freedom of speech in Kazakhstan is not respected and "Kazakhstan's electoral laws do not provide for free and fair elections." The Economist Intelligence Unit has consistently ranked Kazakhstan as an "authoritarian regime" in its Democracy Index, ranking it 128th out of 167 countries for 2020. The V-Dem Democracy Indices described Kazakhstan an electoral autocracy in 2024.

=== Political reforms ===
Reforms have begun to be implemented after the election of Kassym-Jomart Tokayev in June 2019. Tokayev supports a culture of opposition, public assembly, and loosening rules on forming political parties. In June 2019, Tokayev established the National Council of Public Trust as a public platform for national conversation regarding government policies and reforms. In July 2019, the president of Kazakhstan announced a concept of a 'listening state' that quickly and efficiently responds to all constructive requests of the country's citizens. A law will be passed to allow representatives from other parties to hold chair positions on some Parliamentary committees, to foster alternative views and opinions. The minimum membership threshold needed to register a political party will be reduced from 40,000 to 20,000 members. Special places for peaceful rallies in central areas will be allocated and a new draft law outlining the rights and obligations of organizers, participants and observers will be passed. In an effort to increase public safety, President Tokayev has strengthened the penalties for those who commit crimes against individuals.

On 17 September 2022, Tokayev signed a decree that limits presidential tenure to one term of seven years. He furthermore announced the preparation of a new reform package to "decentralise" and "distribute" power between government institutions. The reform package also seeks to modify the electoral system and increase the decision-making authorities of Kazakhstan's regions. The powers of the parliament were expanded at the expense of those of the president, relatives of whom are now also barred from holding government positions, while the Constitutional Court was restored and the death penalty abolished.

=== Administrative divisions ===
Kazakhstan is divided into seventeen regions (Kazakh: облыстар, oblystar; Russian: области, oblasti), as well as four cities which are administered separately from their surrounding geographic regions. The regions are subdivided into 177 districts (Kazakh: аудандар, audandar; Russian: районы, rayony). The districts are further subdivided into rural districts at the lowest level of administration, which include all rural settlements and villages without an associated municipal government.

The cities of Almaty, Astana and Shymkent have official status as cities of republican significance and do not belong to their surrounding regions. The city of Baikonur also has special status because it is being leased to Russia until 2050 for the Baikonur cosmodrome. Shymkent gained its status as a "city of republican significance" in June 2018.

Each region is headed by an äkim (regional governor) appointed by the president. District äkimi are appointed by regional äkims. On 10 December 1997, Kazakhstan's government relocated its capital from Almaty, established under the Soviet Union, to Astana.

=== Municipal divisions ===
Municipalities exist at each level of administrative division in Kazakhstan. Cities of republican, regional, and district significance are designated as urban inhabited localities; all others are designated rural. At the highest level are the cities of Almaty and Astana, which are classified as cities of republican significance on the administrative level equal to that of a region. At the intermediate level are cities of regional significance on the administrative level equal to that of a district. Cities of these two levels may be divided into city districts. At the lowest level are cities of district significance, and over two-thousand villages and rural settlements (aul) on the administrative level equal to that of rural districts.

=== Foreign relations ===
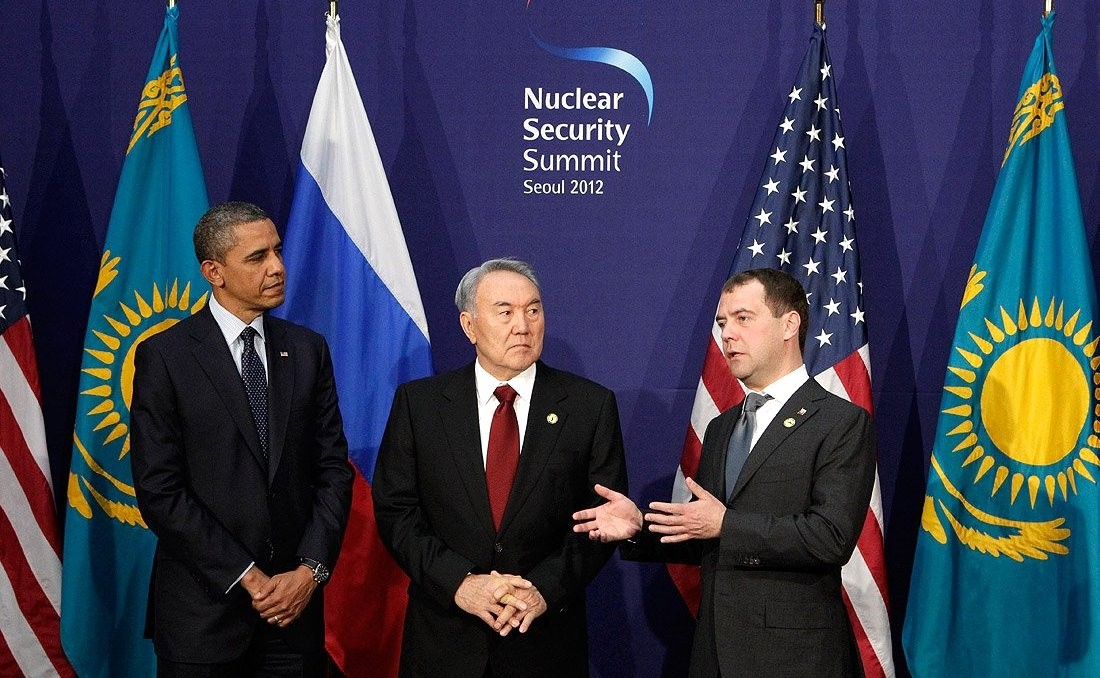
President Nazarbayev with US President Barack Obama and Russian President Dmitry Medvedev in 2012

Kazakhstan is a member of the Commonwealth of Independent States, the Economic Cooperation Organization and the Shanghai Cooperation Organization. The nations of Kazakhstan, Russia, Belarus, Kyrgyzstan and Tajikistan established the Eurasian Economic Community in 2000, to revive earlier efforts to harmonize trade tariffs and to create a free trade zone under a customs union. On 1 December 2007, it was announced that Kazakhstan had been chosen to chair the Organization for Security and Co-operation in Europe for the year 2010. Kazakhstan was elected a member of the UN Human Rights Council for the first time on 12 November 2012.

Kazakhstan is also a member of the United Nations, Organization for Security and Cooperation in Europe, Euro-Atlantic Partnership Council, Turkic Council, and Organization of Islamic Cooperation (OIC). It is an active participant in the North Atlantic Treaty Organization Partnership for Peace program.

In 1999 Kazakhstan had applied for observer status at the Council of Europe Parliamentary Assembly. The official response of the Assembly was that because Kazakhstan is partially located in Europe, it could apply for full membership, but that it would not be granted any status whatsoever at the council until its democracy and human rights records improved.

Since independence in 1991, Kazakhstan has pursued what is known as the "multi-vector foreign policy" (Kazakh: көпвекторлы сыртқы саясат, romanized: köpvektorly syrtqy saiasat), seeking equally good relations with its two large neighbours, Russia and China, as well as with the United States and the rest of the Western world. Russia leases approximately 6,000 square kilometres (2,317 sq mi) of territory enclosing the Baikonur Cosmodrome space launch site in south central Kazakhstan, where the first man was launched into space as well as Soviet space shuttle Buran and the well-known space station Mir.

On 11 April 2010 presidents Nazarbayev and Obama met at the Nuclear Security Summit in Washington, D.C., and discussed strengthening the strategic partnership between the United States and Kazakhstan. They pledged to intensify bilateral co-operation to promote nuclear safety and non-proliferation, regional stability in Central Asia, economic prosperity, and universal values.

Since 2014 the Kazakhstani government has been bidding for a non-permanent member seat on the UN Security Council for 2017–2018. On 28 June 2016 Kazakhstan was elected as a non-permanent member to serve on the UN Security Council for a two-year term.

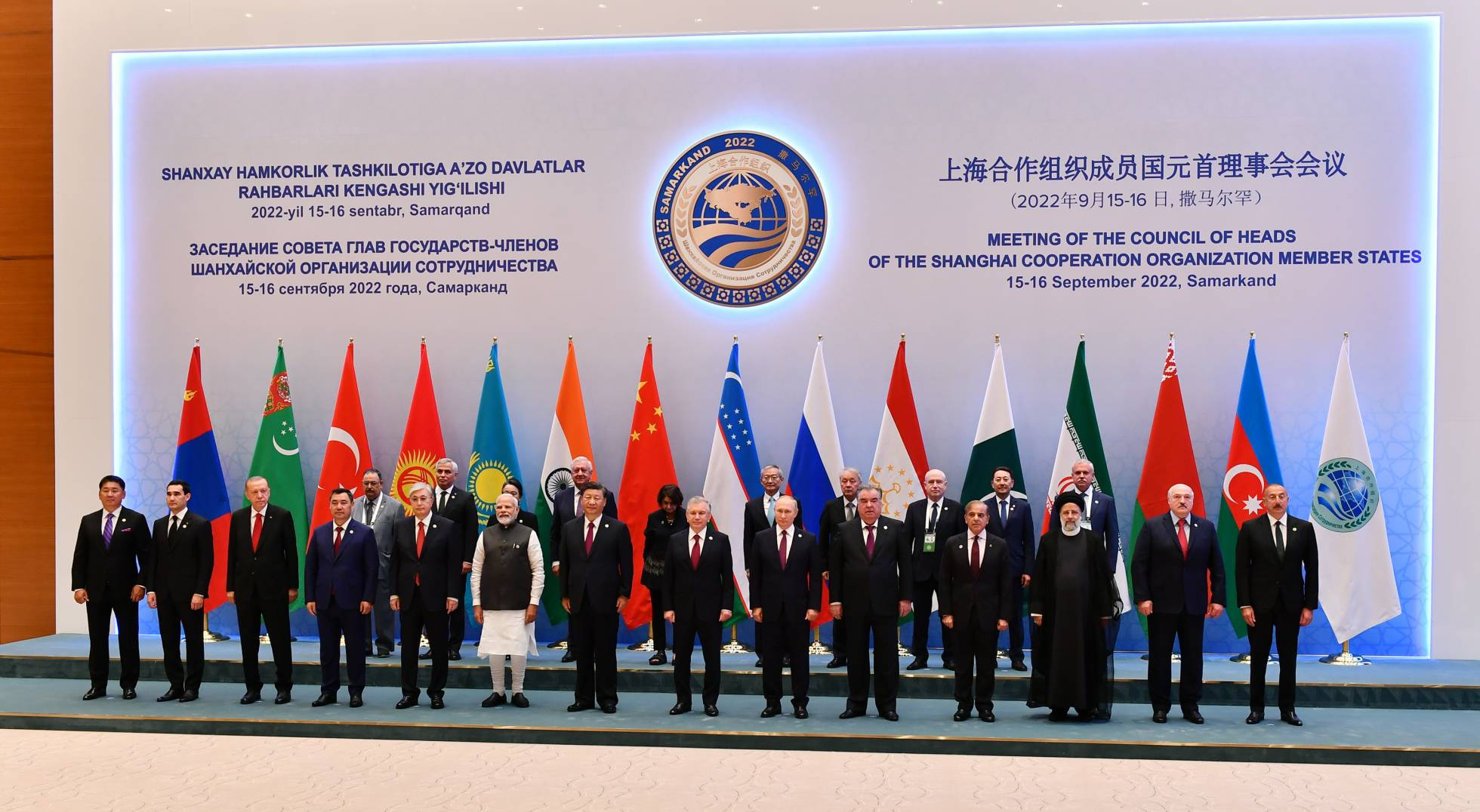
Kassym-Jomart Tokayev, Erdoğan, Xi Jinping, and other leaders at the Shanghai Cooperation Organization summit in Samarkand, 16 September 2022

Kazakhstan has supported UN peacekeeping missions in Haiti, Western Sahara, and Côte d'Ivoire. In March 2014, the Ministry of Defense chose 20 Kazakhstani military men as observers for the UN peacekeeping missions. The military personnel, ranking from captain to colonel, had to go through specialized UN training; they had to be fluent in English and skilled in using specialized military vehicles.

In 2014 Kazakhstan gave Ukraine humanitarian aid during the conflict with Russian-backed rebels. In October 2014, Kazakhstan donated $30,000 to the International Committee of the Red Cross's humanitarian effort in Ukraine. In January 2015, to help the humanitarian crisis, Kazakhstan sent $400,000 of aid to Ukraine's southeastern regions. President Nazarbayev said of the war in Ukraine, "The fratricidal war has brought true devastation to eastern Ukraine, and it is a common task to stop the war there, strengthen Ukraine's independence and secure territorial integrity of Ukraine." Experts believe that no matter how the Ukraine crisis develops, Kazakhstan's relations with the European Union will remain normal. It is believed that Nazarbayev's mediation is positively received by both Russia and Ukraine.

Kazakhstan's Ministry of Foreign Affairs released a statement on 26 January 2015: "We are firmly convinced that there is no alternative to peace negotiations as a way to resolve the crisis in south-eastern Ukraine." In 2018, Kazakhstan signed the UN treaty on the Prohibition of Nuclear Weapons.

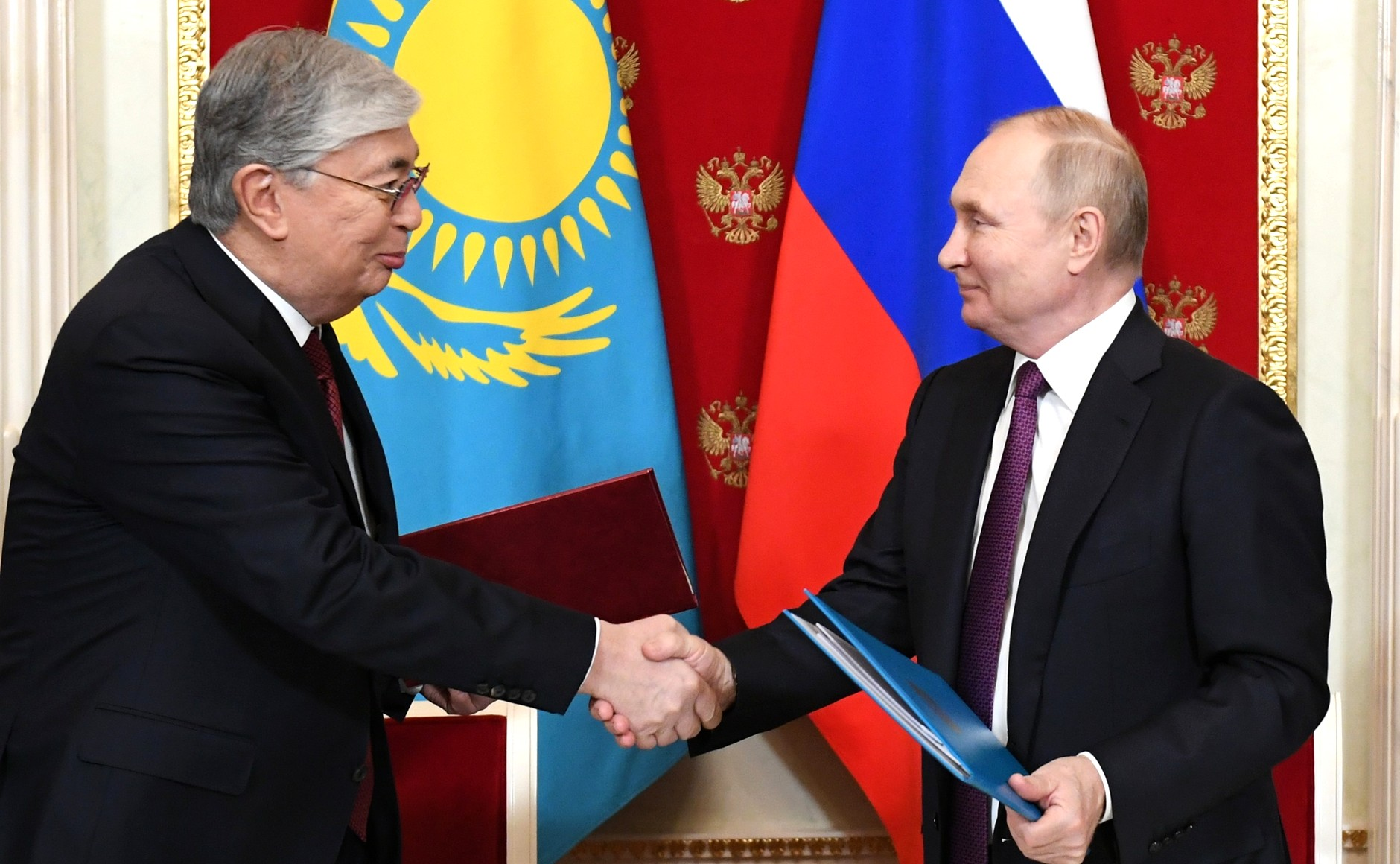
President Kassym-Jomart Tokayev with Russian President Vladimir Putin, 28 November 2022

On 6 March 2020 the Concept of the Foreign Policy of Kazakhstan for 2020–2030 was announced. The document outlines the following main points:

- An open, predictable and consistent foreign policy of the country, which is progressive in nature and maintains its endurance by continuing the course of the First President – the country at a new stage of development;
- Protection of human rights, development of humanitarian diplomacy and environmental protection;
- Promotion of the country's economic interests in the international arena, including the implementation of state policy to attract investment;
- Maintaining international peace and security;
- Development of regional and multilateral diplomacy, which primarily involves strengthening mutually beneficial ties with key partners – Russia, China, the United States, Central Asian states and the EU countries, as well as through multilateral structures – the United Nations, the Organization for Security and Co-operation in Europe, the Shanghai Cooperation Organization, the Commonwealth of Independent States, and others.

Member states of the Collective Security Treaty Organization (CSTO)

Kazakhstan's memberships of international organizations include:

- Commonwealth of Independent States (CIS)
- Collective Security Treaty Organization (CSTO)
- Shanghai Cooperation Organization
- Euro-Atlantic Partnership Council
- Individual Partnership Action Plan, with NATO, Ukraine, Georgia, Azerbaijan, Armenia, Moldova, Bosnia and Herzegovina and Montenegro
- Turkic Council and the TÜRKSOY community. (The national language, Kazakh, is related to the other Turkic languages, with which it shares cultural and historical ties)
- United Nations
- Organization for Security and Co-operation in Europe (OSCE)
- UNESCO, where Kazakhstan is a member of its World Heritage Committee
- Nuclear Suppliers Group as a participating government
- World Trade Organization
- Organization of Islamic Cooperation (OIC)
- The Abraham Accords (2025)

Based on these principles, following Russia's invasion of Ukraine in February 2022, Kazakhstan has increasingly pursued an independent foreign policy, defined by its own foreign policy objectives and ambitions through which the country attempts to balance its relations with "all the major powers and an equally principled aversion towards excessive dependence in any field upon any one of them, while also opening the country up economically to all who are willing to invest there."

Kazakhstan is the 59th most peaceful country in the world, according to the 2024 Global Peace Index.

In November 2025, after establishing diplomatic relations with Israel, the Kazakh Foreign Ministry issued a statement indicating that the nation had become a participant in the Abraham Accords to safeguard its interests, consistent with the balanced, constructive, and peaceful foreign policy of the Republic of Kazakhstan.

=== Military ===
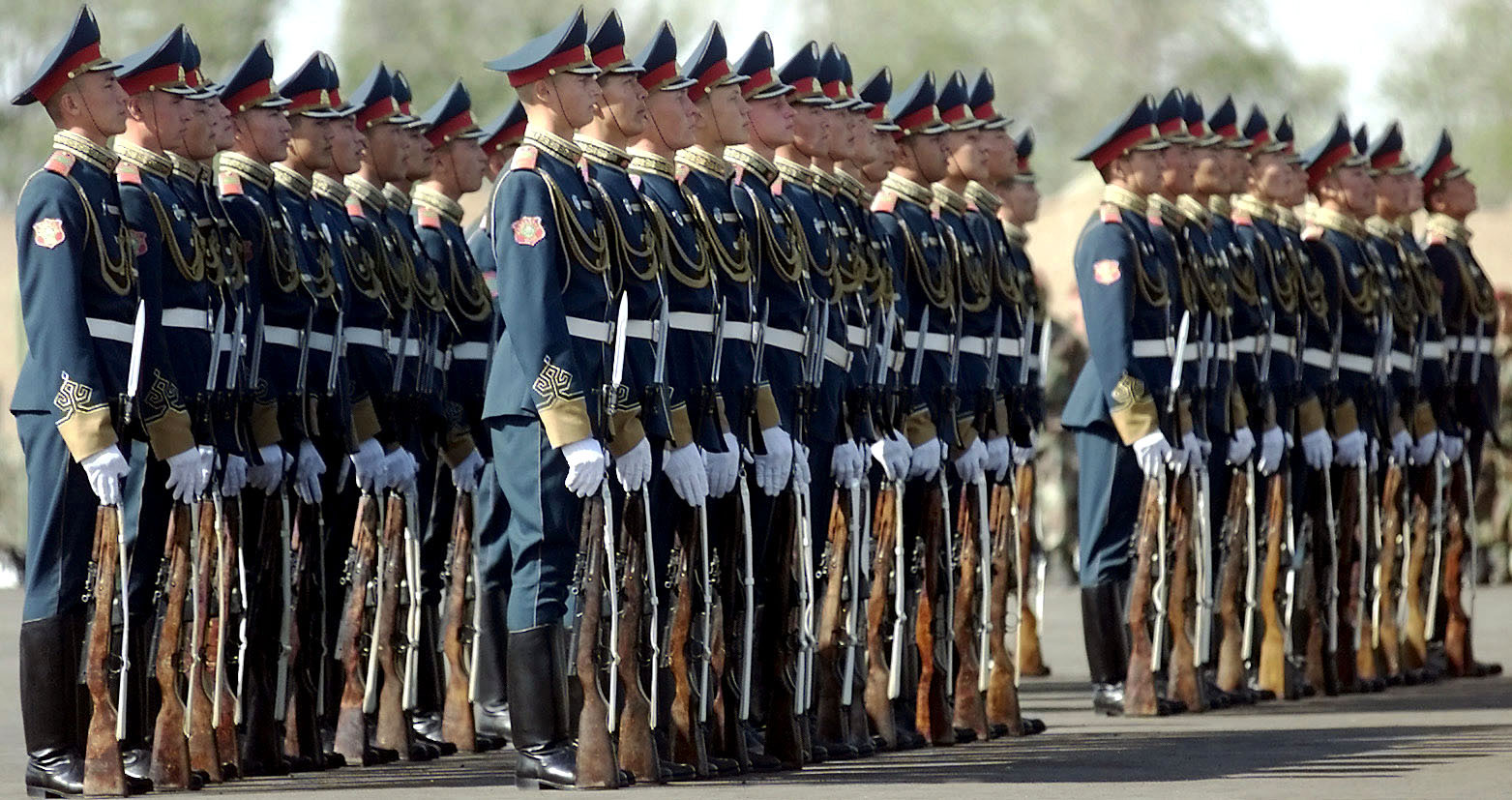
Kazakhstan Republican Guard

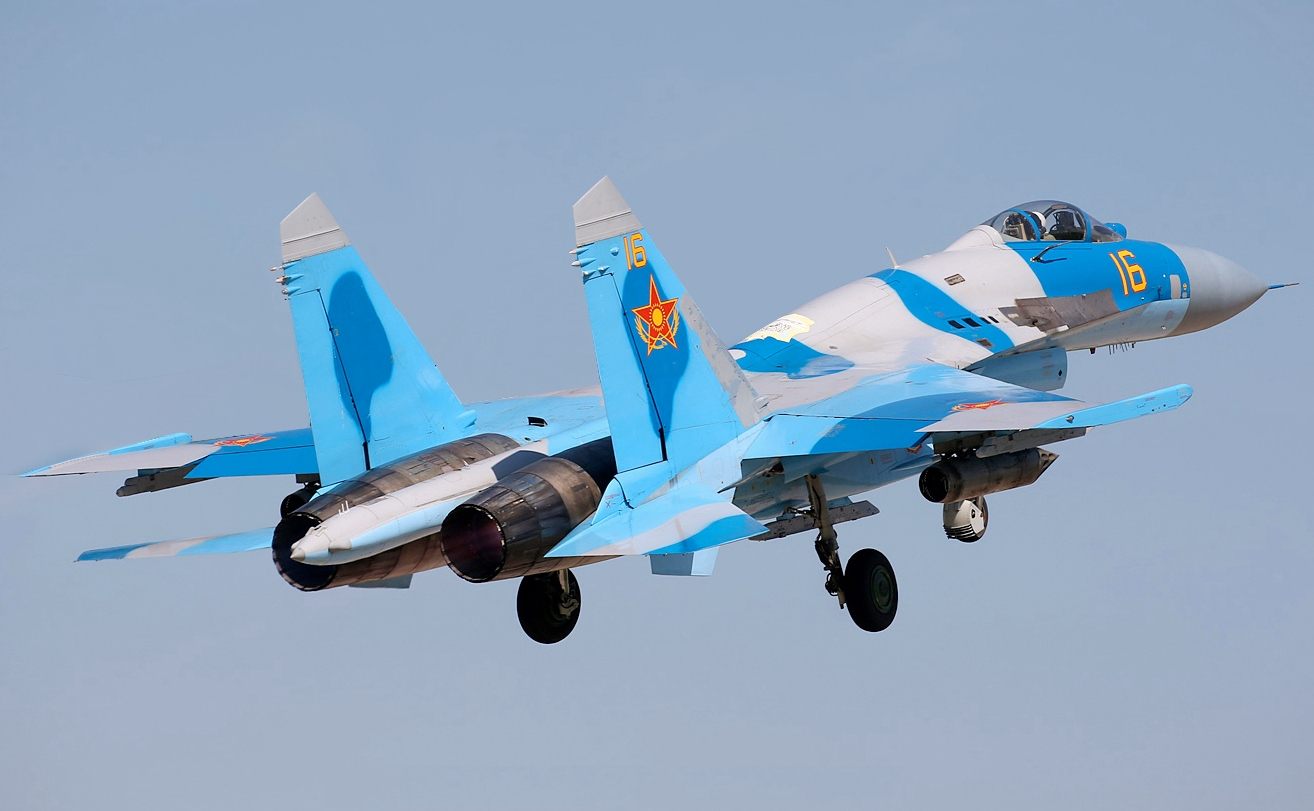
A Kazakhstani Sukhoi Su-27

Most of Kazakhstan's military was inherited from the Soviet Armed Forces' Turkestan Military District. These units became the core of Kazakhstan's new military. It acquired all the units of the 40th Army (the former 32nd Army) and part of the 17th Army Corps, including six land-force divisions, storage bases, the 14th and 35th air-landing brigades, two rocket brigades, two artillery regiments, and a large amount of equipment that had been withdrawn from over the Urals after the signing of the Treaty on Conventional Armed Forces in Europe. Since the late 20th century, the Kazakhstan Army has focused on expanding the number of its armoured units. Since 1990, armoured units have expanded from 500 to 1,613 in 2005.

The Kazakh air force is composed mostly of Soviet-era planes, including 41 MiG-29s, 44 MiG-31s, 37 Su-24s and 60 Su-27s. A small naval force is maintained on the Caspian Sea.

Kazakhstan sent 29 military engineers to Iraq to assist the US post-invasion mission in Iraq. During the second Iraq War, Kazakhstani troops dismantled 4 million mines and other explosives, helped provide medical care to more than 5,000 coalition members and civilians, and purified 718 cubic metres (25,400 cu ft) of water.

Kazakhstan's National Security Committee (UQK) was established on 13 June 1992. It includes the Service of Internal Security, Military Counterintelligence, Border Guard, several Commando units, and Foreign Intelligence (Barlau). The latter is considered the most important part of KNB. Its director is Nurtai Abykayev.

Since 2002 the joint tactical peacekeeping exercise "Steppe Eagle" has been hosted by the Kazakhstan government. "Steppe Eagle" focuses on building coalitions and gives participating nations the opportunity to work together. During the Steppe Eagle exercises, the KAZBAT peacekeeping battalion operates within a multinational force under a unified command within peacekeeping operations, with NATO and the US Military.

In December 2013 Kazakhstan announced it will send officers to support United Nations Peacekeeping forces in Haiti, Western Sahara, Ivory Coast and Liberia.

=== Political issues ===
The main political issues in Kazakhstan were low personal incomes, inflation, corruption and unemployment according to a 2026 Kazakhstan Institute of Public Development poll.

A 2017 OECD report on Kazakhstan indicated that Kazakhstan has reformed laws with regard to the civil service, judiciary, instruments to prevent corruption, access to information, and prosecuting corruption in Kazakhstan. Kazakhstan has implemented anticorruption reforms that have been recognized by organizations like Transparency International.

In 2011 Switzerland confiscated US$48 million in Kazakhstani assets from Swiss bank accounts, as a result of a bribery investigation in the United States. US officials believed the funds represented bribes paid by American officials to Kazakhstani officials in exchange for oil or prospecting rights in Kazakhstan. Proceedings eventually involved US$84 million in the US and another US$60 million in Switzerland.

The Federal Bureau of Investigation (FBI) and the Kazakh Anti-Corruption Agency signed a Mutual Legal Assistance Treaty in February 2015.

==== Human rights ====
Kazakhstan was ranked 142nd out of 180 countries in Reporters Without Borders' Press Freedom Index for 2024; previously it ranked 134th for 2023.

Kazakhstan's human rights situation has been described as poor by independent observers. In its 2015 report of human rights in the country, Human Rights Watch said that "Kazakhstan heavily restricts freedom of assembly, speech, and religion." It has also described the government as authoritarian. In 2014, authorities closed newspapers, jailed or fined dozens of people after peaceful but unsanctioned protests, and fined or detained worshipers for practising religion outside state controls. Government critics, including opposition leader Vladimir Kozlov, remained in detention after unfair trials. In mid-2014, Kazakhstan adopted new criminal, criminal executive, criminal procedural, and administrative codes, and a new law on trade unions, which contain articles restricting fundamental freedoms and are incompatible with international standards. Torture remains common in places of detention." However, Kazakhstan has achieved significant progress in reducing the prison population. The 2016 Human Rights Watch report commented that Kazakhstan "took few meaningful steps to tackle a worsening human rights record in 2015, maintaining a focus on economic development over political reform." Some critics of the government have been arrested for allegedly spreading false information about the COVID-19 pandemic in Kazakhstan. Various police reforms, like creation of local police service and zero-tolerance policing, aimed at bringing police closer to local communities, have not improved cooperation between policemen and ordinary citizens.

According to a US government report released in 2014, in Kazakhstan:

The law does not require police to inform detainees that they have the right to an attorney, and police did not do so. Human rights observers alleged that law enforcement officials dissuaded detainees from seeing an attorney, gathered evidence through preliminary questioning before a detainee's attorney arrived, and in some cases used corrupt defense attorneys to gather evidence.

[...]The law does not provide for an independent judiciary. The executive branch sharply limited judicial independence. Prosecutors enjoyed a quasi-judicial role and had the authority to suspend court decisions.

Corruption was evident at every stage of the judicial process. Although judges were among the most highly paid government employees, lawyers and human rights monitors alleged that judges, prosecutors, and other officials solicited bribes in exchange for favorable rulings in the majority of criminal cases.

Kazakhstan's global rank in the World Justice Project's 2015 Rule of Law Index was 65 out of 102; the country scored well on "Order and Security" (global rank 32/102), and poorly on "Constraints on Government Powers" (global rank 93/102), "Open Government" (85/102) and "Fundamental Rights" (84/102, with a downward trend marking a deterioration in conditions).

The ABA Rule of Law Initiative of the American Bar Association has programs to train justice sector professionals in Kazakhstan.

Kazakhstan's Supreme Court has taken steps to modernise and to increase transparency and oversight over the country's legal system. With funding from the US Agency for International Development, the ABA Rule of Law Initiative began a new program in April 2012 to strengthen the independence and accountability of Kazakhstan's judiciary.

In an effort to increase transparency in the criminal justice and court system, and improve human rights, Kazakhstan intended to digitize all investigative, prosecutorial and court records by 2018. Many criminal cases are closed before trial on the basis of reconciliation between the defendant and the victim because they simplify the work of the law-enforcement officers, release the defendant from punishment, and pay little regard to the victim's rights.

Homosexuality has been legal in Kazakhstan since 1997, although it is still socially unacceptable in most areas. Discrimination against LGBT people in Kazakhstan is widespread.

== Economy ==
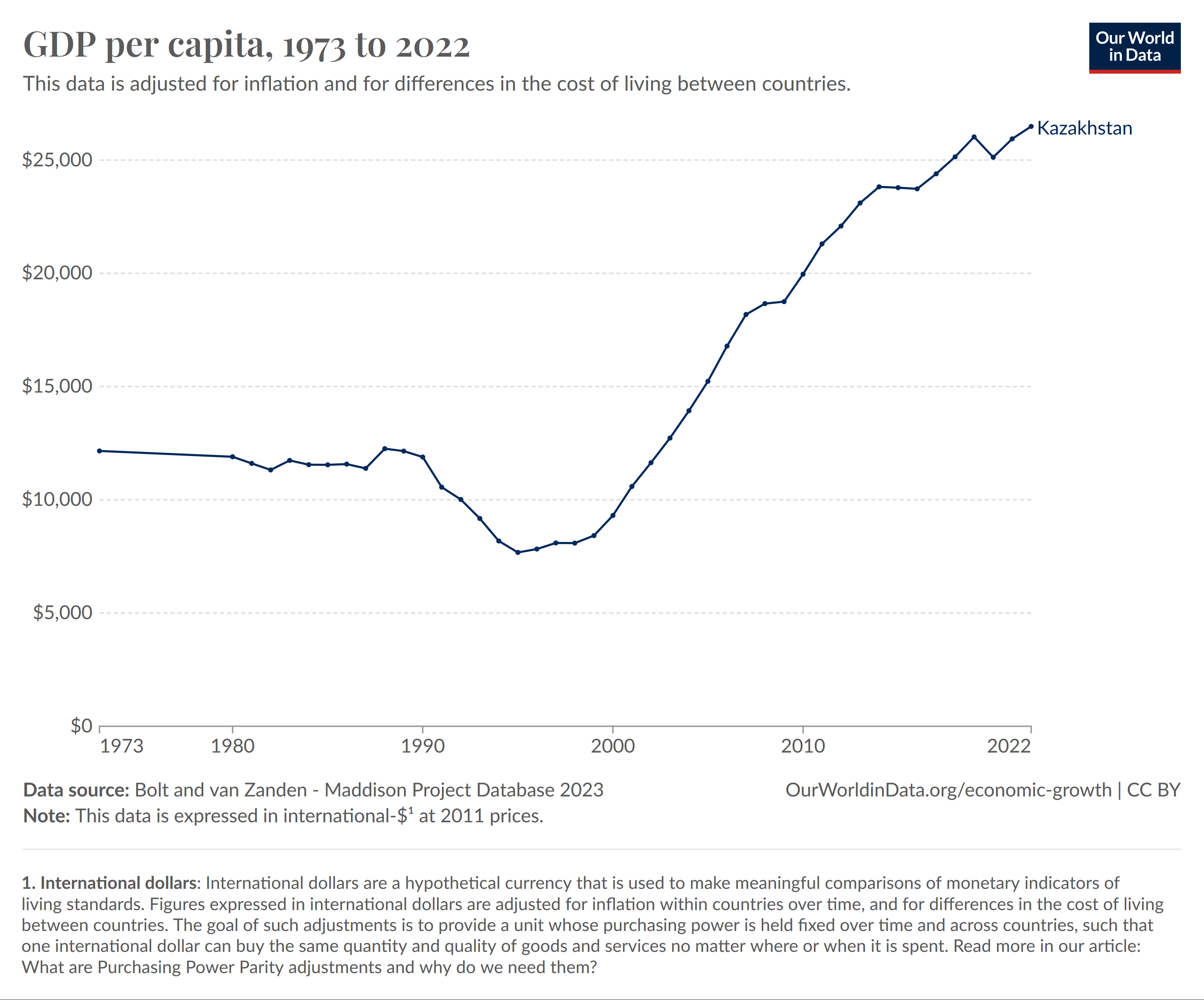
GDP per capita development in Kazakhstan since 1973

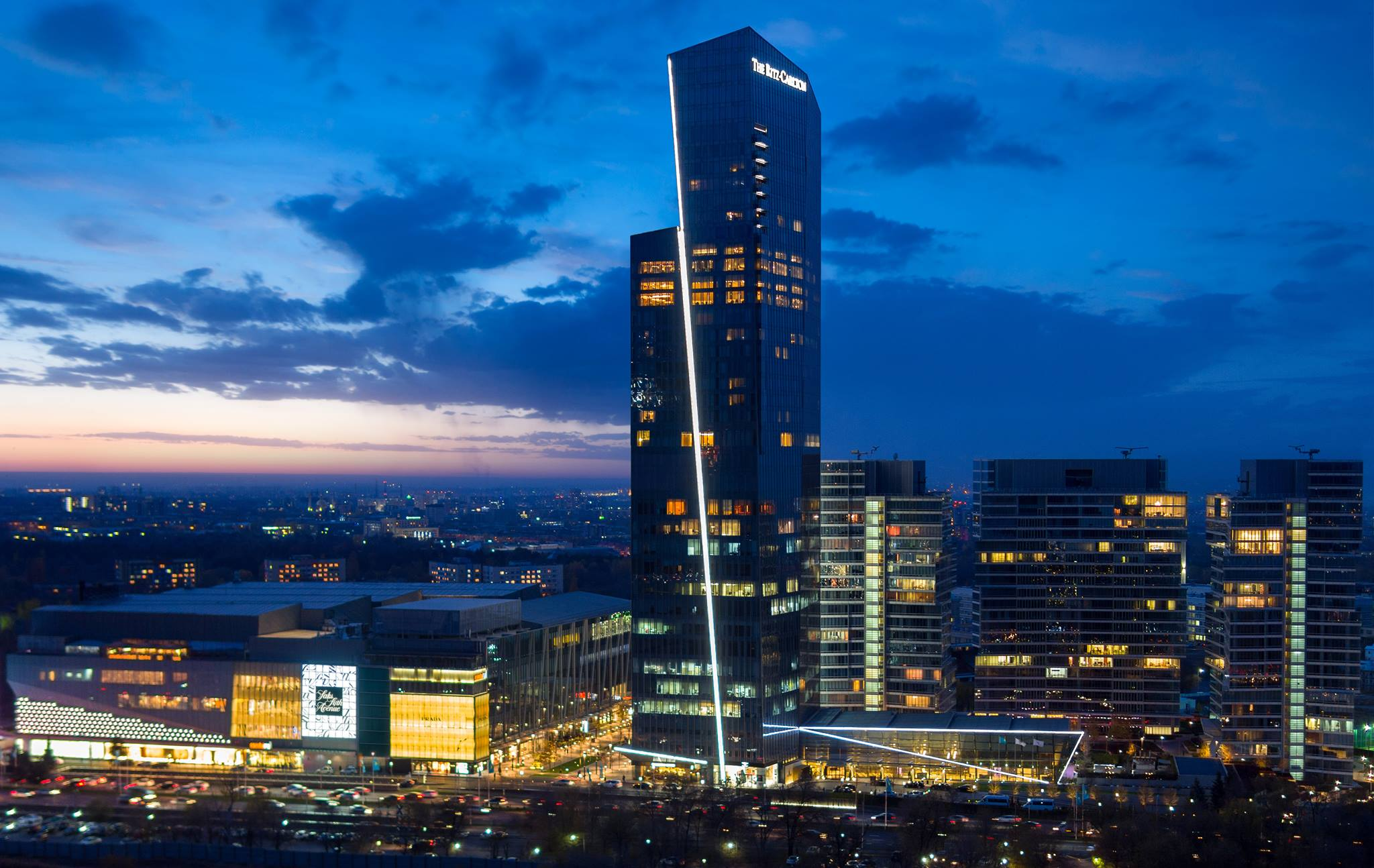
A multifunctional building and financial centre of the city of Almaty

In 2018, Kazakhstan had a GDP of $179.332 billion and an annual growth rate of 4.5%. Per capita, Kazakhstan's GDP stood at $9,686. Buoyed by high world crude oil prices, GDP growth figures were between 8.9% and 13.5% from 2000 to 2007 before decreasing to 1% to 3% during the 2008 financial crisis, and then rising again from 2010. Other major exports of Kazakhstan include wheat, textiles, and livestock. Kazakhstan is a leading exporter of uranium.

Kazakhstan's economy grew by 4.6% in 2014. The country experienced a slowdown in economic growth from 2014 sparked by a falling price of oil and the effects of the Russo-Ukrainian War. The country devalued its currency by 19% in February 2014. Another 22% devaluation occurred in August 2015. Kazakhstan was the first former Soviet Republic to repay all of its debt to the International Monetary Fund, 7 years ahead of schedule.

Kazakhstan weathered the 2008 financial crisis by combining fiscal relaxation with monetary stabilization. In 2009, the government introduced large-scale support measures such as the recapitalization of banks and support for the real estate and agricultural sectors, as well as for small and medium enterprises (SMEs). The total value of the stimulus programs amounted to $21 billion, or 20% of the country's GDP, with $4 billion going to stabilize the financial sector. During the Great Recession, Kazakhstan's economy contracted by 1.2% in 2009, but increased to 7.5% and 5% in 2011 and 2012, respectively. Kazakhstan's government continued to follow a conservative fiscal policy by controlling budget spending and accumulating oil revenue savings in its Oil Fund – Samruk-Kazyna. The 2008 financial crisis forced Kazakhstan to increase its public borrowing to support the economy. Public debt increased to 13.4% in 2013 from 8.7% in 2008. Between 2012 and 2013, the government achieved an overall fiscal surplus of 4.5%.

In March 2002 the US Department of Commerce granted Kazakhstan market economy status under US trade law. This change in status recognized substantive market economy reforms in the areas of currency convertibility, wage rate determination, openness to foreign investment, and government control over the means of production and allocation of resources. In September 2002, Kazakhstan became the first country in the CIS to receive an investment grade credit rating from a major international credit rating agency. By late December 2003, Kazakhstan's gross foreign debt was about $22.9 billion. Total governmental debt was $4.2 billion, 14% of GDP. There has been a reduction in the ratio of debt to GDP. The ratio of total governmental debt to GDP was 21.7% in 2000, 17.5% in 2001, and 15.4% in 2002. In 2019, it rose to 19.2%.

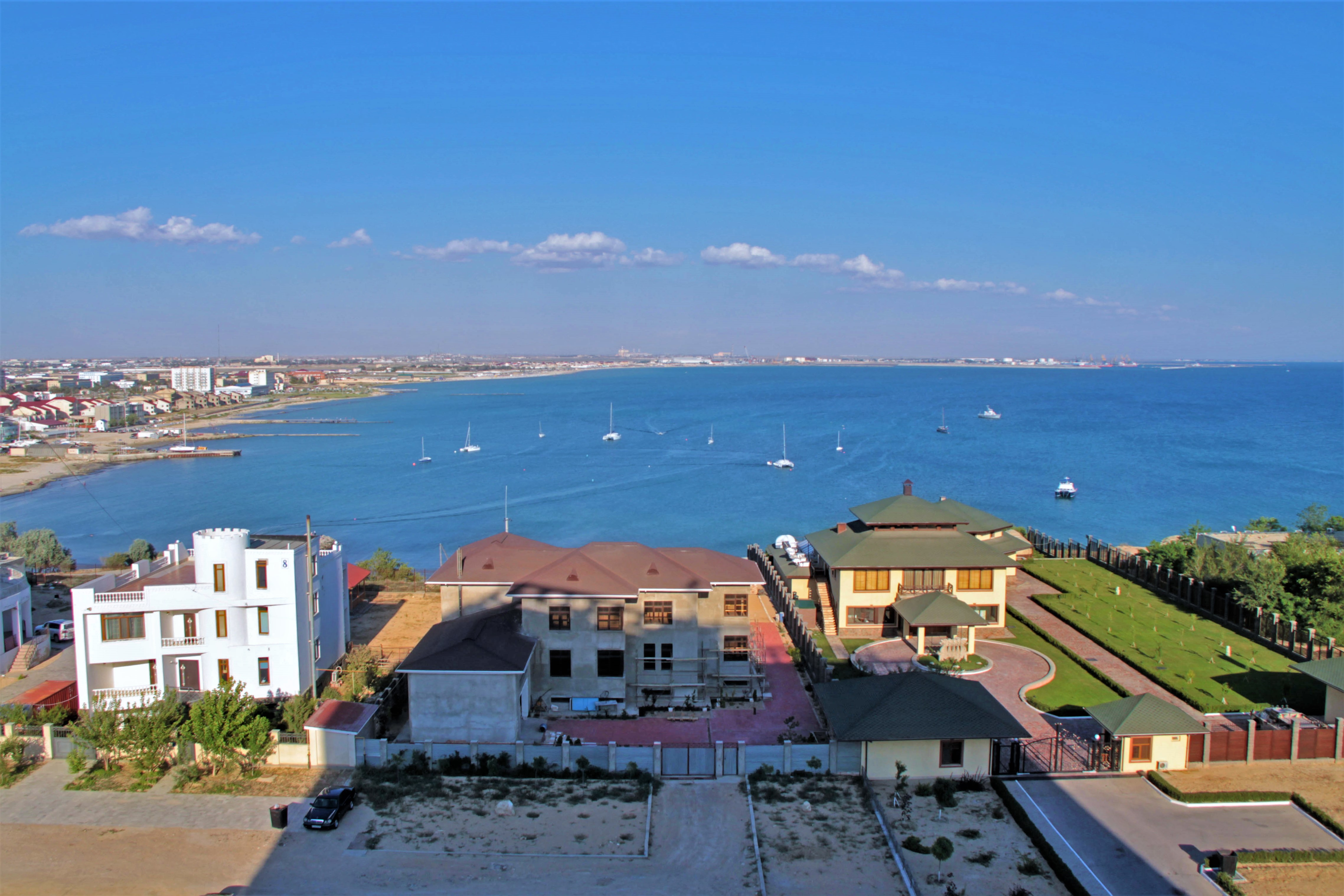
Aqtau is Kazakhstan's only seaport on the Caspian Sea.

On 29 November 2003 the Law on Changes to Tax Code, which reduced tax rates, was adopted. The value added tax fell from 16% to 15%, the social tax, payable by all employers, from 21% to 20%, and the personal income tax from 30% to 20%. On 7 July 2006, the personal income tax was reduced even further to a flat rate of 5% for personal income in the form of dividends and 10% for other personal income. Kazakhstan furthered its reforms by adopting a new land code on 20 June 2003 and a new customs code on 5 April 2003.

Kazakhstan instituted a pension reform program in 1998. By January 2012 the pension assets were about $17 billion (KZT 2.5 trillion). There are 11 savings pension funds in the country. The State Accumulating Pension Fund, the only state-owned fund, was privatized in 2006. The country's unified financial regulatory agency oversees and regulates pension funds. The growing demand of pension funds for investment outlets triggered the development of the debt securities market. Pension fund capital is being invested almost exclusively in corporate and government bonds, including the government of Kazakhstan Eurobonds. The government of Kazakhstan was studying a project to create a unified national pension fund and transfer all the accounts from the private pension funds into it.

Kazakhstan climbed to 41st on the 2018 Economic Freedom Index published by The Wall Street Journal and The Heritage Foundation.

=== Foreign trade ===
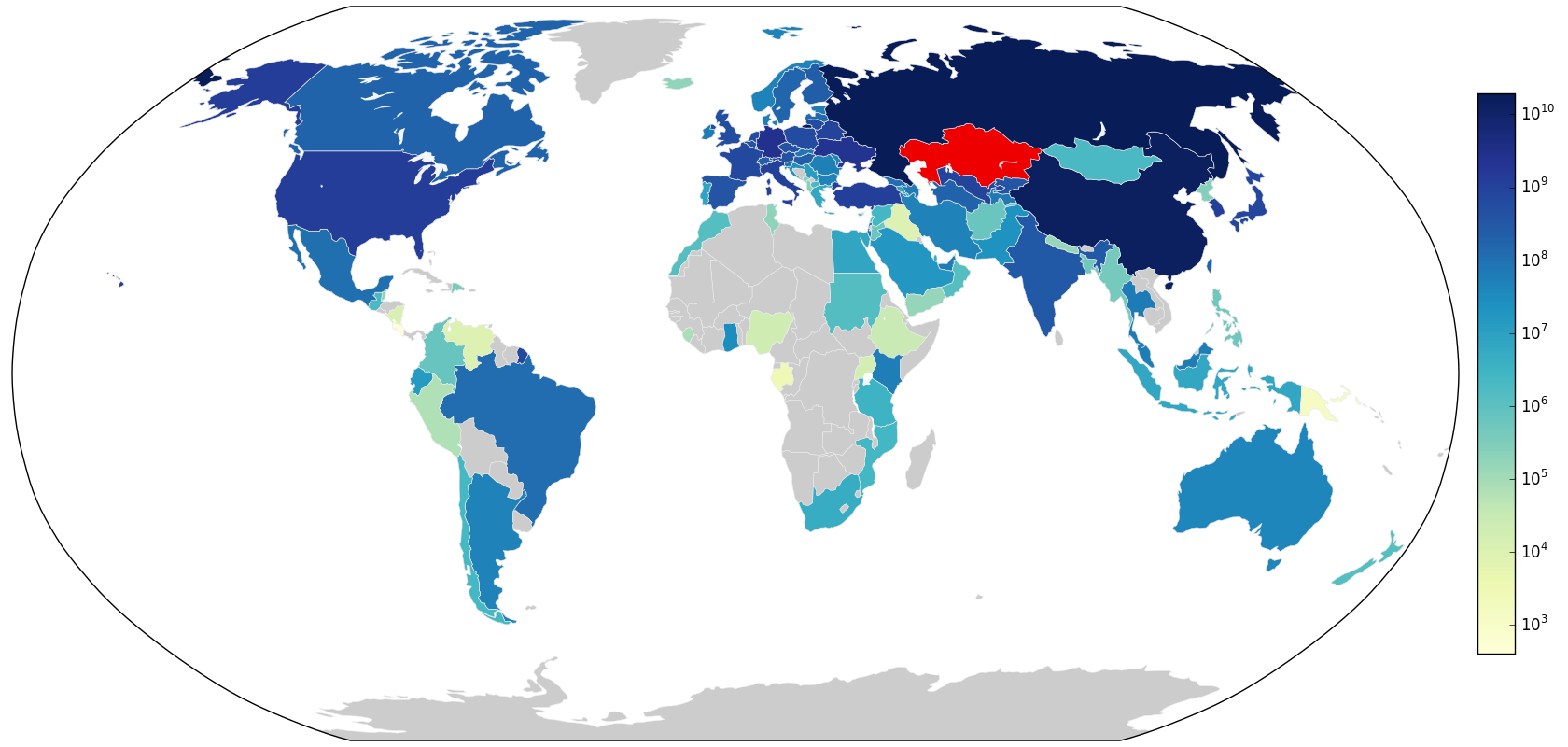
A map of Kazakhstan's imports, 2013

Kazakhstan's increased role in global trade and central positioning on the new Silk Road gave the country the potential to open its markets to billions of people. Kazakhstan joined the World Trade Organization in 2015.

Kazakhstan's foreign trade turnover in 2018 was $93.5 billion, which is 19.7% more than in 2017. Exports in 2018 reached $67 billion (up 25.7% in comparison to 2017) and imports were $32.5 billion (up 9.9% in comparison to 2017). Exports accounted for 40.1% of Kazakhstan's gross domestic product (GDP) in 2018. Kazakhstan exports 800 products to 120 countries.

=== Agriculture ===
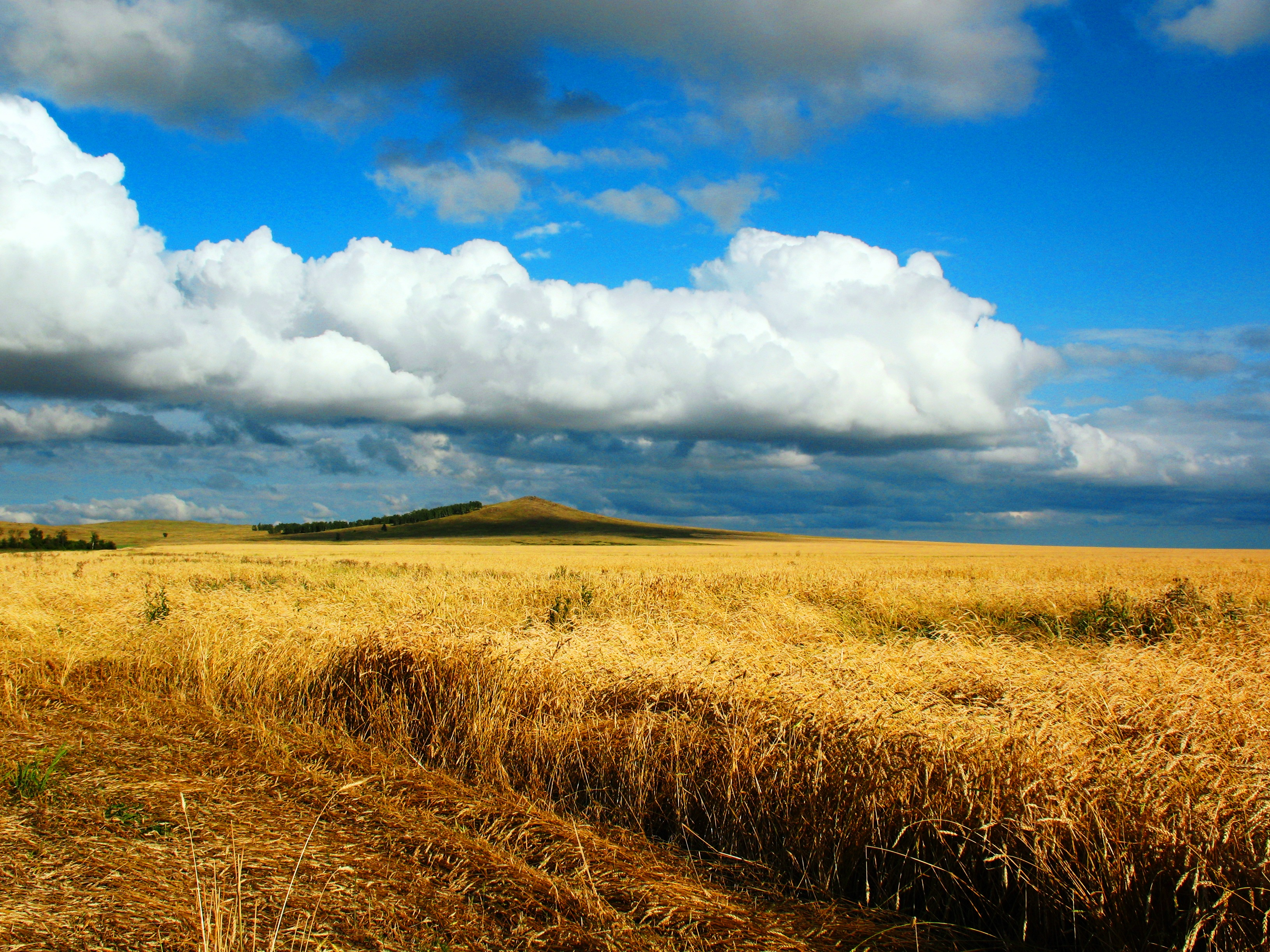
Grain fields near Kökşetau

Agriculture accounts for approximately 5% of Kazakhstan's GDP. Grain, potatoes, grapes, vegetables, melons and livestock are the most important agricultural commodities. Agricultural land occupies more than 846,000 square kilometres (327,000 sq mi). The available agricultural land consists of 205,000 km^{2} (79,000 sq mi) of arable land and 611,000 km^{2} (236,000 sq mi) of pasture and hay land. Over 80% of the country's total area is classified as agricultural land, including almost 70% occupied by pasture. Its arable land has the second highest availability per inhabitant (1.5 hectares).

Chief livestock products are dairy products, leather, meat, and wool. The country's major crops include wheat, barley, cotton, and rice. Wheat exports, a major source of hard currency, rank among the leading commodities in Kazakhstan's export trade. In 2003, Kazakhstan harvested 17.6 million tons of grain in gross, 2.8% higher compared to 2002. Kazakhstani agriculture still has many environmental problems from mismanagement during its years in the Soviet Union. Some Kazakh wine is produced in the mountains to the east of Almaty.

=== Energy ===
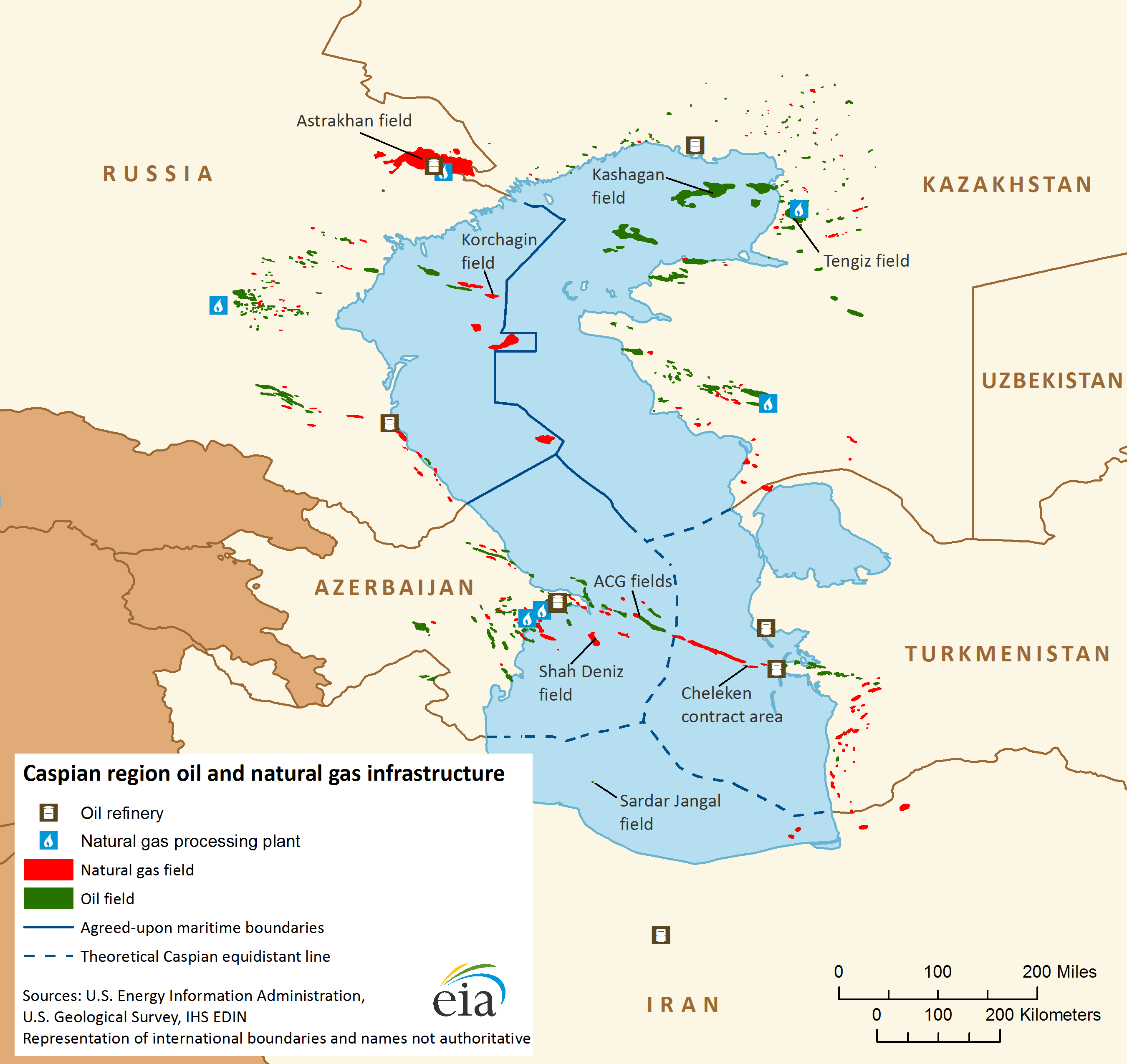
Kazakhstan has one of the largest proven oil reserves in the Caspian Sea region.

Energy has been the leading economic sector. Production of crude oil and natural gas condensate from the oil and gas basins of Kazakhstan amounted to 79.2 million tonnes (77.9 million long tons; 87.3 million short tons) in 2012 up from 51.2 million tonnes (50.4 million long tons; 56.4 million short tons) in 2003. Kazakhstan raised oil and gas condensate exports to 44.3 million tons in 2003, 13% higher than in 2002. Gas production in Kazakhstan in 2003 amounted to 13.9 billion cubic metres (490 billion cubic feet), up 22.7% compared to 2002, including natural gas production of 7.3 billion cubic metres (260 billion cubic feet). Kazakhstan holds about 4 billion tonnes (3.9 billion long tons; 4.4 billion short tons) of proven recoverable oil reserves and 2,000 cubic kilometres (480 cubic miles) of gas. Kazakhstan is the 19th largest oil-producing nation in the world. Kazakhstan's oil exports in 2003, were valued at more than $7 billion, representing 65% of overall exports and 24% of the GDP. Major oil and gas fields and recoverable oil reserves are Tengiz with 7 billion barrels (1.1 billion cubic metres); Karachaganak with 8 billion barrels (1.3 billion cubic metres) and 1,350 cubic kilometres (320 cubic miles) of natural gas; and Kashagan with 7 to 9 billion barrels (1.4 billion cubic metres).

KazMunayGas (KMG), the national oil and gas company, was created in 2002 to represent the interests of the state in the oil and gas industry. The Tengiz Field was jointly developed in 1993 as a 40-year Tengizchevroil venture between Chevron Texaco (50%), US ExxonMobil (25%), KazMunayGas (20%), and LukArco (5%). The Karachaganak natural gas and gas condensate field is being developed by BG, Agip, ChevronTexaco, and Lukoil. Also Chinese oil companies are involved in Kazakhstan's oil industry.

Kazakhstan launched the Green Economy Plan in 2013. It committed Kazakhstan to meet 50% of its energy needs from alternative and renewable sources by 2050. The green economy was projected to increase GDP by 3% and create some 500,000 jobs. The government set prices for energy produced from renewable sources. The price of 1 kilowatt-hour for energy produced by wind power plants was set at 22.68 tenge ($0.12), for 1 kilowatt-hour produced by small hydro-power plants 16.71 tenges ($0.09), and from biogas plants 32.23 tenges ($0.18).

=== Infrastructure ===
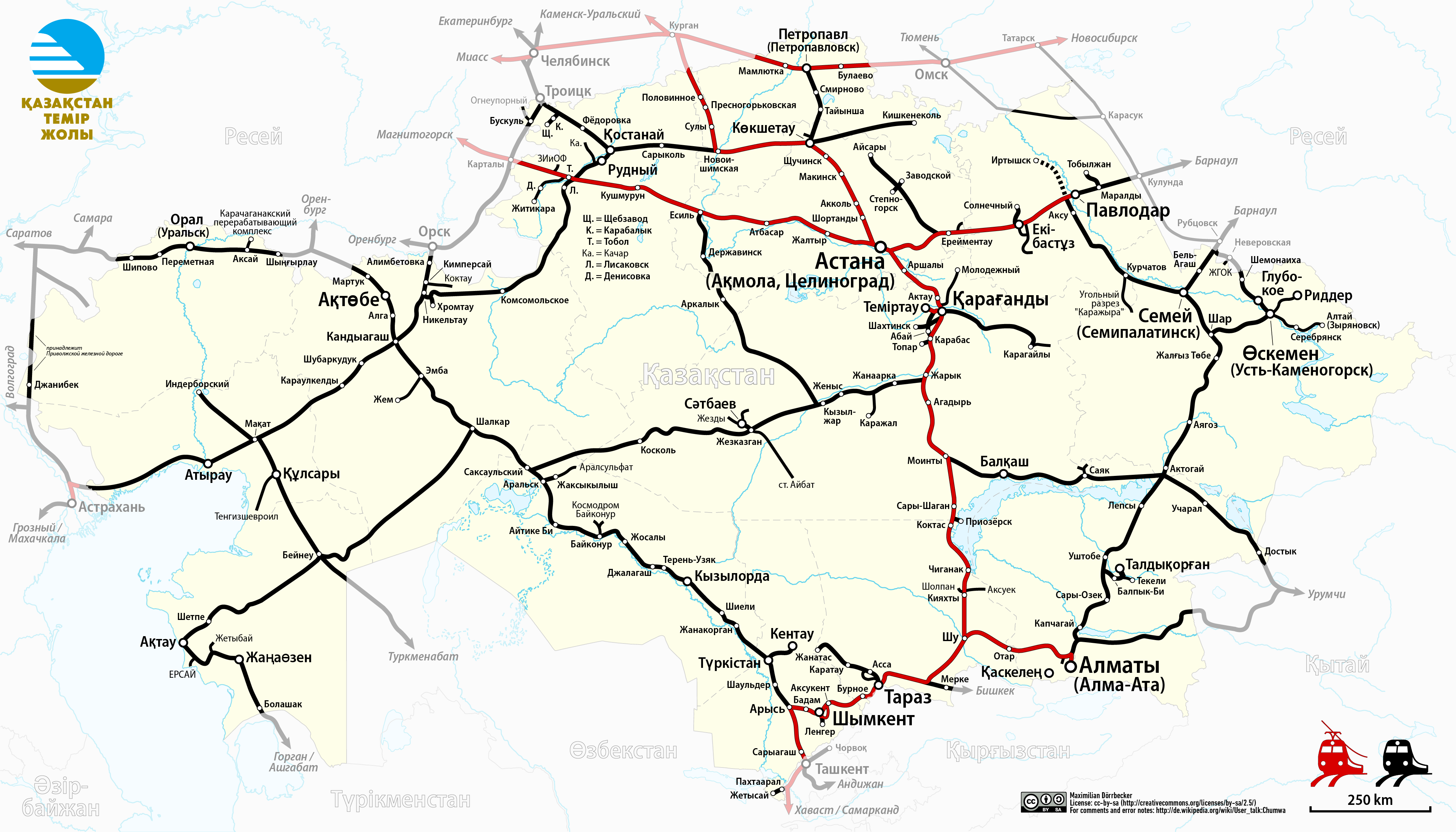
Kazakhstan's railway network

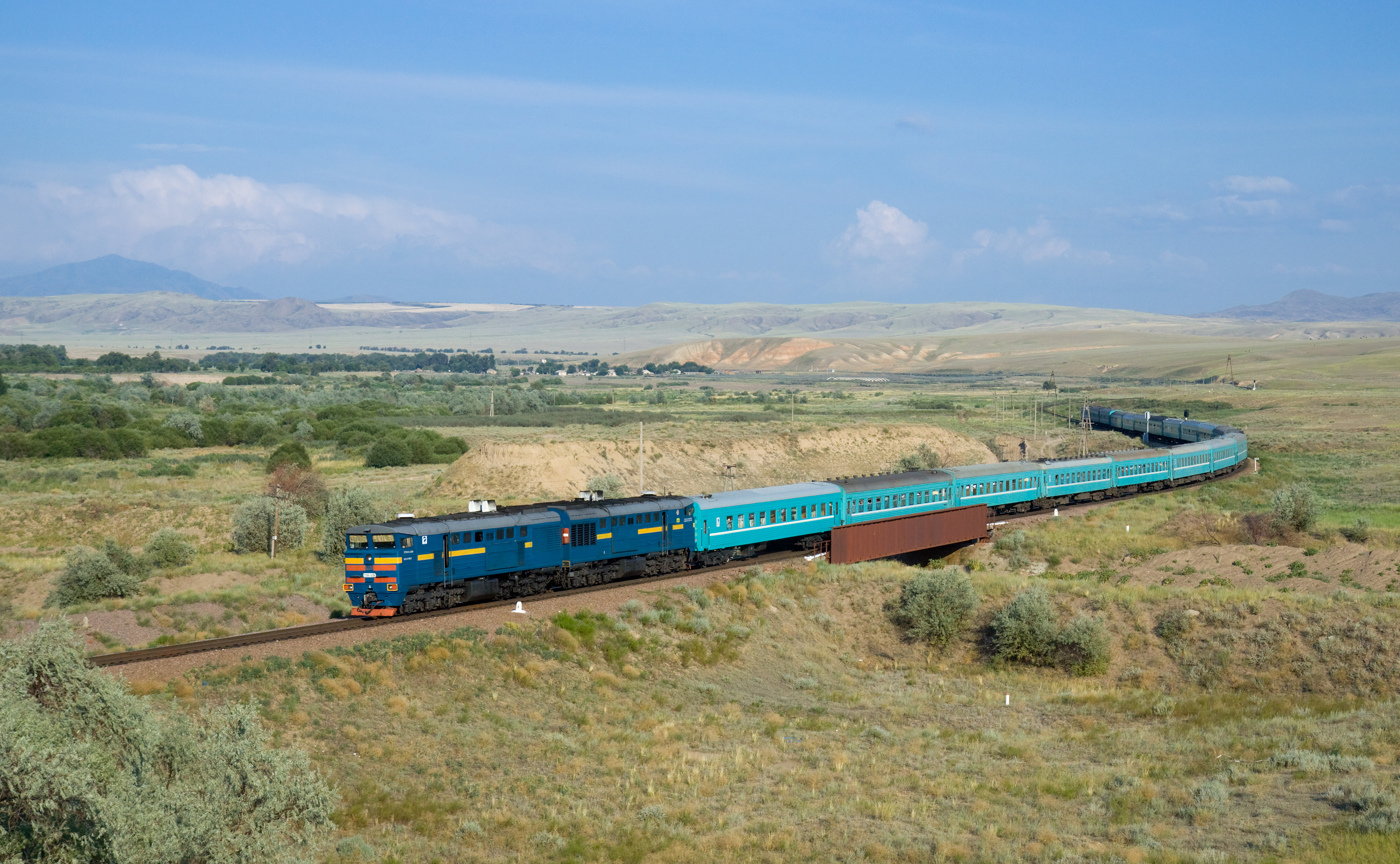
Train 22 Kyzylorda – Semipalatinsk, hauled by a Kazakhstan Temir Zholy 2TE10U diesel locomotive. Picture taken near Aynabulak, Kazakhstan.

Railways provide 68% of all cargo and passenger traffic to over 57% of the country. There are 15,333 km (9,527 mi) in common carrier service, excluding industrial lines. 15,333 km (9,527 mi) of 1,520 mm (4 ft 11 27/32 in) gauge, 4,000 km (2,500 mi) electrified, in 2012. Most cities are connected by railroad; high-speed trains go from Almaty (the southernmost city) to Petropavl (the northernmost city) in about 18 hours.

Kazakhstan Temir Zholy (KTZ) is the national railway company. KTZ cooperates with French locomotive manufacturer Alstom in developing Kazakhstan's railway infrastructure. As of 2018, Alstom has more than 600 staff and two joint ventures with KTZ and its subsidiary in Kazakhstan. In July 2017, Alstom opened its first locomotive repairing centre in Kazakhstan. It is the only repairing centre in Central Asia and the Caucasus. Astana Nurly Zhol railway station, the most modern railway station in Kazakhstan, was opened in Astana on 31 May 2017. According to Kazakhstan Railways (KTZ), the 120,000 m^{2} (1,300,000 ft^{2}) station was expected to be used by 54 trains and would have the capacity to handle 35,000 passengers a day.

There is a small 8.56 km (5.32 mi) metro system in Almaty. Second and third metro lines were planned for the future. The second line would intersect with the first line at Alatau and Zhibek Zholy stations. The Astana Metro system has been under construction, but was abandoned at one point in 2013. In May 2015, an agreement was signed for the project to be resumed. There is an 86 km (53 mi) tram network, which began service in 1965 with, as of 2012, 20 regular and three special routes.

The Khorgos Gateway dry port is one of Kazakhstan's primary dry ports for handling trans-Eurasian trains, which travel more than 9,000 km (5,600 mi) between China and Europe. The Khorgos Gateway dry port is surrounded by Khorgos Eastern Gate SEZ, which officially commenced operations in December 2016.

In 2009 the European Commission blacklisted all Kazakh air carriers with a sole exception of Air Astana. Thereafter, Kazakhstan took measures to modernise and revamp its air safety oversight. In 2016 the European air safety authorities removed all Kazakh airlines from the blacklist, saying there was "sufficient evidence of compliance" with international standards by Kazakh Airlines and the Civil Aviation Committee.

=== Tourism ===
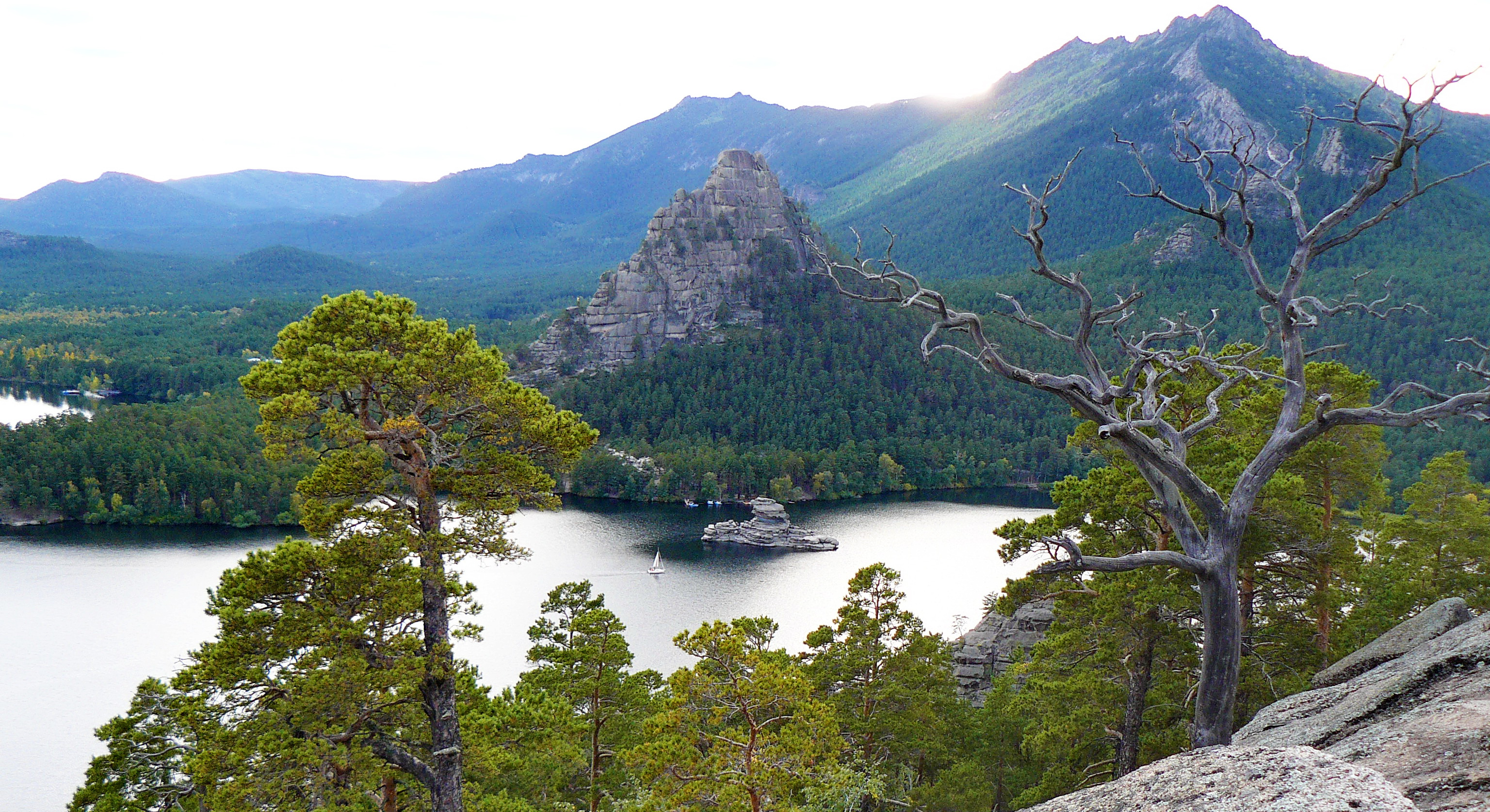
Lake Burabay, view from Mount Bolectau

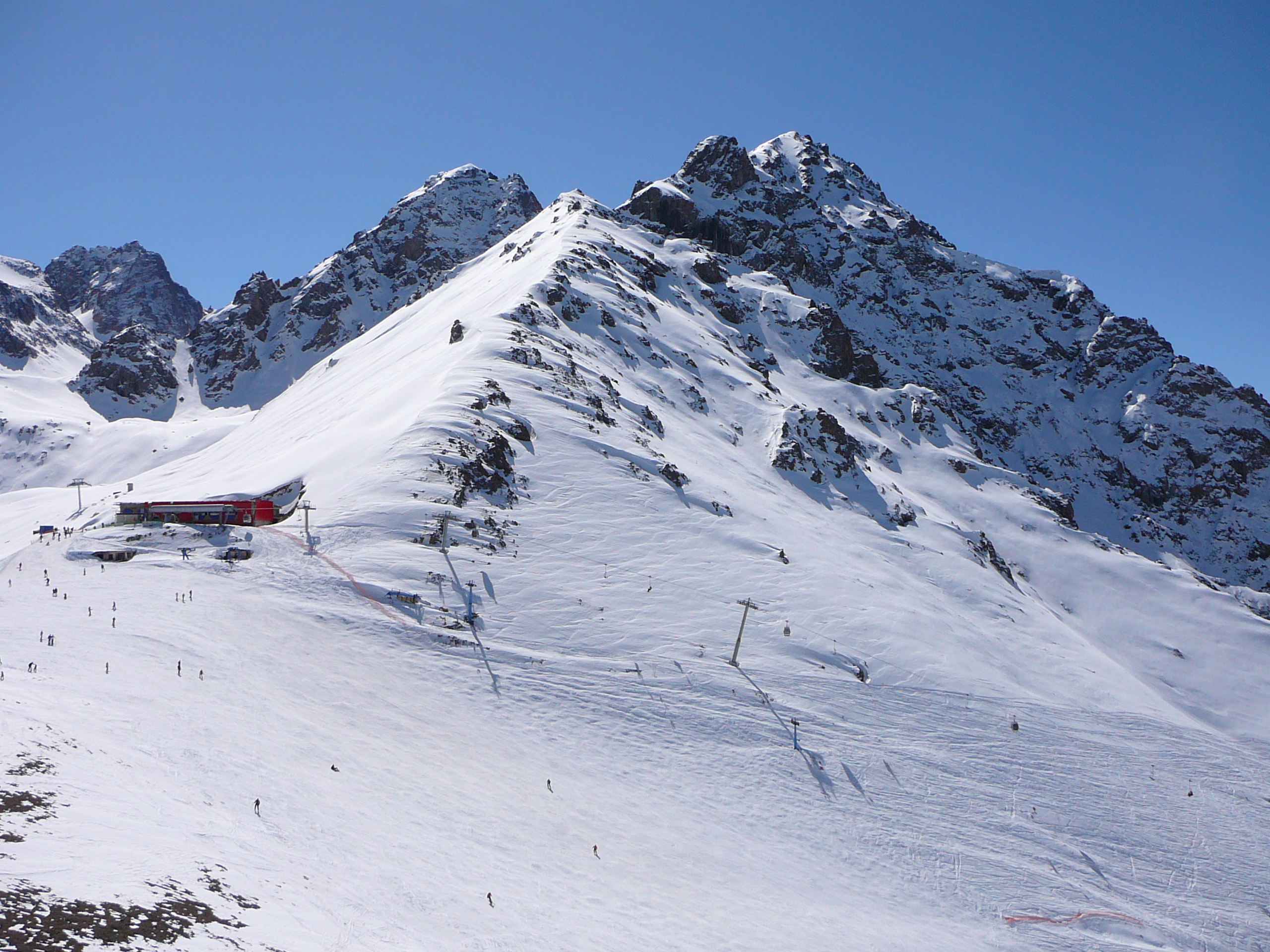
Shymbulak ski resort in Almaty

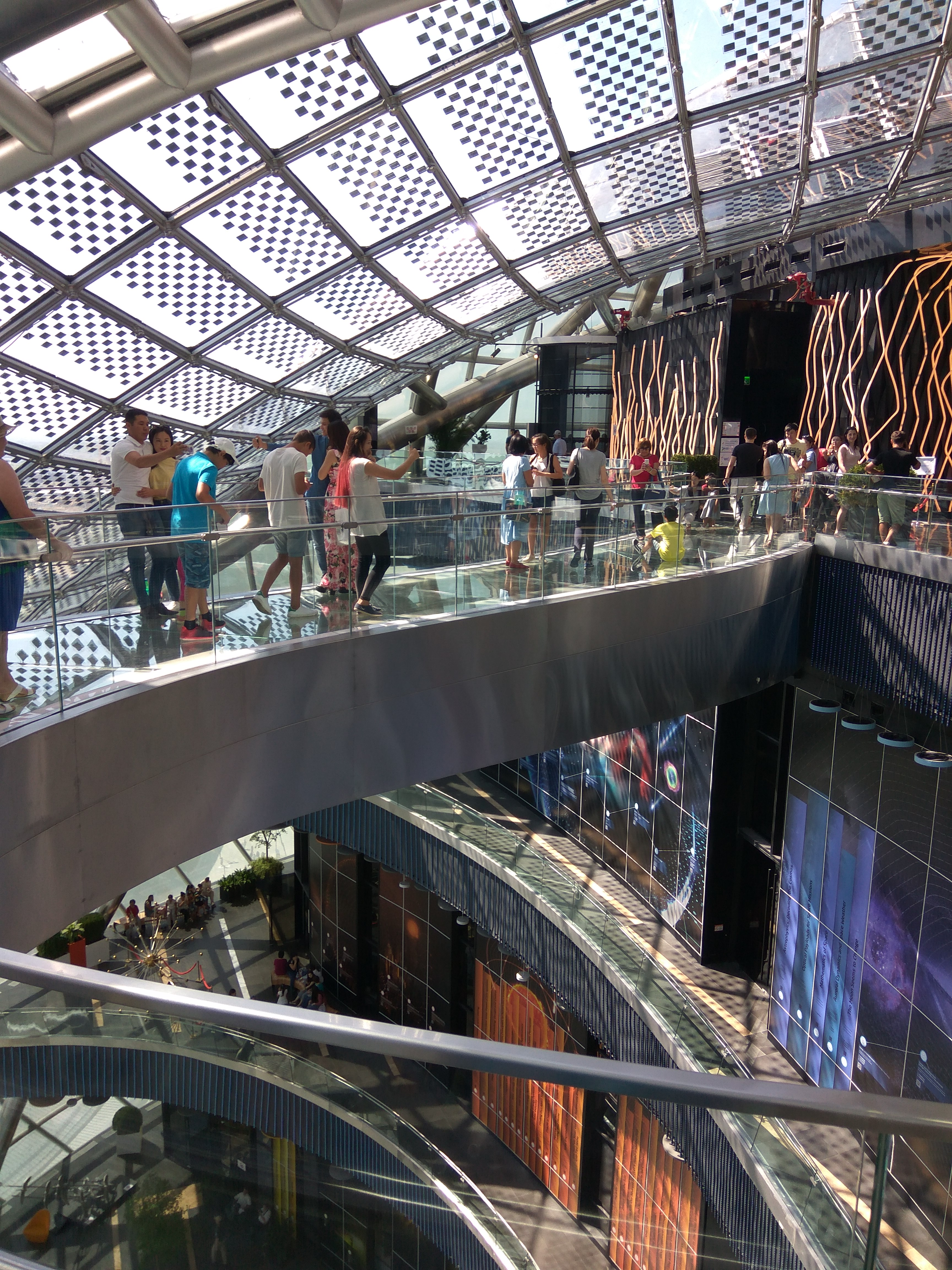
The Nur Alem Pavilion at EXPO 2017 in Astana

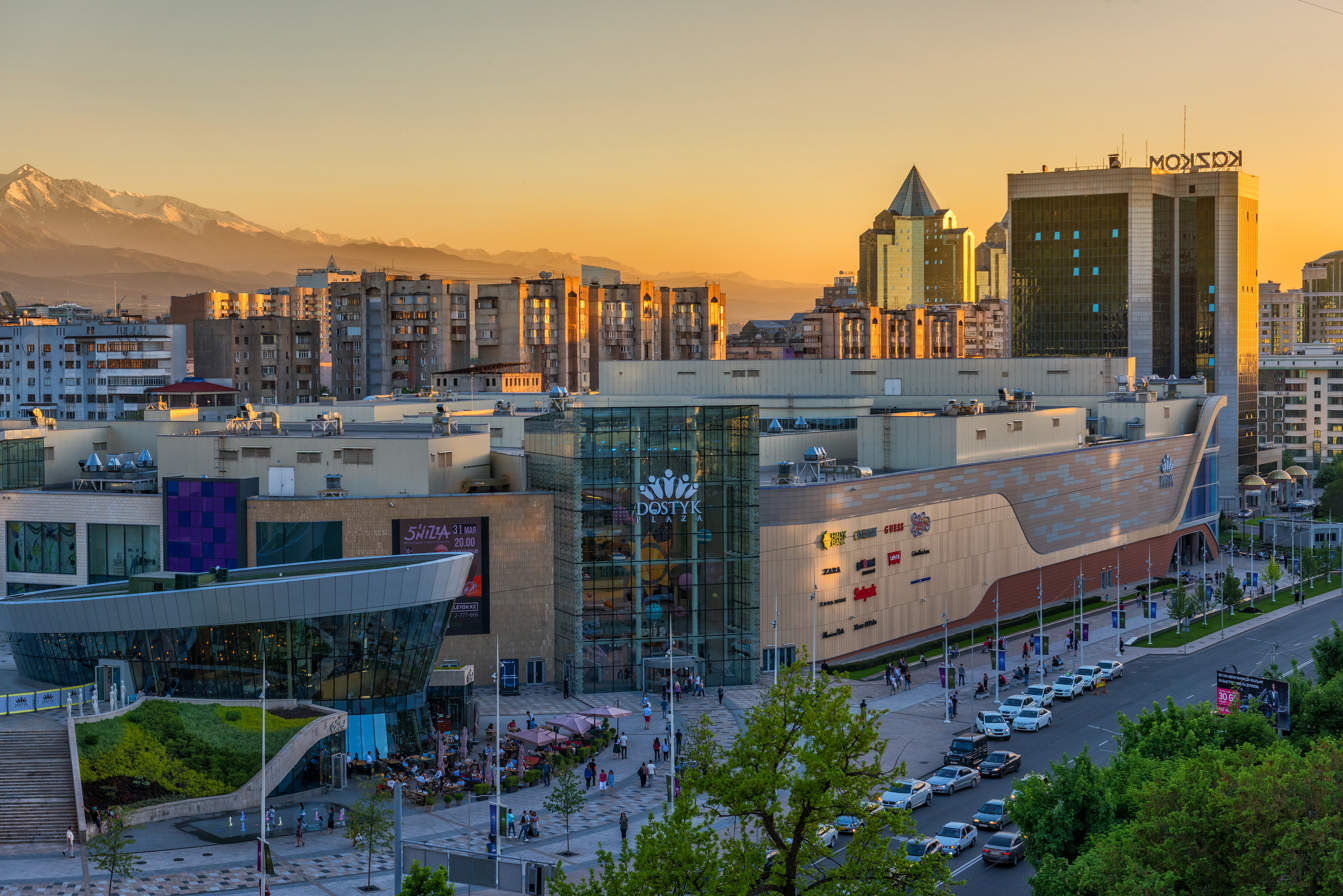
Almaty

Kazakhstan is the ninth-largest country by area and the largest landlocked country in the world. As of 2014 tourism accounted for 0.3% of Kazakhstan's GDP, but the government had plans to increase it to 3% by 2020. According to the World Economic Forum's Travel and Tourism Competitiveness Report of 2017, travel and tourism industry GDP in Kazakhstan was $3.08 billion or only 1.6% of total GDP. The WEF ranked Kazakhstan 80th in its 2019 report.

In 2017 Kazakhstan ranked 43rd in the number of tourist arrivals. In 2014 The Guardian described tourism in Kazakhstan as "hugely underdeveloped," despite the country's mountain, lake, and desert landscapes. Factors hampering an increase in tourism were said to include high prices, "shabby infrastructure," "poor service," and the difficulties of travel in a large underdeveloped country. Even for Kazakhs, going for a holiday abroad may cost only half the price of taking a holiday in Kazakhstan.

The Kazakh government, long characterized as authoritarian with a history of human rights abuses and suppression of political opposition, in 2015 issued a "Tourism Industry Development Plan 2020." It aimed to establish five tourism clusters in Kazakhstan: Astana city, Almaty city, East Kazakhstan, South Kazakhstan, and West Kazakhstan Oblasts. It also sought investment of $4 billion and the creation of 300,000 new jobs in the tourism industry by 2020.

Kazakhstan has offered a permanent visa-free regime for up to 90 days to citizens of Armenia, Azerbaijan, Belarus, Georgia, Moldova, Kyrgyzstan, Mongolia, Russia and Ukraine, and for up to 30 days to citizens of Argentina, Brazil, Ecuador, Serbia, South Korea, Tajikistan, Turkey, UAE and Uzbekistan. It also established a visa-free regime for citizens of 54 countries, including the European Union and OECD member states, the US, Japan, Mexico, Australia and New Zealand.

=== Foreign direct investment ===
Kazakhstan has attracted $330 billion in foreign direct investment (FDI) from more than 120 countries since its independence (1991). In 2015, the US State Department said Kazakhstan was widely considered to have the best investment climate in the region. In 2014, President Nazarbayev signed into law tax concessions to promote foreign direct investment which included a 10-year exemption from corporation tax, an eight-year exemption from property tax, and a 10-year freeze on most other taxes. Other incentives include a refund on capital investments of up to 30% once a production facility is in operation. In 2012, Kazakhstan attracted $14 billion of foreign direct investment inflows into the country at a 7% growth rate. In 2018, $24 billion of FDI was directed into Kazakhstan, a significant increase since 2012.

In 2014 the European Bank of Reconstruction and Development (EBRD) and Kazakhstan created the partnership for Re-Energizing the Reform Process in Kazakhstan to work with international financial institutions to channel US$2.7 billion provided by the Kazakh government into important sectors of Kazakhstan's economy. As of May 2014 Kazakhstan had attracted $190 billion in gross foreign investments since its independence in 1991 and it led the CIS countries in terms of FDI attracted per capita. The OECD 2017 Investment Policy Review noted that "great strides" had been made to open up opportunities to foreign investors and improve policy to attract FDI. China is one of the main economic and trade partners of Kazakhstan. In 2013, China launched the Belt and Road Initiative (BRI) in which Kazakhstan functions as a transit hub.

=== Banking ===
The banking industry of Kazakhstan went through a boom-and-bust cycle in the early 21st century. After several years of rapid expansion in the mid-2000s, the banking industry collapsed in 2008. Several large banking groups, including BTA Bank J.S.C. and Alliance Bank, defaulted soon thereafter. The industry shrank and was restructured, with system-wide loans dropping from 59 percent of GDP in 2007 to 39 percent in 2011. The Kazakh National Bank introduced deposit insurance in a campaign to strengthen the banking sector. Several major foreign banks had branches in Kazakhstan, including RBS, Citibank, and HSBC. Kookmin and UniCredit both entered Kazakhstan's financial services market through acquisitions and stake-building.

=== Economic competitiveness ===
According to the 2010–11 World Economic Forum in Global Competitiveness Report, Kazakhstan was ranked 72nd in the world in economic competitiveness. One year later, the Global Competitiveness Report ranked Kazakhstan 50th in most competitive markets.

In the 2020 Doing Business Report by the World Bank, Kazakhstan ranked 25th globally and as the number one best country globally for protecting minority investors' rights. Kazakhstan achieved its goal of entering the top 50 most competitive countries in 2013 and has maintained its position in the 2014–2015 World Economic Forum Global Competitiveness Report that was published at the beginning of September 2014. Kazakhstan is ahead of other states in the CIS in almost all of the report's pillars of competitiveness, including institutions, infrastructure, macroeconomic environment, higher education and training, goods market efficiency, labour market development, financial market development, technological readiness, market size, business sophistication and innovation, lagging behind only in the category of health and primary education. The Global Competitiveness Index gives a score from 1 to 7 in each of these pillars, and Kazakhstan earned an overall score of 4.4.

=== Science and technology ===
Trends in research expenditure in Central Asia, as a percentage of GDP, 2001–2013. Source: UNESCO Science Report: 2030 (2015), figure 14.3.

Research remains largely concentrated in Kazakhstan's largest city and former capital, Almaty, home to 52% of research personnel. Public research is largely confined to institutes, with universities making only a token contribution. Research institutes receive their funding from national research councils under the umbrella of the Ministry of Education and Science. Their output, however, tends to be disconnected from market needs. In the business sector, few industrial enterprises conduct research themselves.

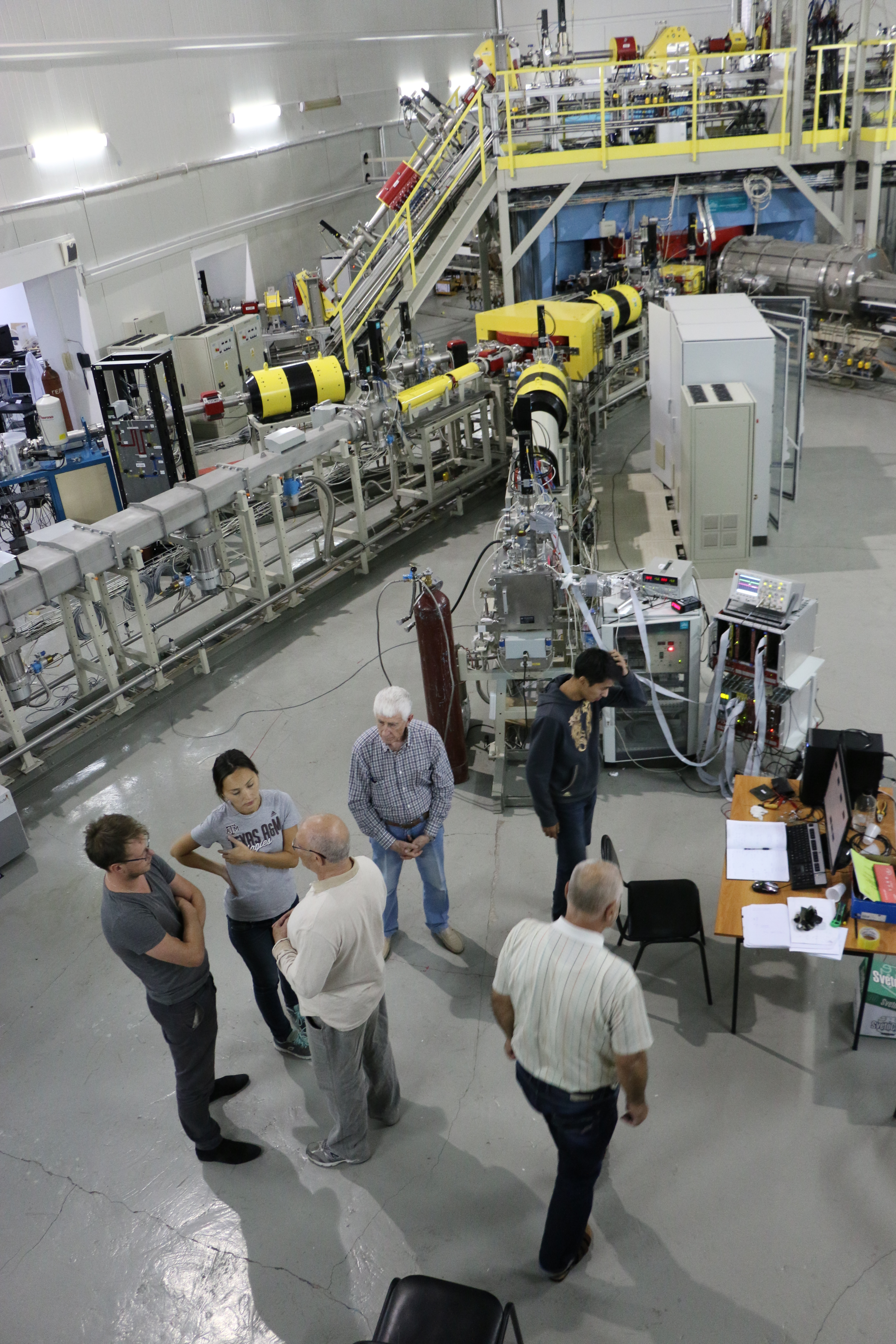
Group of Kazakh physicists in collaboration with Uzbek researchers working at the ion accelerator DC-60

One of the most ambitious targets of the State Programme for Accelerated Industrial and Innovative Development, adopted in 2010, is to raise the country's level of expenditure on research and development to 1% of GDP by 2015. By 2013, this ratio stood at 0.18% of GDP. It will be difficult to reach the target as long as economic growth remains strong. Since 2005, the economy has grown faster (by 6% in 2013) than gross domestic expenditure on research and development, which only progressed from PPP$598 million to PPP$714 million between 2005 and 2013.

Innovation expenditure more than doubled in Kazakhstan between 2010 and 2011, representing KZT 235 billion (c. US$1.6 billion), or around 1.1% of GDP. Some 11% of the total was spent on research and development. This compares with about 40 to 70% of innovation expenditure in developed countries. This augmentation was due to a sharp rise in product design and the introduction of new services and production methods over this period, to the detriment of the acquisition of machinery and equipment, which has traditionally made up the bulk of Kazakhstan's innovation expenditure. Training costs represented just 2% of innovation expenditure, a much lower share than in developed countries. Kazakhstan was ranked 81st in the Global Innovation Index in 2025.

In December 2012 President Nursultan Nazarbayev announced the Kazakhstan 2050 Strategy with the slogan "Strong Business, Strong State." This pragmatic strategy proposes sweeping socio-economic and political reforms to hoist Kazakhstan among the top 30 economies by 2050. In this document, Kazakhstan gives itself 15 years to evolve into a knowledge economy. New sectors are to be created during each five-year plan. The first of these, covering the years 2010–2014, focused on developing industrial capacity in car manufacturing, aircraft engineering and the production of locomotives, passenger and cargo railroad cars. During the second five-year plan to 2019, the goal is to develop export markets for these products. To enable Kazakhstan to enter the world market of geological exploration, the country intends to increase the efficiency of traditional extractive sectors such as oil and gas. It also intends to develop rare earth metals, given their importance for electronics, laser technology, communication and medical equipment. The second five-year plan coincides with the development of the Business 2020 roadmap for small and medium-sized enterprises (SMEs), which makes provision for the allocation of grants to SMEs in the regions and for microcredit. The government and the National Chamber of Entrepreneurs also plan to develop an effective mechanism to help start-ups.

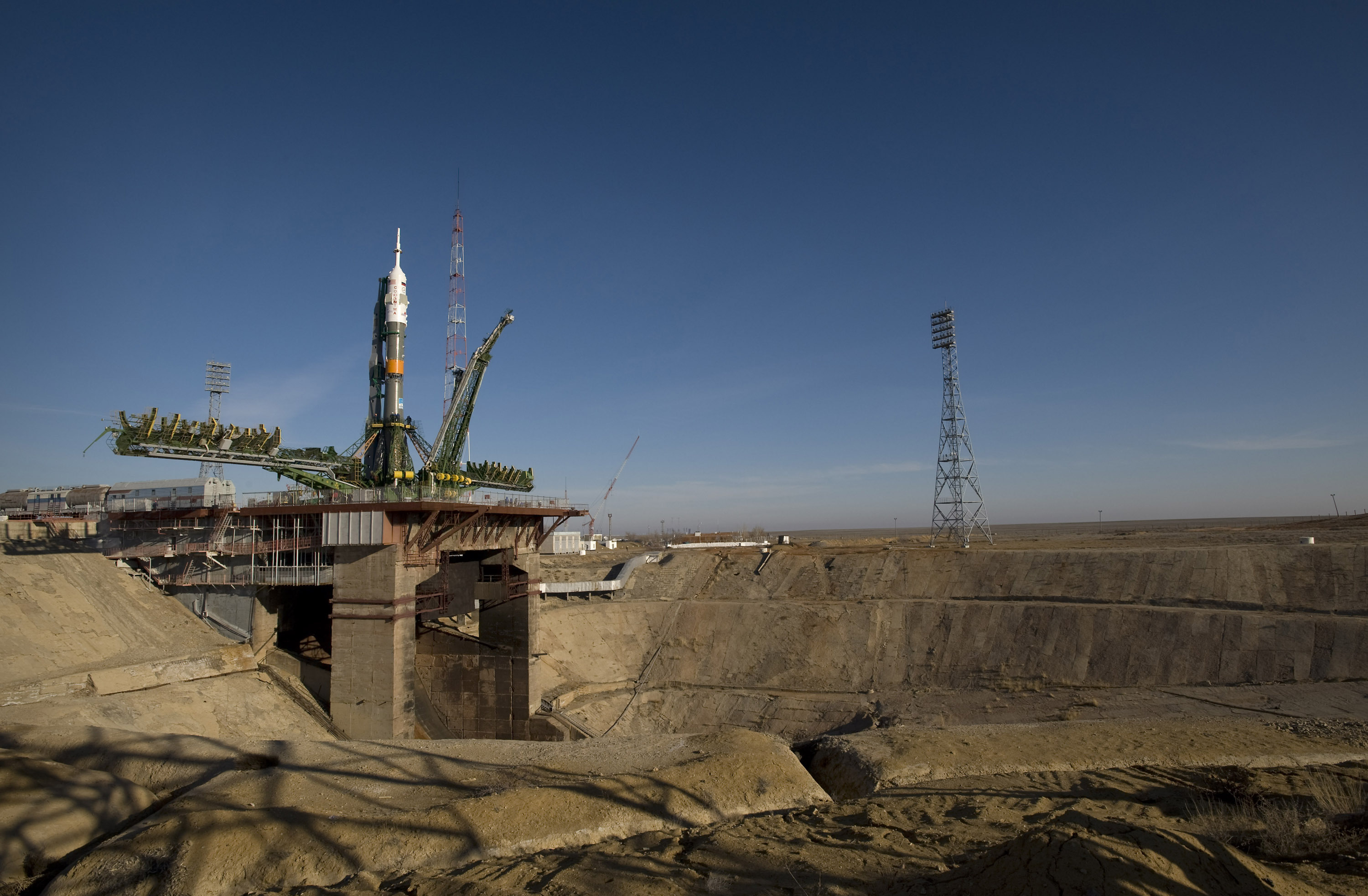
Baikonur Cosmodrome is the world's oldest and largest operational spaceport.

During the subsequent five-year plans to 2050, new industries will be established in fields such as mobile, multimedia, nano- and space technologies, robotics, genetic engineering and alternative energy. Food processing enterprises will be developed with an eye to turning the country into a major regional exporter of beef, dairy, and other agricultural products. Low-return, water-intensive crop varieties will be replaced with vegetable, oil and fodder products. As part of the shift to a "green economy" by 2030, 15% of acreage will be cultivated with water-saving technologies. Experimental agrarian and innovational clusters will be established and drought-resistant genetically modified crops developed.

The Kazakhstan 2050 Strategy fixes a target of devoting 3% of GDP to research and development by 2050 to allow for the development of new high-tech sectors.

The Digital Kazakhstan program was launched in 2018 to boost the country's economic growth through the implementation of digital technologies. Kazakhstan's digitization efforts generated 800 billion tenges (US$1.97 billion) in two years. The program helped create 120,000 jobs and attracted 32.8 billion tenges (US$80.7 million) of investment into the country.

Around 82% of all public services became automated as part of the Digital Kazakhstan program.

== Demographics ==
Population pyramid, 2023

Kazakhstan had an estimated population of 20.8 million as of 2025. According to official statistics, the country's population surpassed 20 million in September 2024, compared to 17,280,000 a decade earlier. This reflects significant growth since independence in 1991, when the population was 16.4 million, before subsequently declining to 14.8 million by 2001, due mostly to emigration by ethnic Russians.

In contrast to most post-Soviet states, Kazakhstan has maintained replacement rate fertility since independence, with a total fertility rate of 2.53 in 2025. Consequently, the country has a young population, with 29% of Kazakhstanis being 14 years old and younger, and only 9% aged 65 and older.

In the 2024 Global Hunger Index (GHI), Kazakhstan ranks 25th out of 127 countries with sufficient data. Kazakhstan's GHI score is 5.3, which indicates a low level of hunger.

=== Urban centres ===
Largest cities or towns in Kazakhstan
Rank	Name	Region	Pop.
1	Almaty	Almaty	1,854,656
2	Astana	Astana	1,078,384
3	Şymkent	Shymkent	1,009,086
4	Qarağandy	Qarağandy	497,712
5	Aqtobe	Aqtobe	487,994
6	Taraz	Jambyl	357,791
7	Pavlodar	Pavlodar	333,989
8	Öskemen	East Kazakhstan	331,614
9	Semey	Abai	323,138
10	Atyrau	Atyrau	269,720

=== Ethnic groups ===
Central Asian ethnolinguistic patchwork, 1992

As of 2026 ethnic Kazakhs are 71.5% of the population and ethnic Russians are 14.4%. The ethnic Russian population has significantly declined since the breakup of the Soviet Union. Other groups include Tatars (1.1%), Ukrainians (1.8%), Uzbeks (3.4%), Germans (1.1%), Uyghurs (1.5%), Azerbaijanis, Dungans, Turks, Koreans, Poles, and Lithuanians. Some minorities such as Ukrainians, Koreans, Volga Germans, Chechens, Meskhetian Turks, and Russian political opponents of the regime, had been deported to Kazakhstan in the 1930s and 1940s by Josef Stalin. Some of the largest Soviet labour camps (Gulag) existed in the country.

Significant Russian immigration was also connected with the Virgin Lands Campaign and Soviet space program during the Khrushchev era. In 1989, ethnic Russians were 37.8% of the population and Kazakhs held a majority in only 7 of the 20 regions of the country. Before 1991 there were about one million Germans in Kazakhstan, mostly descendants of the Volga Germans deported to Kazakhstan during World War II. After the dissolution of the Soviet Union, most of them emigrated to Germany. Most members of the smaller Pontian Greek minority have emigrated to Greece. In the late 1930s thousands of Koreans in the Soviet Union were deported to Central Asia. These people are now known as Koryo-saram.

The 1990s were marked by the emigration of many of the country's Russians, Ukrainians and Volga Germans, a process that began in the 1970s. This has made indigenous Kazakhs the largest ethnic group. Additional factors in the increase in the Kazakhstani population are higher birthrates and immigration of ethnic Kazakhs from China, Mongolia, and Russia.

As of 2026, 63.6% of the population lives in urban areas.

=== Languages ===
Kazakhstan is officially a bilingual country. Kazakh (part of the Kipchak sub-branch of the Turkic languages) was proficiently spoken by 80.1% of the population according to 2021 census, and has the status of "state language". Russian, on the other hand, was spoken by 83.7% as of 2021. It has equal status to Kazakh as an "official language", and is used routinely in business, government, and inter-ethnic communication. However, only 63.4% of ethnic Kazakhs and 49.3% of the country's population are daily speakers of the Kazakh language, according to the same census.

The government announced in January 2015 that the Latin alphabet would replace Cyrillic as the writing system for the Kazakh language by 2025. Other minority languages spoken in Kazakhstan include Uzbek, Ukrainian, Uyghur, Kyrgyz, Tatar, and German. English, as well as Turkish, have gained popularity among younger people since the collapse of the Soviet Union. Education across Kazakhstan is conducted in either Kazakh, Russian, or both. In Nazarbayev's resignation speech of 2019, he projected that the people of Kazakhstan in the future will speak three languages (Kazakh, Russian and English).

=== Religion ===
Religion in Kazakhstan (2021 census)
Islam	69.3%
Christianity	17.2%
No response	11.01%
Atheism	2.25%
Other religions	0.2%

According to the 2021 census, 69.3% of the population is Muslim, 17.2% are Christian, 0.2% follow other religions (mostly Buddhist and Jewish), 11.01% chose not to answer, and 2.25% identify as atheist.

Kazakhstan is a secular state whose constitution guarantees religious freedoms. Article 39 of the constitution states: "Human rights and freedoms shall not be restricted in any way." Article 14 prohibits "discrimination on religious basis" and Article 19 ensures that everyone has the "right to determine and indicate or not to indicate his/her ethnic, party and religious affiliation." The Constitutional Council affirmed these rights in a 2009 declaration, which stated that a proposed law limiting the rights of certain individuals to practice their religion was declared unconstitutional.

Islam is the largest religion in Kazakhstan, followed by Eastern Orthodox Christianity. After decades of religious suppression by the Soviet Union, the coming of independence witnessed a surge in the expression of ethnic identity, partly through religion. The free practice of religious beliefs and the establishment of full freedom of religion led to an increase in religious activity. Hundreds of mosques, churches, and other religious structures were built in the span of a few years, with the number of religious associations rising from 670 in 1990 to 4,170 today.

Some figures show that non-denominational Muslims form the majority, while others indicate that most Muslims in the country are Sunnis following the Hanafi school. These include ethnic Kazakhs, who constitute about 7% of the population, as well as ethnic Uzbeks, Uighurs, and Tatars. Less than 1% are part of the Sunni Shafi`i school (primarily Chechens). There are also some Ahmadi Muslims. There are a total of 2,300 mosques, all of them are affiliated with the "Spiritual Association of Muslims of Kazakhstan", headed by a supreme mufti, who since 2020 is Nauryzbay Taganuly Otpenov. Unaffiliated mosques are forcefully closed. Eid al-Adha is recognized as a national holiday. One quarter of the population is Russian Orthodox, including ethnic Russians, Ukrainians and Belarusians. Other Christian groups include Roman Catholics, Greek Catholics, and Protestants. There are a total of 258 Orthodox churches, 93 Catholic churches (9 Greek Catholic), and over 500 Protestant churches and prayer houses. The Russian Orthodox Christmas is recognized as a national holiday in Kazakhstan. Other religious groups include Judaism, the Baháʼí Faith, Hinduism, Buddhism, and the Church of Jesus Christ of Latter-day Saints.

According to the 2009 Census data, there are few Christians outside the Russian and Germanic ethnic groups.

The Astana Grand Mosque in the capital Astana. Islam is the majority religion in the country.

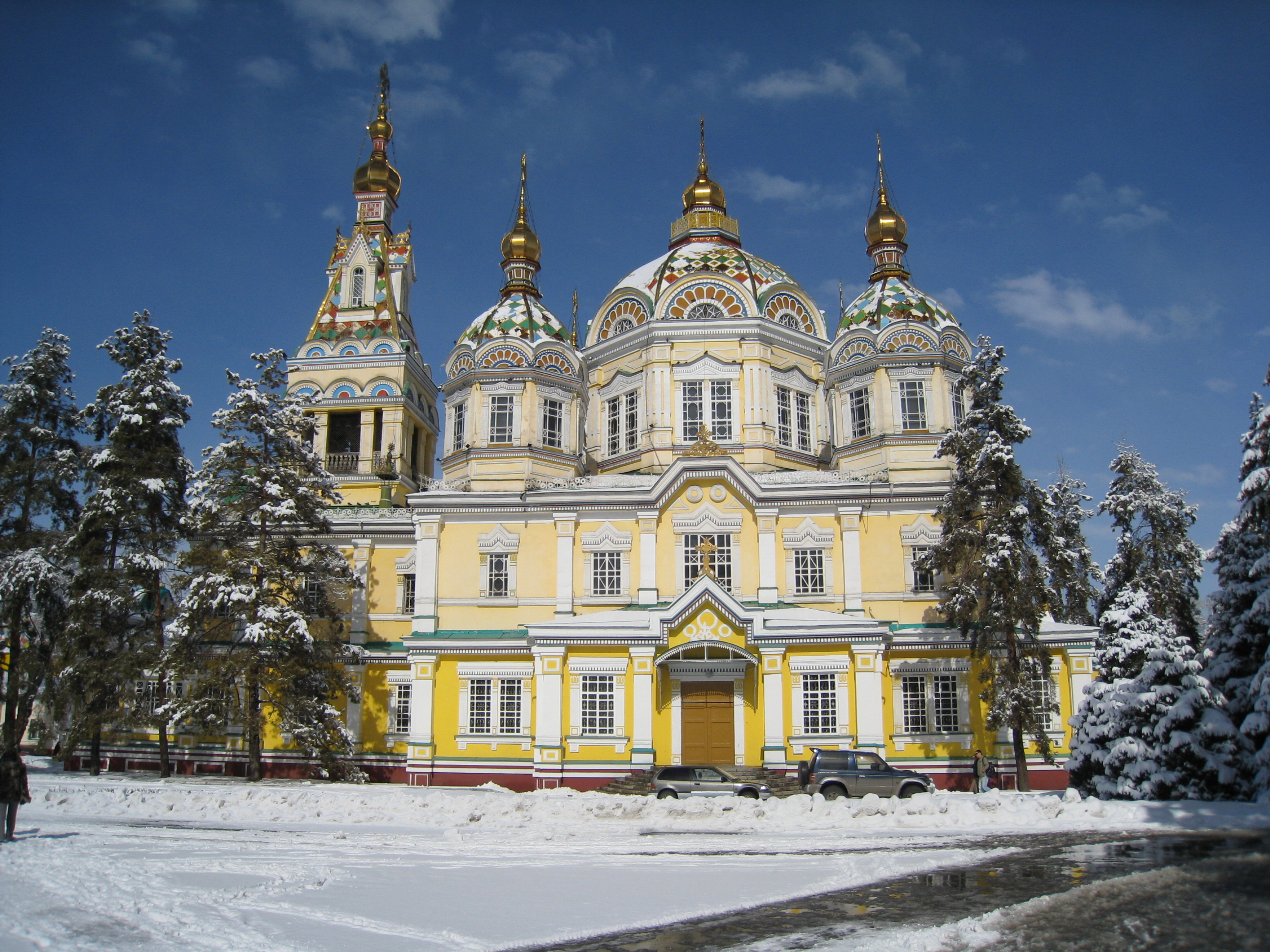
Ascension Cathedral in Almaty

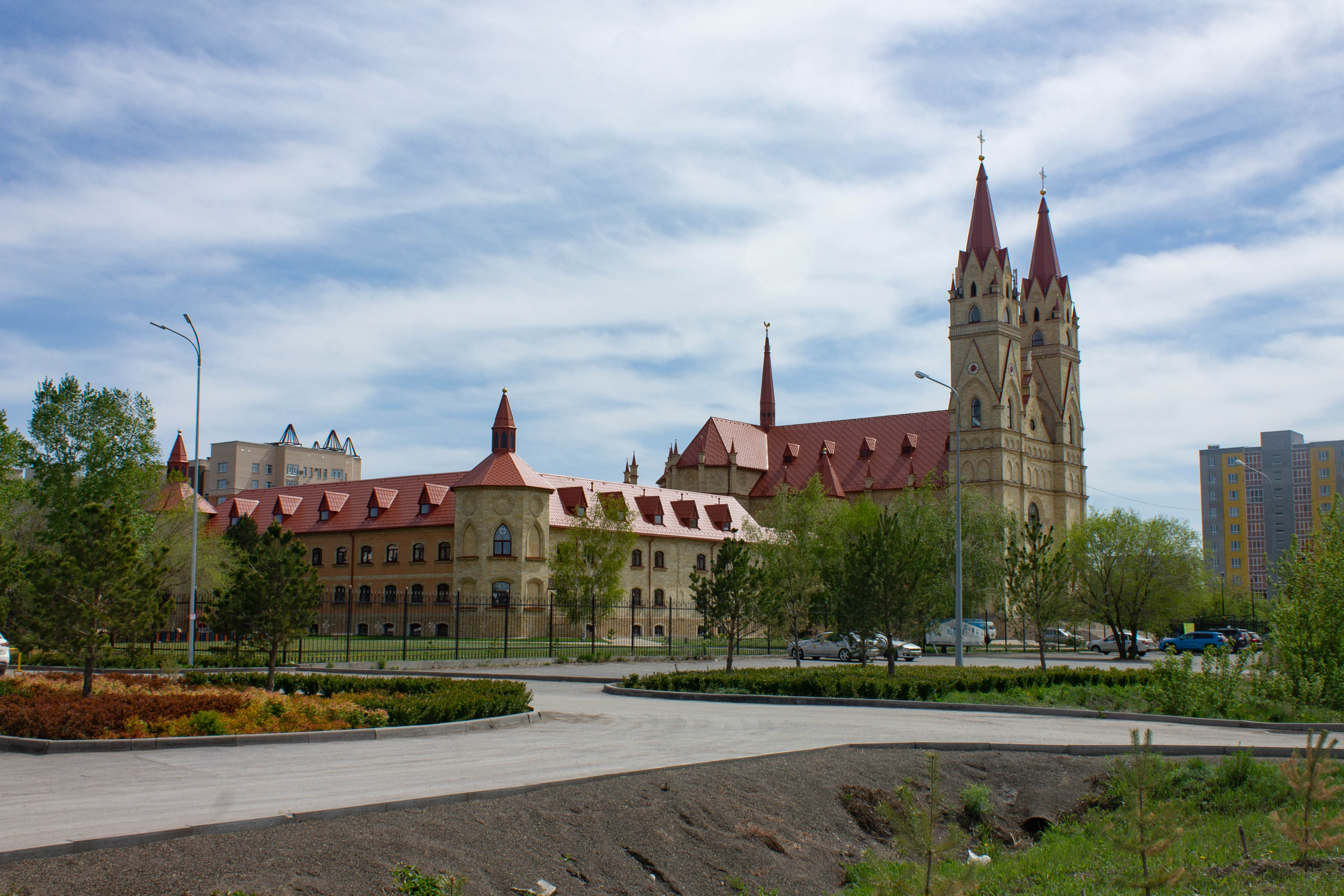
Cathedral of Our Lady of Fatima is the biggest Catholic church in Central Asia.

=== Education ===
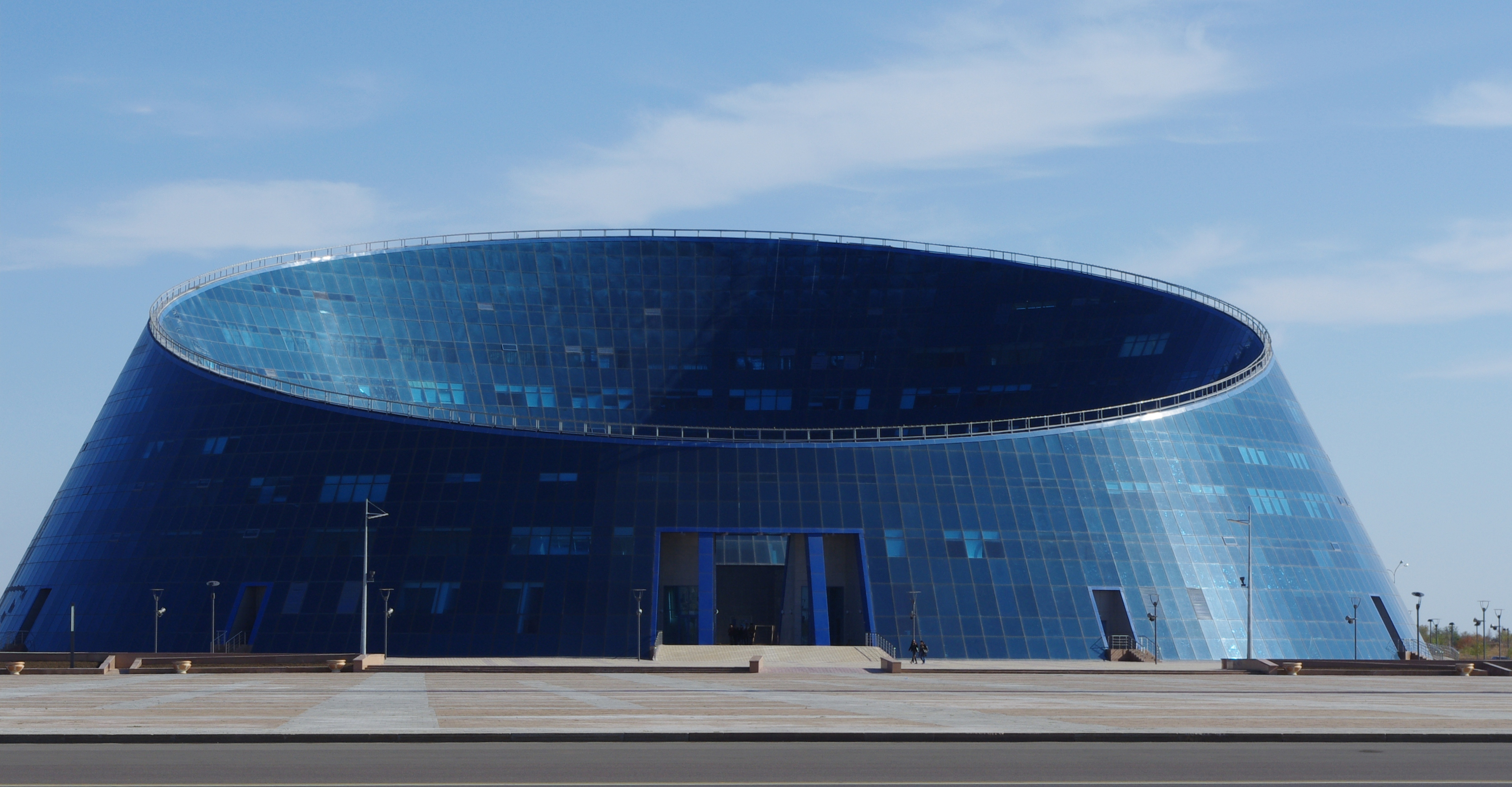
Kazakh National University of Arts

Education is universal and mandatory through to the secondary level and the adult literacy rate is 99.5%. On average, these statistics are equal for both women and men in Kazakhstan.

Education consists of three main phases: primary education (forms 1–4), basic general education (forms 5–9) and senior level education (forms 10–11 or 12), divided into continued general education and vocational education. Vocational Education usually lasts three or four years. (Primary education is preceded by one year of pre-school education.) These levels can be followed in one institution or in different ones (e.g., primary school, then secondary school). Recently, several secondary schools, specialized schools, magnet schools, gymnasiums, lyceums and linguistic and technical gymnasiums have been founded. Secondary professional education is offered in special professional or technical schools, lyceums or colleges and vocational schools.

At present, there are universities, academies and institutes, conservatories, higher schools and higher colleges. There are three main levels: basic higher education that provides the fundamentals of the chosen field of study and leads to the award of the bachelor's degree; specialized higher education after which students are awarded the Specialist's Diploma; and scientific-pedagogical higher education, which leads to the master's degree. Postgraduate education leads to the Kandidat Nauk ("Candidate of Sciences") and the Doctor of Sciences (PhD). With the adoption of the Laws on Education and on Higher Education, a private sector has been established and several private institutions have been licensed.

Over 2,500 students in Kazakhstan have applied for student loans totalling about $9 million. The largest number of student loans comes from Almaty, Astana and Kyzylorda.

The training and skills development programs in Kazakhstan are also supported by international organizations. For example, on 30 March 2015, the World Banks' Group of Executive Directors approved a $100 million loan for the Skills and Job project in Kazakhstan. The project aims to provide training to unemployed, unproductively self-employed, and employees in need of training.

== Culture ==
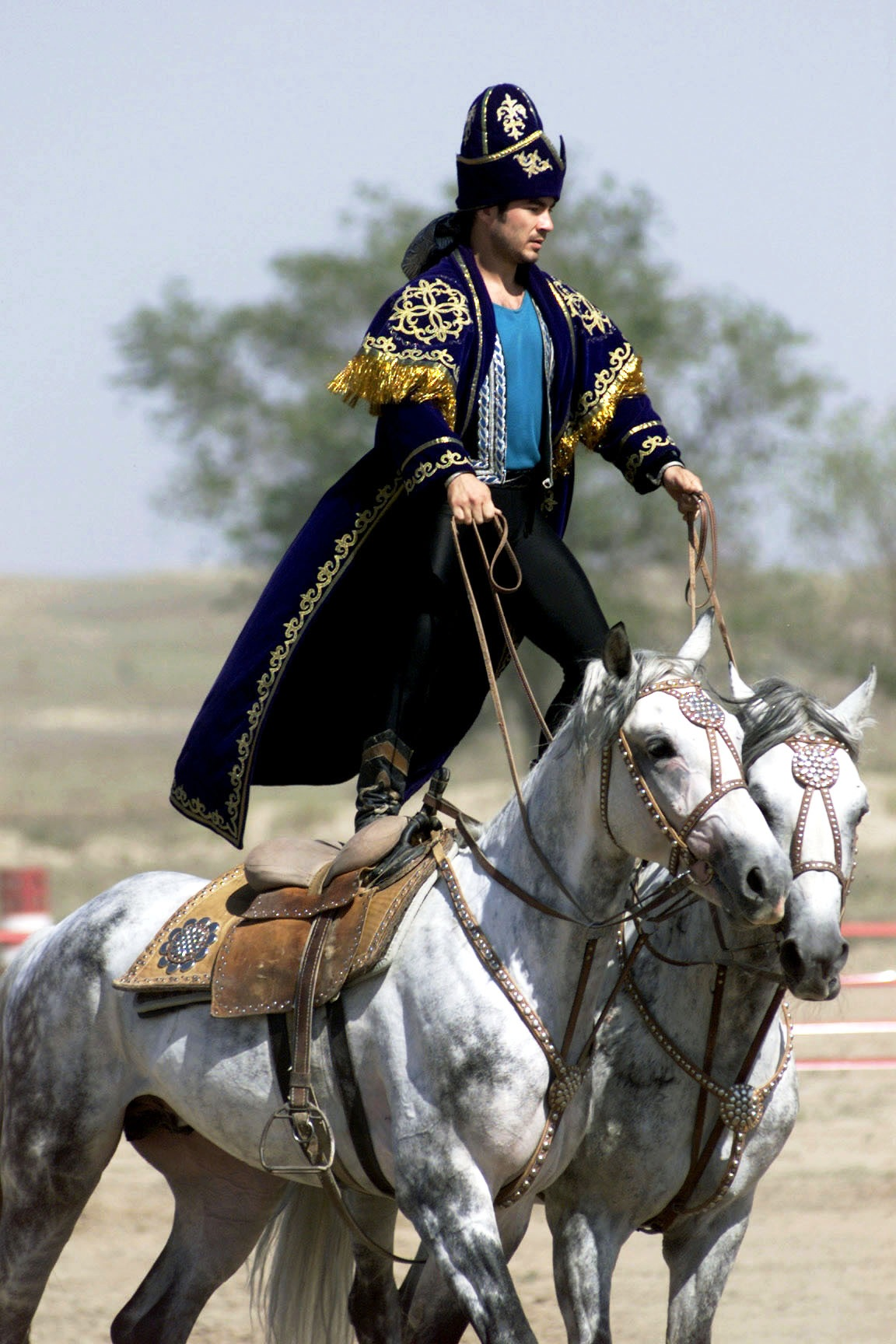
A Kazakhstani performer demonstrates the long equestrian heritage as part of the gala concert during the opening ceremonies of the Central Asian Peacekeeping Battalion.

Before the Russian colonization, the Kazakhs had a highly developed culture based on their nomadic pastoral economy. Islam was introduced into the region with the arrival of the Arabs in the 8th century. It initially took hold in the southern parts of Turkestan and spread northward. The Samanids helped the religion take root through zealous missionary work. The Golden Horde further propagated Islam amongst the tribes in the region during the 14th century.

Kazakhstan is home to a large number of prominent contributors to literature, science and philosophy: Abay Qunanbayuli, Mukhtar Auezov, Gabit Musirepov, Kanysh Satpayev, Mukhtar Shakhanov, Saken Seyfullin, Jambyl Jabayev, among many others.

Tourism is a rapidly growing industry in Kazakhstan and it is joining the international tourism network. In 2010, Kazakhstan joined The Region Initiative (TRI), which is a Tri-regional Umbrella of Tourism-related organizations. TRI is functioning as a link between three regions: South Asia, Central Asia, and Eastern Europe. Armenia, Bangladesh, Georgia, Kazakhstan, Kyrgyzstan, India, Nepal, Pakistan, Russia, Sri Lanka, Tajikistan, Turkey, and Ukraine are now partners, and Kazakhstan is linked with other South Asian, Eastern European, and Central Asian countries in the tourism market.

=== Fine arts ===
In Kazakhstan, the fine arts, in the classical sense, have their origins in the second half of the 19th century and the beginning of the 20th century. It was largely influenced by Russian artists, such as Vasily Vereshchagin and Nikolai Khludov, who traveled intensively in Central Asia. Khludov had a particular influence on the development of the local school of painting, becoming the teacher of many local artists. The most famous of these is Abilkhan Kasteyev, after whom the State Museum of Art of Kazakhstan was renamed in 1984.

The Kazakh school of fine arts was fully formed by the 1940s and flourished in the 1950s. Local painters, graphic artists and sculptors, trained under the unified Soviet system of artist education, began active work, often using national motifs in their art. The painters O. Tansykbaev, J. Shardenov, K. Telzhanov, and S. Aitbaev, graphic artists E. Sidorkina and A. Duzelkhanov, and sculptors H. Nauryzbaeva and E. Sergebaeva are today counted among the key figures of Kazakhstani art.

=== Literature ===
Kazakh literature is defined as "the body of literature, both oral and written, produced in the Kazakh language by the Kazakh people of Central Asia". Kazakh literature expands from the modern territory of Kazakhstan, including the era of Kazakh Soviet Socialist Republic, Kazakh recognized territory under the Russian Empire and the Kazakh Khanate. There is some overlap with several complementary themes, including the literature of Turkic tribes that inhabited Kazakhstan over the course of its history and literature written by ethnic Kazakhs.

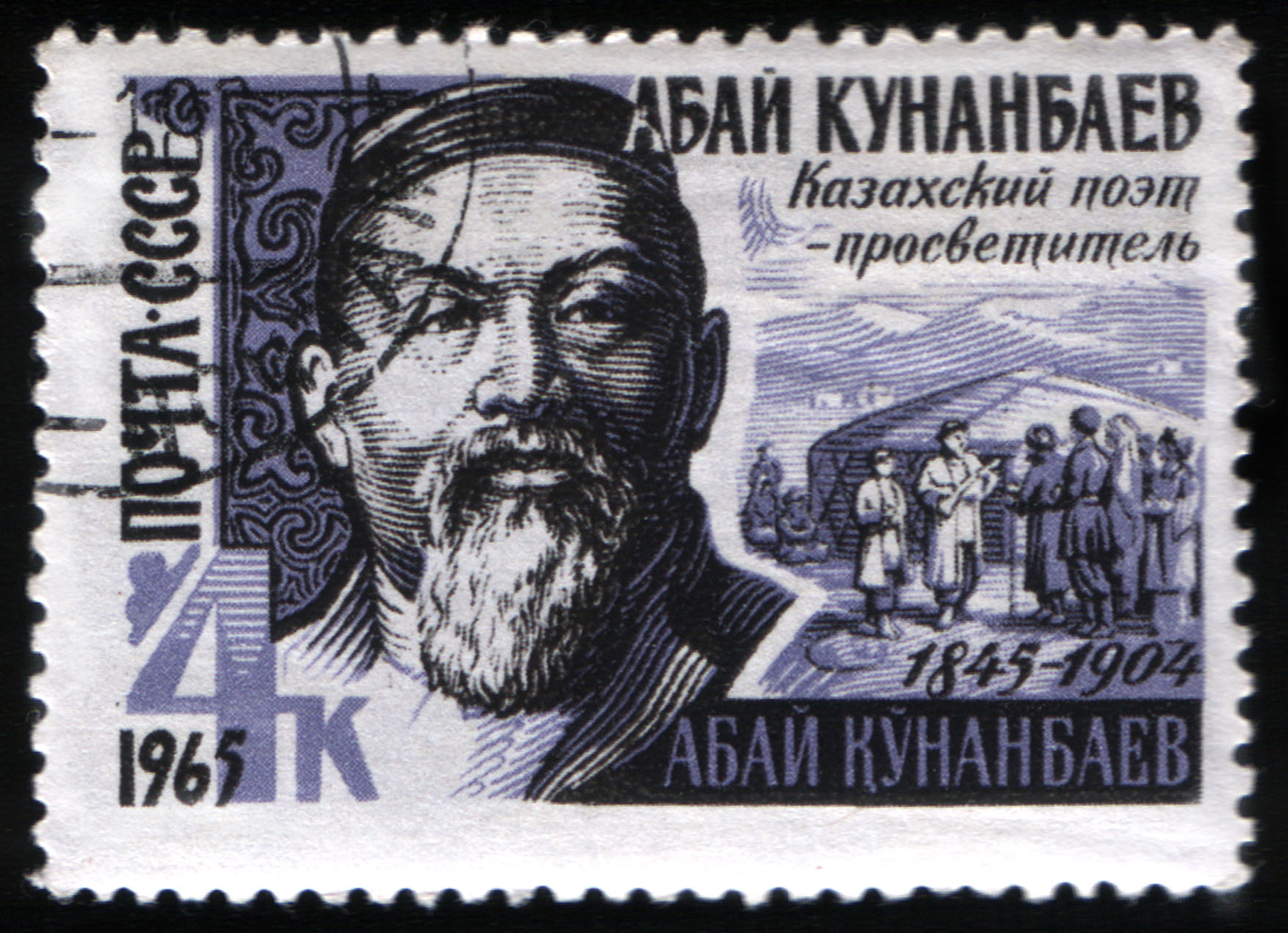
1965 Soviet stamp honouring Kazakh essayist and poet Abai Qunanbaiuly

According to Chinese written sources from the 6th–8th centuries CE, the Turkic tribes of Kazakhstan had an oral poetry tradition. These came from earlier periods and were primarily transmitted by bards: professional storytellers and musical performers. Traces of this tradition are shown on Orkhon script stone carvings dated 5th–7th centuries CE that describe rule of Kultegin and Bilge, two early Turkic rulers ("kagans"). Amongst the Kazakhs, the bard was a primarily, though not exclusively, male profession. Since at least the 17th century, Kazakh bards could be divided into two main categories: the jıraws (jiraus, jyraus), who passed on the works of others, usually not creating and adding their own original work; and the aqyns (akyns), who improvised or created their own poems, stories or songs. There were several types of works, such as didactic termes, elegiac tolgaws, and epic jırs. Although the origins of such tales are often unknown, most of them were associated with bards of the recent or more distant past, who supposedly created them or passed them on, by the time most Kazakh poetry and prose was first written down in the second half of the 19th century. There are clear stylistic differences between works first created in the 19th century, and works dating from earlier periods but not documented before the 19th century, such as those attributed to such 16th- and 17th-century bards as Er Shoban and Dosmombet Jıraw (also known as Dospambet Jyrau; he appeared to have been literate, and reportedly visited Constantinople), and even to such 15th-century bards as Shalkiz and Asan Qayghı.

Other notable bards include Kaztugan Jyrau, Jiembet Jyrau, Axtamberdy Jyrau, and Buxar Jyrau Kalkamanuly, who was an advisor to Ablai Khan, and whose works have been preserved by Mäšhür Jüsip Köpeev. Er Targhın and Alpamıs are two of the most famous examples of Kazakh literature to be recorded in the 19th century. The Book of Dede Korkut and Oguz Name (a story of an ancient Turkic king Oghuz Khan) are the most well-known Turkic heroic legends. Initially created around the 9th century CE, they were passed on through generations in oral form. The legendary tales were recorded by Turkish authors in 14–16th centuries C.E.

The preeminent role in the development of modern literary Kazakh belongs to Abai Qunanbaiuly (Kazakh: Абай Құнанбайұлы, sometimes Russified to Abay Kunanbayev, Абай Кунанбаев) (1845–1904), whose writings did much to preserve Kazakh folk culture. Abai's major work is The Book of Words (Kazakh: қара сөздері, Qara sözderi), a philosophical treatise and collection of poems where he criticizes Russian colonial policies and encourages other Kazakhs to embrace education and literacy. The literary magazines Ay Qap (published between 1911 and 1915 in Arabic script) and Qazaq (published between 1913 and 1918) played an important role in the development of the intellectual and political life among early 20th-century Kazakhs.

=== Music ===
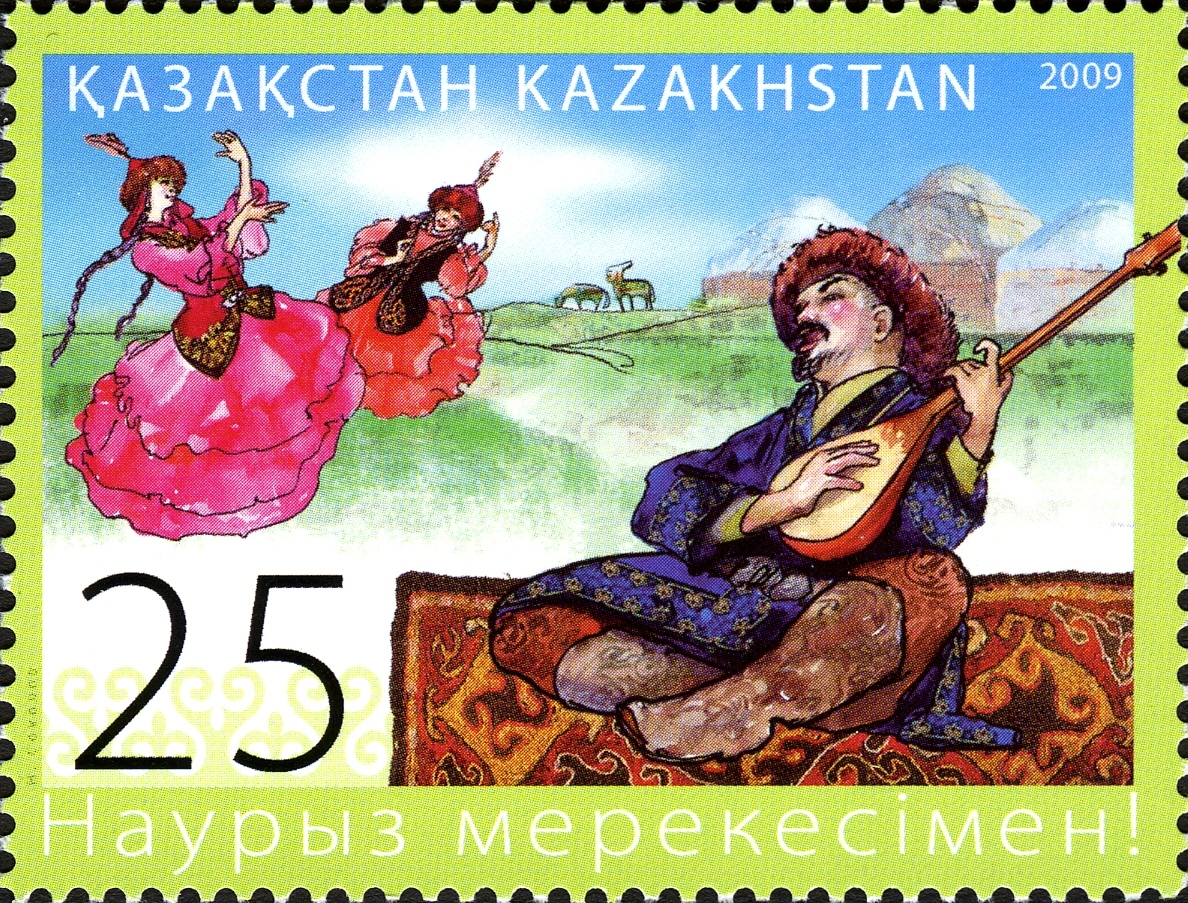
Nowruz on stamp of Kazakhstan

The modern state of Kazakhstan is home to the Kazakh State Kurmangazy Orchestra of Folk Instruments, the Kazakh State Philharmonic Orchestra, the Kazakh National Opera and the Kazakh State Chamber Orchestra. The folk instrument orchestra was named after Kurmangazy Sagyrbayuly, a famous composer and dombra player from the 19th century. The Musical-Dramatic Training College, founded in 1931, was the first institute of higher education for music. Two years later, the Orchestra of Kazakh Folk Musical Instruments was formed. The Foundation Asyl Mura is archiving and publishing historical recordings of great samples of Kazakh music both traditional and classical. The leading conservatoire is in Almaty, the Qurmanghazy Conservatoire. It competes with the national conservatoire in Astana, Kazakhstan's capital.

When referring to traditional Kazakh music, authentic folklore must be separated from "folklorism". The latter denotes music executed by academically trained performers who aim at preserving the traditional music for future generations. As far as can be reconstructed, the music of Kazakhstan from the period before a strong Russian influence consists of instrumental music and vocal music. Instrumental music, with the pieces ("Küy") being performed by soloists. Text is often seen in the background (or "program") for the music, as many Küy titles refer to stories. Vocal music, either as part of a ceremony such as a wedding (mainly performed by women), or as part of a feast. Here we might divide into subgenres: epic singing, containing not only historical facts, but also the tribe's genealogy, love songs, and didactic verses; and, as a special form, the composition of two or more singers in public (Aitys), of dialogue character and usually unexpectedly frank in content.

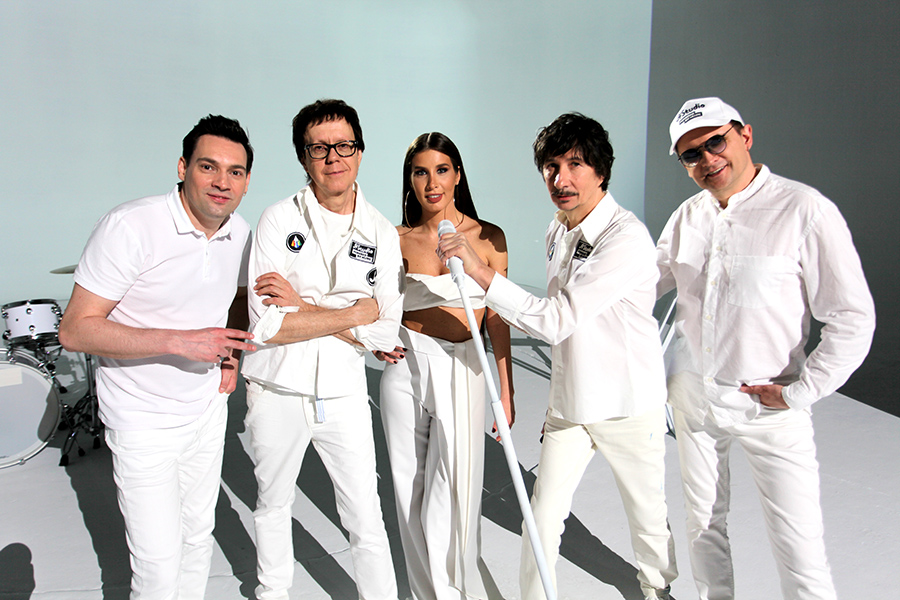
A-Studio was created in 1982 in Almaty, then called Alma-Ata, hence called "Alma-Ata Studio".

Russian influence on music in Kazakhstan developed in two main ways: through the introduction of academic institutions such as concert halls, opera stages, and conservatories, and through the incorporation of Kazakh traditional music into these structures. Under the Russian Empire and later the Soviet Union, Kazakh folk and classical traditions became increasingly connected with ethnic Russian music and Western European music. From the 19th century, Kazakh folk music was collected and studied by ethnographic researchers and transcribed into linear notation, while some composers adapted Kazakh folk songs to Russian-style European classical music. Kazakh musicians did not begin writing their own music in notation until 1931. Under the Soviet Union, Kazakh folk culture was promoted in a controlled form, incorporating traditional music into Soviet musical institutions. In 1920, Aleksandr Zatayevich created art music based on Kazakh folk melodies, while from 1928 he adapted traditional instruments for Russian-style ensembles by increasing their number of frets and strings. By the 1930s, these orchestral styles had become the official form of Kazakh musical performance, transforming folk music into a patriotic and socialist cultural practice.

=== Film ===
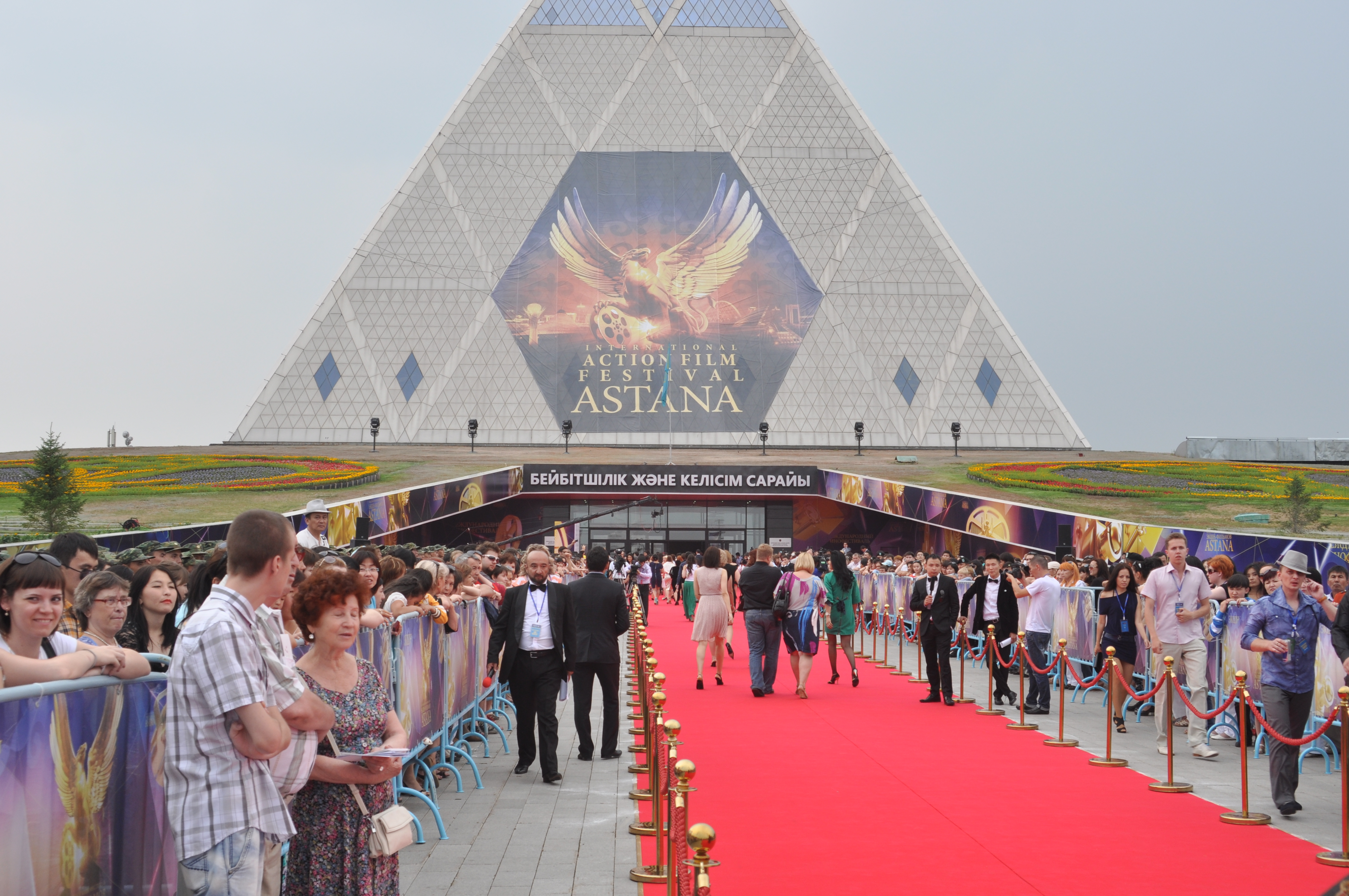
International Astana Action Film Festival, 2010

Kazakhstan's film industry is run through the state-owned Kazakhfilm studios based in Almaty. The studio has produced movies such as Myn Bala, Harmony Lessons, and Shal. Kazakhstan is the host of the International Astana Action Film Festival and the Eurasia International Film Festival held annually. Hollywood director Timur Bekmambetov is from Kazakhstan and has become active in bridging Hollywood to the Kazakhstan film industry.

Kazakhstan journalist Artur Platonov won Best Script for his documentary "Sold Souls" about Kazakhstan's contribution to the struggle against terrorism at the 2013 Cannes Corporate Media and TV Awards.

Serik Aprymov's Little Brother (Bauyr) won at the Central and Eastern Europe Film Festival goEast from the German Federal Foreign Office.

=== Media ===
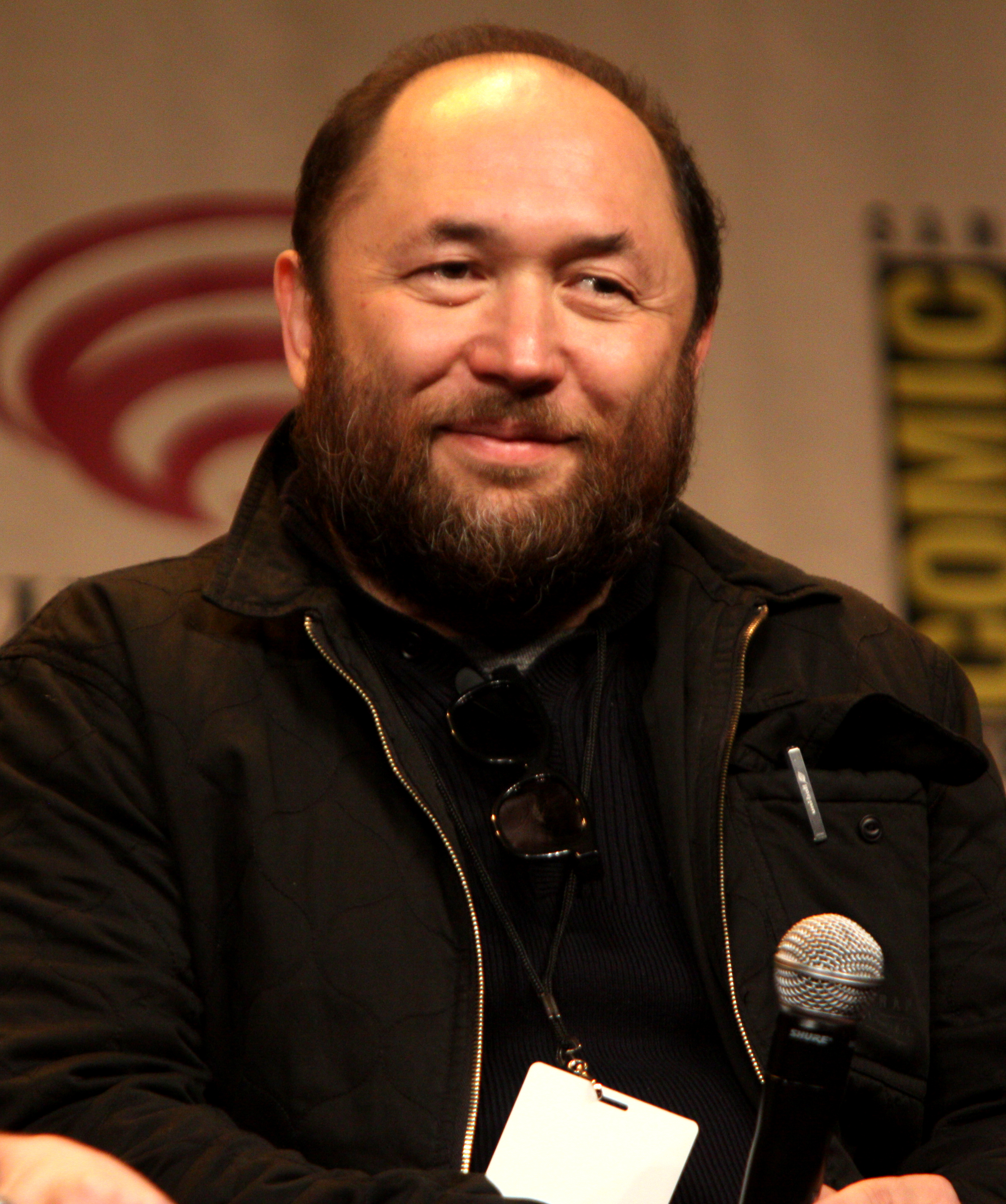
Timur Bekmambetov, a popular Kazakh film director

Kazakhstan was ranked 161 out of 180 countries on the Reporters Without Borders World Press Freedom Index in 2014. A mid-March 2002 court order, with the government as a plaintiff, stated that Respublika were to stop printing for three months. The order was evaded by printing under other titles, such as Not That Respublika. In early 2014, a court also issued a cease publication order to the small-circulation Assandi-Times newspaper, saying it was a part of the Respublika group. Human Rights Watch said: "this absurd case displays the lengths to which Kazakh authorities are willing to go to bully critical media into silence." Mass media regulations and laws against defamation, misinformation and hate speech restrict the freedom of speech.

With support from the US Department of State's Bureau for Democracy, Human Rights and Labor (DRL), the American Bar Association Rule of Law Initiative opened a media support centre in Almaty to assist press outlets in Kazakhstan.

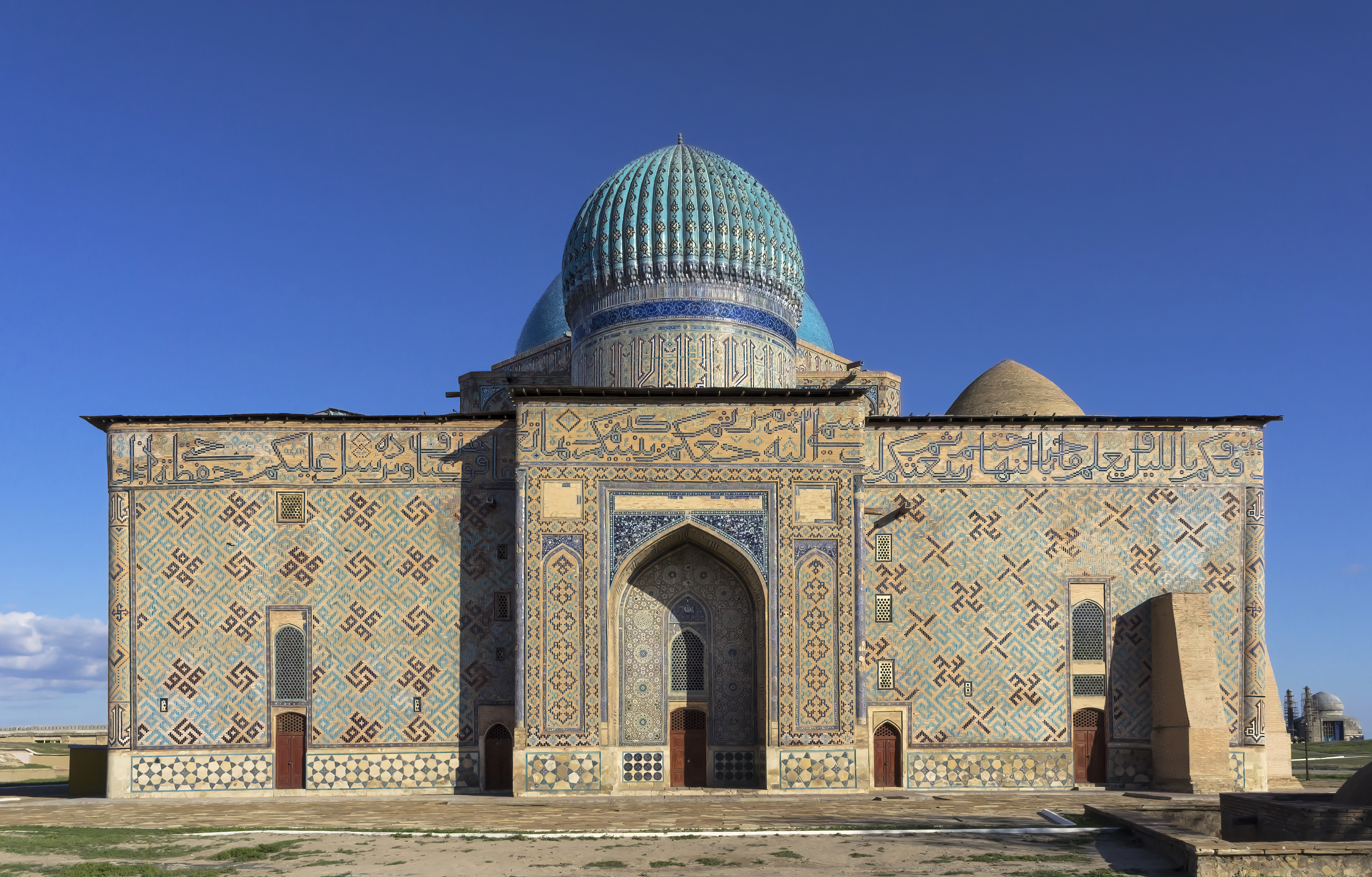
Mausoleum of Khoja Ahmed Yassaui

=== Cuisine ===
In the national cuisine, livestock meat, like horse meat and beef can be cooked in a variety of ways and is usually served with a wide assortment of traditional bread products. Refreshments include black tea, often served with milk and dried fruits (such as dried apricots) and nuts. In southern provinces, people often prefer green tea. Traditional milk-derived drinks such as ayran, shubat and kymyz. A traditional Kazakh dinner involves a variety of appetisers on the table, followed by a soup and one or two main courses such as pilaf and beshbarmak. They also drink their national beverage, kumys, which consists of fermented mare's milk.

=== Sport ===
Astana Arena opened in 2009.

Kazakhstan consistently performs in Olympic competitions. It is especially successful in boxing. This has brought some attention to the Central Asian nation and increased world awareness of its athletes. Dmitry Karpov and Olga Rypakova are among the most notable Kazakhstani athletes. Dmitry Karpov is a distinguished decathlete, taking bronze in both the 2004 Summer Olympics and the 2003 and 2007 World Athletics Championships. Olga Rypakova is an athlete, specializing in triple jump (women's), taking silver in the 2011 World Championships in Athletics and Gold in the 2012 Summer Olympics. Mikhail Shaidorov won gold in the 2026 Winter Olympics in Men's Figure Skating. Kazakhstan's city of Almaty submitted bids twice for the Winter Olympics: in 2014 and again for the 2022 Winter Olympics. Astana and Almaty hosted the 2011 Asian Winter Games.

Popular sports in Kazakhstan include football, basketball, ice hockey, bandy, and boxing. Football is the most popular sport in Kazakhstan. The Football Federation of Kazakhstan is the sport's national governing body. The FFK organizes the men's, women's, and futsal national teams.

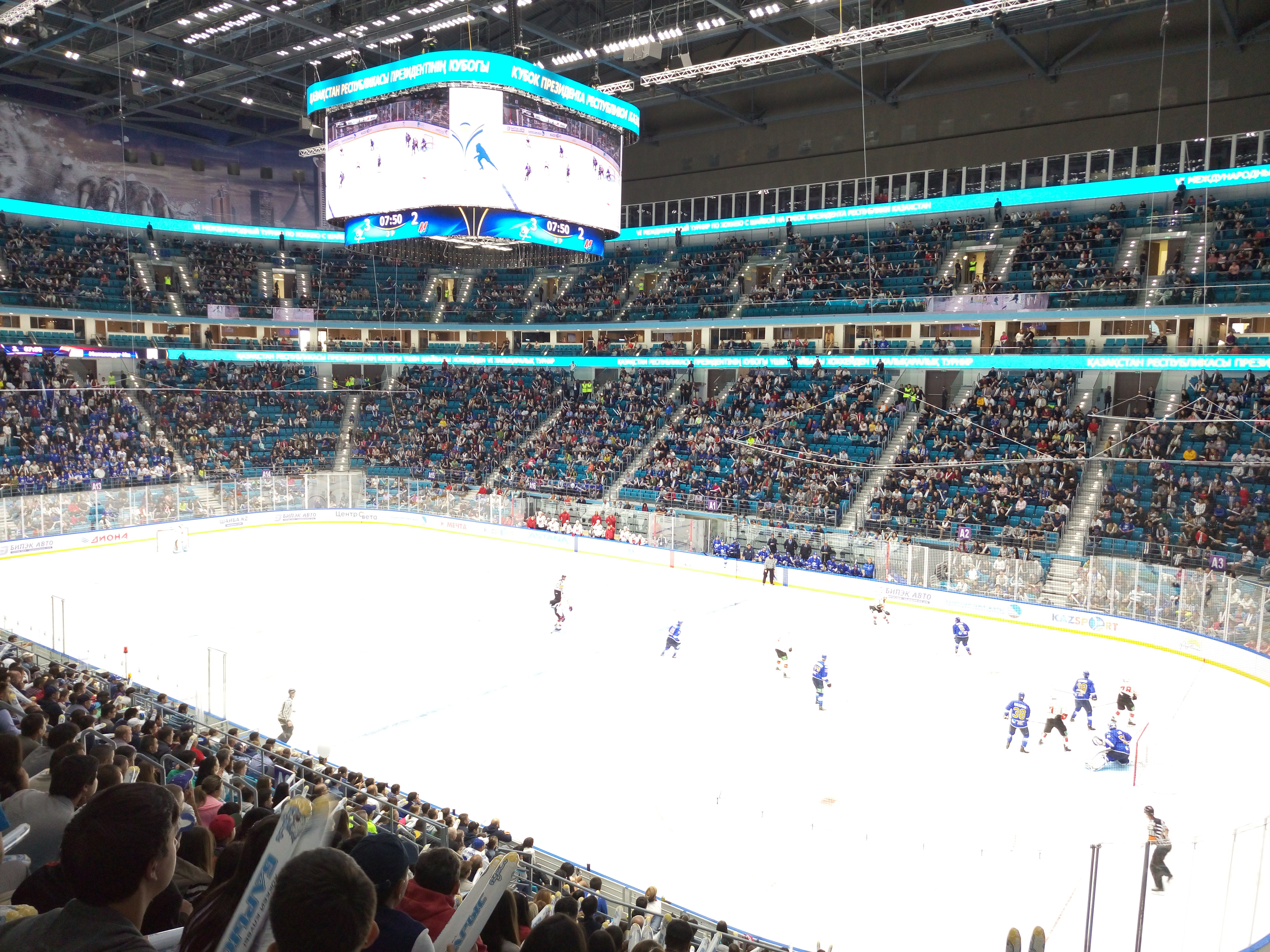
Barys Arena in 2015

Kazakhstan's most famous basketball player was Alzhan Zharmukhamedov, who played for CSKA Moscow and the Soviet Union's national basketball team in the 1960s and 1970s. Kazakhstan's national basketball team was established in 1992, after the dissolution of the Soviet Union. Since its foundation, it has been competitive at the continental level. Its greatest accomplishment was at the 2002 Asian Games, where it defeated the Philippines in its last game to win the bronze medal. At the official Asian Basketball Championship, now called FIBA Asia Cup, the Kazakhs' best finish was 4th place in 2007.

The Kazakhstan national bandy team is among the best in the world, and has many times won the bronze medal at the Bandy World Championship, including the 2012 edition when Kazakhstan hosted the tournament on home ice. The team won the first bandy tournament at the Asian Winter Games. During the Soviet time, Dynamo Alma-Ata won the Soviet Union national championships in 1977 and 1990 and the European Cup in 1978. Bandy is developed in ten of the country's seventeen administrative divisions (eight of the fourteen regions and two of the three cities which are situated inside of but are not part of regions).

The Kazakh national ice hockey team competed at the 1998 Winter Olympics and 2006 Winter Olympics, as well as the 2006 Men's World Ice Hockey Championships. The Kazakhstan Hockey Championship has been held since 1992. Barys Astana is the country's main professional ice hockey team and joined the Kontinental Hockey League in 2008–09. Kazzinc-Torpedo has played in the Supreme Hockey League since 1996, while Saryarka Karagandy joined in 2012. Notable Kazakhstani players include Nik Antropov, Ivan Kulshov, and Evgeni Nabokov. Kazakh boxers are well known internationally, having won more Olympic boxing medals than any country except Cuba and Russia across the last three Games. Three Kazakh boxers—Vassiliy Jirov (1996), Bakhtiyar Artayev (2004), and Serik Sapiyev (2012)—won the Val Barker Trophy as the tournament's best boxer. At the 2000 Summer Olympics, Bekzat Sattarkhanov and Yermakhan Ibraimov won gold medals, while Bulat Zhumadilov and Mukhtarkhan Dildabekov won silver. Kazakh-born boxers have also achieved success internationally, including Oleg Maskaev, who represented Russia and won the WBC heavyweight title, and Gennady Golovkin, a multiple-time world middleweight champion. Natascha Ragosina, born in Qarağandy and representing Russia, won multiple women's super middleweight and heavyweight titles and held records for the longest-reigning WBA and WBC female super middleweight champion.

=== UNESCO World Heritage sites ===
Kazakhstan has three cultural and two natural sites on the UNESCO World Heritage list. The cultural sites are:

- Mausoleum of Khoja Ahmed Yassaui, added in 2003
- Petroglyphs within the Archaeological Landscape of Tamgaly, added in 2004
- Silk Roads: the Routes Network of Chang'an-Tianshan Corridor, added in 2014

The natural sites are:

- Saryarka - Steppe and Lakes of Northern Kazakhstan, added in 2008
- Western Tien Shan, added in 2016

== See also ==
- Outline of Kazakhstan
- List of cities in Kazakhstan
- Aurora Minerals Group – Kazakh mining company
