= Irreligion in Kazakhstan =

According to the 2021 census, only 2.25% of the population said they were Atheist, a decrease from the 2009 Census. According to one study, Atheists constituted 18.8% of those who participated in the 2019 study, which was conducted by a government-affiliated think tank. However, another 2019 CRA study shows that 92.8 percent of the population self-identified as religious.

Religious affiliation of the population of Kazakhstan (estimate 2020)
| Religious affiliation of the responders | Population | Share of the population % |
|---|---|---|
| Islam | 12,870,000 | 70.19 |
| Christianity | 4,130,000 | 26.17 |
| Judaism | < 10,000 | 0.03 |
| Buddhism | 60,000 | 0.09 |
| Other religions | 90,000 | 0.19 |
| No religion | 720,000 | 2.81 |
| Did not answer | < 10,000 | 0.51 |
| Total | 17,880,000 | 100.00 |

Religious affiliation of ethnic groups in Kazakhstan (preliminary results of the 2009 census)
| Ethnic group | Islam | Christianity | Judaism | Buddhism | other religions | unbelievers | did not answer | total |
|---|---|---|---|---|---|---|---|---|
| Kazakhs | 9928705 | 39172 | 1929 | 749 | 1612 | 98511 | 26085 | 10096763 |
| Russians | 54277 | 3476748 | 1452 | 730 | 1011 | 230935 | 28611 | 3793764 |
| Uzbeks | 452668 | 1794 | 34 | 28 | 78 | 1673 | 722 | 456997 |
| Ukrainians | 3134 | 302199 | 108 | 49 | 74 | 24329 | 3138 | 333031 |
| Uighurs | 221007 | 1142 | 34 | 33 | 63 | 1377 | 1057 | 224713 |
| Tatars | 162496 | 20913 | 47 | 58 | 123 | 16569 | 4023 | 204229 |
| Germans | 2827 | 145556 | 89 | 66 | 192 | 24905 | 4774 | 178409 |
| Koreans | 5256 | 49543 | 211 | 11446 | 138 | 28615 | 5176 | 100385 |
| Turks | 96172 | 290 | 7 | 6 | 20 | 321 | 199 | 97015 |
| Azerbaijanis | 80864 | 2139 | 16 | 16 | 24 | 1586 | 647 | 85292 |
| Belarusians | 526 | 59936 | 25 | 9 | 20 | 5198 | 762 | 66476 |
| Dungan | 51388 | 191 | 4 | 15 | 19 | 179 | 148 | 51944 |
| Kurds | 37667 | 203 | 11 | 6 | 9 | 285 | 144 | 38325 |
| Tajiks | 35473 | 331 | 2 | 6 | 30 | 307 | 128 | 36277 |
| Poles | 235 | 30675 | 14 | 4 | 45 | 2486 | 598 | 34057 |
| Chechens | 29448 | 940 | 6 | 3 | 16 | 653 | 365 | 31431 |
| Kirghiz | 22500 | 206 | 6 | 6 | 4 | 352 | 200 | 23274 |
| Other nationalities | 54533 | 82254 | 1286 | 1433 | 210 | 13266 | 4233 | 157215 |
| All: | 11239176 | 4214232 | 5281 | 14663 | 3688 | 451547 | 81010 | 16009597 |

== See also ==
- Religion in Kazakhstan
- Freedom of religion in Kazakhstan
- Christianity in Kazakhstan
- Islam in Kazakhstan
- Demographics of Kazakhstan
