= Religion in Kazakhstan =

Religion in Kazakhstan (2021 Census)
1. Islam (69.3%)
2. Christianity (17.2%)
3. No religion (2.30%)
4. Other religions (0.20%)
5. Undeclared (11.0%)

According to various polls, the majority of Kazakhstan's citizens, primarily ethnic Kazakhs, identify as Sunni Muslims.

According to the 2021 census, 69.3% of the population is Muslim, 17.2% are Christian, 0.2% follow other religions (mostly Buddhist and Jewish), 11.01% chose not to answer, and 2.25% identify as atheist.

There are a total of 3,000 mosques, all of them affiliated with the "Spiritual Association of Muslims of Kazakhstan", headed by a supreme mufti. The Eid al-Adha is recognized as a national holiday.

In 2020, 20% of the population was Orthodox Christian, traditionally including ethnic Russians, Ukrainians and Belarusians. In 2011, other Christian groups in the country included Catholics and Protestants (Baptists, Presbyterians, Lutherans, Pentecostals, Methodists, Mennonites and Seventh-day Adventists), including restorationist Christian faiths such as Jehovah's Witnesses and The Church of Jesus Christ of Latter Day Saints. In 2011 there were a total of 175 registered Orthodox churches, 53 Catholic churches, and 343 Protestant churches and prayer houses; other religious registered groups included Judaism, the Baháʼí Faith, Hinduism, Buddhism, the Church of Scientology, Christian Science, and the Unification Church. The Ahmadiyya community is not registered despite several attempts since 2011.

Christmas, rendered in the Russian Orthodox manner according to the Julian calendar, is recognized as a national holiday in Kazakhstan.

The government considers several religions as 'traditional', including Hanafi Sunni Islam, the Russian Orthodox Church, Greek and Roman Catholicism, Lutheranism, and Judaism; some parts of the country can be wary of members of 'nontraditional' minority religious groups.

In 2022, President Tokayev stated that the country was a "secular and tolerant country" but noted that the authorities will not "turn a blind eye to various radical movements and religious separatism.”

== Religious history ==
Church of the East and its largest extent during the Middle Ages.

The country has historically hosted a wide variety of ethnic groups with varying religions. The foundation of an independent republic, following the disintegration of the USSR, has launched a great deal of changes in every aspect of people's lives. Religiosity of the population, as an essential part of any cultural identity, has undergone dynamic transformations as well.

Baptist Churches are often raided. This is due to the church members gathering without registering themselves, a requirement of the country. Anyone who does not register risk being raided by the police. However not only those that violate the law are treated harshly.

On May 2, 2017, a court in the capital of Astana, Kazakhstan, sentenced a 61-year-old man to a five-year prison sentence for performing Bible education work. Teymur Akhmedov, is a member of Jehovah's Witnesses. The court called his preaching and teaching efforts “inciting religious discord” and “advocating [religious] superiority.” In addition, the judge also imposed a three-year ban on Mr. Akhmedov’s participation in Bible education activities. Mr Akhmedov's medical issues were not considered, as he requires treatment for a bleeding tumor and has been denied the medical attention that he requires.

After decades of suppressed culture, the people were feeling a great need to exhibit their ethnic identity - in part through religion. Quantitative research shows that for the first years after the establishment of the new laws, waiving any restrictions on religious beliefs and proclaiming full freedom of confessions, the country experienced a huge spike in religious activity of its citizens. Hundreds of mosques, synagogues, churches, and other religious structures were built in a matter of years. All represented religions benefited from increased number of members and facilities. Many confessions that were absent before independence made their way into the country, appealing to hundreds of people. The government supported this activity, and has done its best to provide equality among all religious organizations and their followers. In the late 1990s, however, a slight decline in religiosity occurred. The draft religion law being considered in June 2008 has raised international concern over whether there is an intention to meet general standards of freedom of religion and human rights.

== Islam ==
Astana Grand Mosque, the largest mosque in Central Asia.

Islam is the most commonly practiced religion in Kazakhstan; it was introduced to the region during the 9th century. Traditionally ethnic Kazakhs are Muslims who mainly follow the Hanafi school.

Kazakhs including other ethnic groups of Muslim background make up over 90 per cent of all Muslims. The southern region of the country has the highest concentration of self-identified practicing Muslims.

== Religious minorities ==
=== Christianity ===
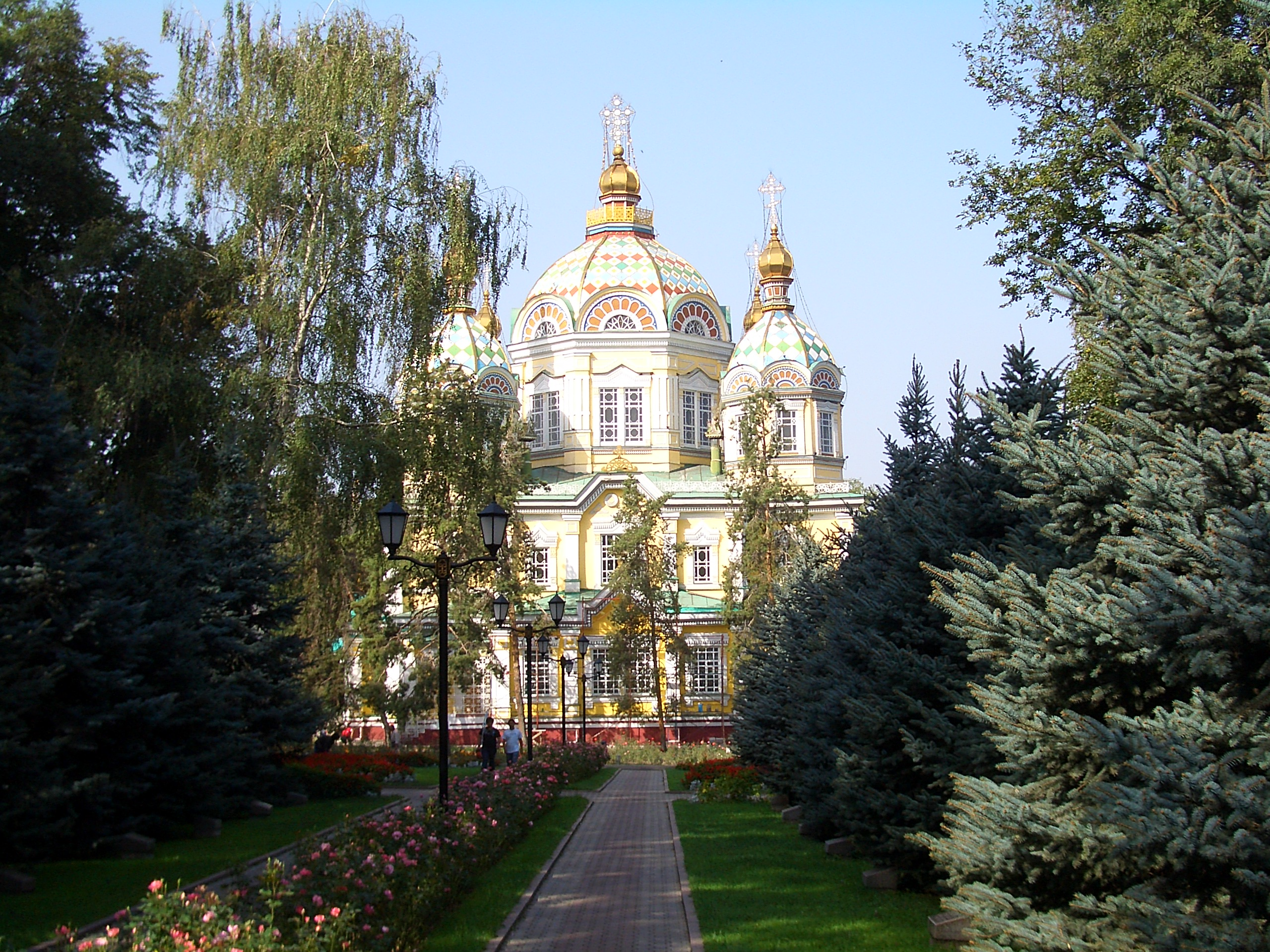
Ascension Cathedral in Almaty

Christianity in Kazakhstan is the second most practiced religion after Islam. Most Christian citizens are Russians, and to a lesser extent Ukrainians and Belarusians, who belong to the Russian Orthodox Church.

The 2021 census noted that Kazakhstan is 17.19% Christian. Other figures suggest that 24% of the population is Orthodox, 1% is either Catholic or Protestant and 1% belongs to other Christian denominations.

In 2009, Christian groups included Lutheranism, Presbyterians, Methodists, Seventh-day Adventists, Pentecostals, Baptist (Union of Evangelical Christian Baptists of Kazakhstan), Mennonites and Mormons.

Jehovah's Witnesses are also present in the country although the group faces many restrictions by the government in the past.

"Kazakhstan is the strange core of traditionalist Catholicism," Catholic writer Ross Douthat stated in 2018.

=== Baháʼí Faith ===
The Baháʼí Faith in Kazakhstan began during the policy of oppression of religion in the former Soviet Union. Before that time, Kazakhstan, as part of the Russian Empire, would have had indirect contact with the Baháʼí Faith as far back as 1847. Following the entrance of Baháʼí pioneers the community grew to be the largest religious community after Islam and Christianity, though only a few percent of the nation. By 1994 the National Spiritual Assembly of Kazakhstan was elected and the community has begun to multiply its efforts across various interests. The Association of Religion Data Archives (relying on World Christian Encyclopedia) estimated some 7,000 Baháʼís in 2010.

=== Judaism ===
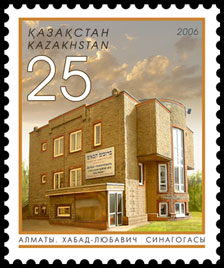
Chabad-Lubavitch synagogue in Almaty, depicted on a postage stamp from Kazakhstan in 2006.

Kazakh Jews have a long history. There are approximately 2,500-3,300 Jews in Kazakhstan, less than 1% of the population. Most Kazakh Jews are Ashkenazi and speak Russian.

=== Buddhism ===
Buddhism has existed in Kazakhstan since the 17th century, which is evidenced by the ancient pagodas and temples discovered by scientists during excavations. At present, there are only two officially registered Buddhist organisations in Kazakhstan, one belongs to Won Buddhism that originated from Korea and the other organization belongs to Tibetan Buddhism.

According to the 2009 Census, there were 14,663 Buddhists in Kazakhstan. Also, according to from general Population census results of the Kazakhstan 2021, there are around 15,458 Buddhists in the country

=== Hinduism ===
Hindus in Kazakhstan are mainly composed of the ISKCON sect and Diaspora Hindus from India. There were about 801 Hindus in Kazakhstan in 2010 according to ARDA.

=== Pagan ===
- Slavic Neopaganism

=== Tengrism ===
Tengrism is a Central Asian religion characterized by shamanism, animism, totemism, poly- and monotheism and ancestor worship. It was the prevailing religion of the Turks, Mongols, Hungarians, Xiongnu and Huns, and the religion of the five ancient Turkic states: Göktürk Khaganate, Western Turkic Khaganate, Great Bulgaria, Bulgarian Empire and Eastern Tourkia (Khazaria). In Irk Bitig, Tengri is mentioned as Türük Tängrisi (God of Turks).

Tengrists view their existence as sustained by the eternal blue sky (Tengri), the fertile mother-earth spirit (Umay) and a ruler regarded as the holy spirit of the sky. Heaven, earth, spirits of nature and ancestors provide for every need and protect all humans. By living an upright, respectful life, a human will keep his world in balance and perfect his personal Wind Horse, or spirit. The Huns of the northern Caucasus reportedly believed in two gods: Tangri Han (or Tengri Khan), considered identical to the Persian Aspandiat and for whom horses were sacrificed, and Kuar (whose victims are struck by lightning). Tengrism is practiced in Kazakhstan, Sakha, Buryatia, Tuva and Mongolia in parallel with Tibetan Buddhism and Burkhanism.

== Freedom of religion and religious tolerance ==
Kazakhstan has a very diverse and stable religious background. However, some reported occurrences of persecution against Hare Krishnas and Jehovah's Witnesses for proselytizing have raised concern in the international community.

Article 22 of the Constitution of the Republic of Kazakhstan states that "everyone has the right to a freedom of conscience." On May 18, 2011, the President of Kazakhstan adopted a decree establishing the Agency for Religious Affairs. The mission of the Agency is to coordinate interaction between the government, religious groups and civil society in order to ensure religious freedom in Kazakhstan.

In 2003, Kazakhstan established the Congress of Leaders of World and Traditional Religions, which aims to facilitate religious dialogue ensuring inter-religious tolerance and freedom in Kazakhstan.

In 2023, the country was scored 1 out of 4 for religious freedom. It was noted that legal amendments in 2022 placed extra restrictions on citizens.

== Regional distribution ==
There is an increase in the share of people who refused to specify a religion from the previous census. As of the 2021 census regional distribution of the religions are as follows:

Region	Islam		Christianity		Other		No religion		Undeclared	
Region	#	%	#	%	#	%	#	%	#	%
Total	13,297,775	69.31%	3,297,550	17.19%	45,897	0.24%	432,140	2.25%	2,112,653	11.01%
Akmola Region	362,070	46.24%	287,619	36.73%	1,481	0.19%	14,578	1.86%	117,247	14.97%
Aktobe Region	760,924	83.97%	88,968	9.82%	1,788	0.20%	15,298	1.69%	39,242	4.33%
Almaty	1,172,838	57.77%	353,477	17.41%	11,501	0.56%	87,622	4.32%	404,847	19.94%
Almaty Region	1,482,673	69.07%	213,791	9.96%	5,340	0.25%	28,045	1.31%	416,727	19.41%
Astana	968,445	78.48%	135,656	10.99%	3,686	0.30%	28,474	2.31%	97,781	7.92%
Atyrau Region	563,53	83.66%	29,513	4.38%	870	0.13%	6,395	0.95%	73,284	10.88%
East Kazakhstan Region	846,457	63.11%	447,764	33.38%	2,984	0.22%	28,108	2.10%	15,979	1.19%
Jambyl Region	1,009,257	84.16%	90,275	7.53%	2,045	0.17%	14,403	1.20%	83,279	6.94%
Karaganda Region	701,013	51.99%	441,806	32.76%	5,988	0.44%	50,671	3.76%	148,990	11.05%
Kostanay Region	308,024	36.95%	366,880	44.01%	1,244	0.28%	40,343	4.84%	116,064	13.92%
Kyzylorda Region	784,051	96.21%	14,465	1.77%	666	0.09%	2,722	0.33%	13,027	1.60%
Mangystau Region	508,701	69.21%	30,967	4.18%	907	0.16%	32,191	4.38%	162,242	22.07%
Pavlodar Region	431,885	57.07%	286,298	37.83%	1,807	0.24%	16,508	2.18%	20,257	2.68%
North Kazakhstan Region	209,397	38.72%	298,288	55.16%	1,143	0.21%	10,035	1.86%	21,923	4.05%
Turkistan Region	1,897,485	92.38%	32,341	1.57%	792	0.05%	5,009	0.24%	118,394	5.76%
West Kazakhstan Region	529,961	78.44%	106,732	15.80%	1,342	0.19%	11,147	1.65%	26,473	3.92%

== Religion by ethnic group ==
According to the 2021 Census data, most of the population of Turkic ethnic groups have Muslims and most of the population of European peoples are Orthodox Christians (although up to 3 percent of them are Muslim), while Koreans are mixed between various faiths including Christianity, Buddhism, irreligion, and Islam.

Ethnic Group	Islam	Christianity	Judaism	Buddhism	Other	No religion	Not Stated
Kazakhs	89.21%	0.34%	0.02%	0.01%	0.09%	1.08%	9.25%
Russians	1.96%	85.52%	0.05%	0.03%	0.23%	4.73%	7.48%
Uzbeks	77.76%	0.15%	0.01%	0.00%	0.03%	1.65%	20.40%
Ukrainians	2.44%	78.34%	0.09%	0.02%	0.20%	6.00%	12.93%
Uyghurs	71.87%	0.21%	0.02%	0.01%	0.06%	4.46%	23.37%
Germans	2.82%	77.30%	0.04%	0.02%	0.39%	6.20%	13.24%
Tatars	53.03%	24.09%	0.04%	0.03%	0.34%	6.38%	16.09%
Azerbaijanis	67.00%	0.73%	0.01%	0.01%	0.07%	4.85%	27.33%
Koreans	18.72%	35.75%	0.14%	10.72%	0.52%	16.44%	17.71%
Turks	69.90%	0.13%	0.01%	0.00%	0.02%	4.54%	25.39%
Dungans	71.32%	0.07%	0.01%	0.01%	0.03%	4.29%	24.27%
Belarusians	2.87%	76.93%	0.05%	0.02%	0.18%	5.08%	14.87%
Tajiks	72.91%	0.32%	0.00%	0.00%	0.02%	4.14%	22.62%
Kurds	68.05%	0.18%	0.00%	0.01%	0.04%	5.05%	26.67%
Kyrgyz	71.86%	0.20%	0.00%	0.01%	0.05%	4.94%	22.94%
Chechens	67.88%	1.26%	0.04%	0.01%	0.04%	5.41%	25.37%
Poles	2.14%	78.03%	0.07%	0.03%	0.24%	3.44%	16.05%
Others	9.26%	14.59%	0.97%	0.25%	0.23%	9.05%	65.65%
Total	69.31%	17.19%	0.04%	0.08%	0.12%	2.25%	11.01%

== See also ==
- Demographics of Kazakhstan
