= Duman Mukhammedkarim =

Kazakhstani journalist (1978-)

Duman Almasūly Mūhammedkärim (Kazakh: Думан Алмасұлы Мұхаммедкәрім, [do̙wˈmɑn ɑɫˈmɑso̙ɫɯ mo̙χɑmːʲetkʰæˈrɘm]; born 9 July 1978) is a Kazakh journalist. After decades of working for the Qazaqstan Radio and Television Corporation, he founded his own YouTube channel, Ne Deidi (lit. 'What's being said?'), in 2015, from which he covered significant events in Kazakhstan, including most notably the 2022 Kazakh unrest. In 2023, Mukhammedkarim was arrested and detained multiple times over a three-month period, and since June 2023, he has been detained under charges of funding and participating in extremist activities, which human rights organisations have described as "dubious" and a "gross violation" of human rights.

== Early life and career ==
Mukhammedkarim was born in Urzhar, a village in what is now the Abai Region of Kazakhstan, to Aimaz Tilepov and Kalimash Rymbekovyna. During the 1990s, he started working for Kazakhstan's state broadcaster, Qazaqstan Radio and Television Corporation, first at local stations in Semey and Astana, before working for national television channels and radio stations. He also briefly acted as a press secretary for an akim in the West Kazakhstan Region.

== Independent journalism and activism ==
In 2015, Mukhammedkarim created his own YouTube channel entitled Ne Deydi (Kazakh: Не дейді, lit. 'what are they saying?'), which had 145, 000 subscribers as of February 2024. Through the channel, he reported on significant events within Kazakhstan, notably becoming one of the few journalists to report on the January Events of 2022, and the subsequent government crackdown, from the scene in Almaty.

=== November 2022 arrests ===
In November 2022, following the presidential election, in which the incumbent Kassym-Jomart Tokayev was re-elected, Mukhammedkarim described the process as "illegal" and called for peaceful protests, describing Tokayev as being just as repressive as his predecessor, Nursultan Nazarbayev, despite presenting himself as a reformist. Following his comments, he was arrested for the first time and detained for 15 days before being released.

=== 2023 arrests ===
In March 2023, Mukhammedkarim ran as an independent candidate in local elections for the Almaty Regional Mäslihat as part of a broader coalition of activists running as independents. Mukhammedkarim was initially rejected as a candidate, but after suing the electoral commission, he was added to the ballot; he was ultimately not elected as a deputy. After the results were published, Mukhammedkarim called for a protest rally to dispute the results, and was subsequently arrested and detained for 25 days, being released on 15 April.

On 1 May 2023, Mukhammedkarim was arrested again, and detained for a further 25 days, after mentioning in a YouTube video a rally that had been called for by Democratic Choice of Kazakhstan, a political party officially denoted as "extremist" by the Kazakhstani government. He was charged with "violating the order of peaceful assembly", and was released on 26 May.

Two days after being released, on 28 May 2023, Mukhammedkarim was arrested for a third time that year, after calling for a rally to be held on 31 May to commemorate victims of the famine of 1930 to 1933. The following day, Mukhammedkarim went on hunger strike to protest his arrests and the charges against him. His father also went on strike in front of the prosecutor's office in Ile District, but was forced to stop on 6 June due to high blood pressure; Mukhammedkarim ended his own strike on 12 June.

On 22 June 2023, the date his detention was supposed to end, Mukhammedkarim's detention was extended for a further two months as two new charges were filed against him, of "financing extremist activities" and "participating in the activities of a banned extremist organisation" in breach of articles 405 and 258 of the criminal code, respectively. The charges were linked to an interview Mukhammedkarim had posted on Ne Deidi with Mukhtar Ablyazov, the exiled head of the Democratic Choice of Kazakhstan, who had been considered an extremist since a 2018 court ruling. Mukhammedkarim's solicitor, Ghalym Nurpeisov, appealed the decision, citing his poor health due to experiencing kidney issues following his hunger strike. Mukhammedkarim was detained in Taldykorgan in Jetisu Region.

In December 2023, Mukhammedkarim's detention was extended again for at least an additional month, according to Nurpeisov. Nurpeisov also claimed that authorities had offered to sentence Mukhammedkarim to six years imprisonment if he agreed to give up his work as a journalist, an offer that had been declined by Mukhammedkarim. That same month, the Minister of Information, Darkhan Kydyraly, publicly stated that Mukhammedkarim had been arrested for his political views and not due to his journalism.

In January 2024, it was announced that Mukhammedkarim's trial would start on 12 February 2024. A state-commissioned psychological and philological analysis of Mukhammedkarim's interview with Ablyazov found that Mukhammedkarim's words "promoted extremist ideas and views" and "showed signs of participation" with the Democratic Choice of Kazakhstan, though concluded he had also discussed the importance of peaceful protest and had not called for the forceful seizure of power. Two additional videos from April 2023 were found to show "signs of propaganda" for extremist ideology. Additional information cited by prosecutors as evidence of funding extremism stemmed from Mukhammedkarim commenting on his interview with Ablyazov with a link to donate to him.

=== Response ===
Human Rights Watch accused the Kazakhstani government of attempting to silence Mukhammedkarim due to his status as an independent journalist who frequently criticised Kazakhstani authorities. They compared the charges against him as being similar to those levied against other government critics, including politician Marat Zhylanbayev, who had been sentenced to seven years in prison in 2023 on extremism charges widely considered to be fraudulent.

The International Federation of Journalists called Mukhammedkarim's arrest as "contrary to freedom of expression and freedom of the press".

The Kazakhstan International Bureau for Human Rights and Rule of Law identified that Mukhammedkarim's rights as a journalist were guaranteed by the International Covenant on Civil and Political Rights, which had been ratified by Kazakhstan, and stated that the Kazakhstani government was "grossly violating" these rights.

== See also ==
- Marat Zhylanbayev: Kazakh politician similarly dubiously charged with extremism
