= Bakhytzhan Toregozhina =

Human rights activist in Kazakhstan

- Бақытжан Төреғожина
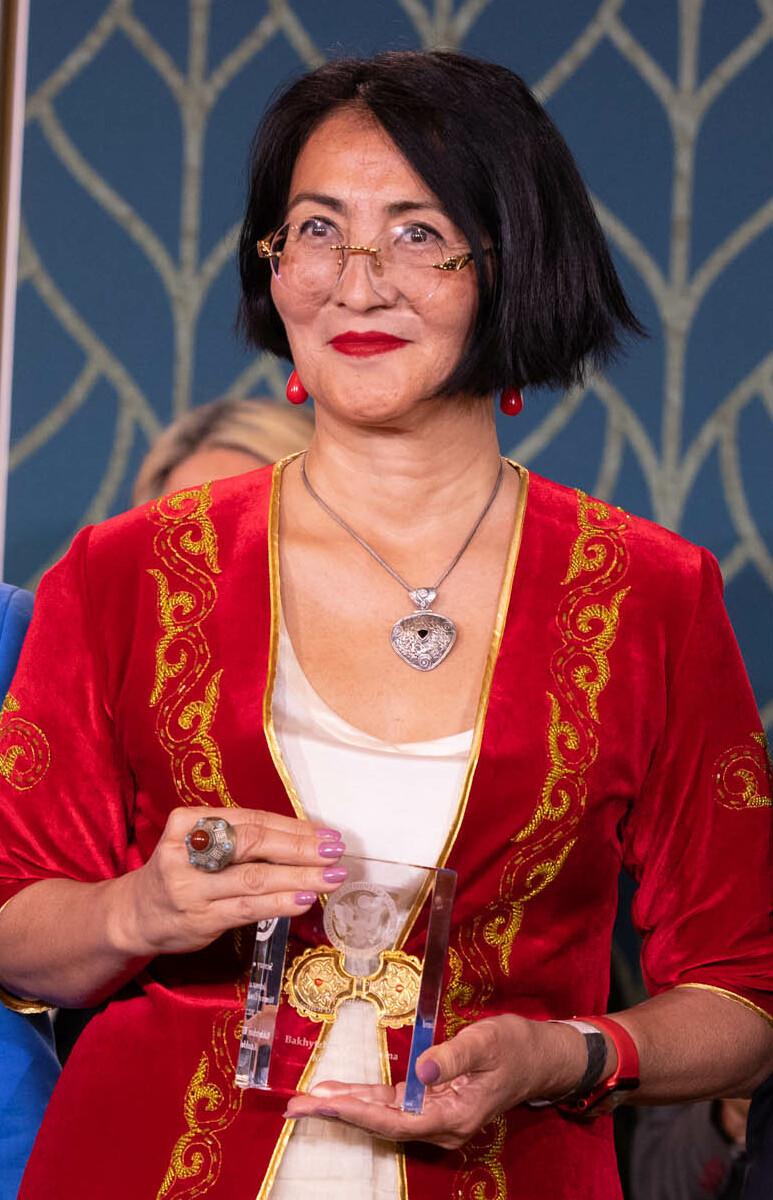
- Toregozhina during her VOA interview on her International Women of Courage Award
- Born: 23 March 1962 (age 64)
- Occupation: Human rights activist
- Years active: 1999–present
- Awards: International Women of Courage Award

Bakhytzhan Toregozhina (Kazakh: Бақытжан Төреғожина; born 23 March 1962) is a Kazakhstani human rights activist who campaigned against the violations of fundamental rights in Kazakhstan for over two decades. She has been the head of a coalition of civil societies, Qantar 2022, and the president of another Public Foundation, Ar.Rukh.Khak which represents Dignity, Spirit, and Truth. She also organized various youth movements. Toregozhina was acclaimed as a leading voice representing victims of torture, abuse, and politicized repression. On 8 March 2023, she received the 2023 International Women of Courage Award, which was presented to her and other nominees by Jill Biden and Antony J. Blinken at the U.S. Department of State.

== Early life ==
Bakhytzhan Toregozhina was born on 23 March 1962 and is a Kazakhstan national.

== Career ==
Toregozhina is a human rights activist on the rule of law and worked to assist victims, document human rights violations, and defend people persecuted for expressing their rights. She began promoting the development of NGOs in 1999 and in the following years, she worked on fundraising activities for a network of human rights organizations and peaceful assemblies. She has been a member of councils that oversee the status of political prisoners and prisoners of conscience. Alyan Tirek was reported as another effort that she worked on which provided humanitarian and legal assistance to prisoners. In 2017, she gave a press conference on Iskander Erimbetov's torture in custody. For nearly 25 years, she has been a voice against torture and campaigned for the release of political prisoners.

== Human rights organizations and activism ==
Toregozhina founded or co-founded various human rights organizations. She has been serving as the head of the Qantar 2022, and another Public Foundation known as Ar. Rukh. Khak. In 2004, she initiated Kahar, a popular youth movement that served as an inspiration for the formation of other youth groups. In 2005, she organized NGOs to monitor parliamentary elections. Toregozhina also mobilized students and youth through summer schools of democracy and served as a liaison for the implementation of jury laws and related topics in higher education institutions. In 2012, she co-founded Sailau, a coalition of NGOs that monitored elections. She also participated in the drafting of alternative laws on elections.

In 2020, Toregozhina raised concerns about Kazakhstan's repressive system against activists during COVID-19 global pandemic. The restrictions were on freedom of speech, access to information, compliance with and exercise of human rights including treatment of people, supply of medications, and restriction on the rights of peaceful assemblies behind the scene.

Mass arrest of protestors prompted the 5 January 2022 unrest in major cities across Kazakhstan. Toregozhina described the situation as a political puzzle and as a populist measure taken to score political points ahead of the election. On 1 September 2022, President Tokayev announced an amnesty for the protesters but this raised controversies about whether the amnesty protects most peaceful demonstrators, human rights defenders, and civil activists from “extremist” charges, and its limitation to acquit those convicted.

== Detentions and raid ==
=== 2005 police raid ===
Police entered a youth group office with parents compliant against Toregozhina for allegedly recruiting children for political activity, and for rewarding the youth with money from abroad. Human Rights Watch reported that large numbers of police broke up a peaceful demonstration (involving releasing balloons) sponsored by Kahar on April 12 and its concern on governments' measure to discourage youth activism.

=== 2010 detention ===
On 16 March 2010, police entered Toregozhina's office, arrested and convicted her for organizing an “art-mob” event during civil disobedience Commemoration day which she presented a legal case against the government for the violations of her constitutional rights.

=== 2016 detention ===
At least 33 people, including Toregozhina, were detained between 16 and 20 May 2016, due to reported violations related to Facebook posts on a demonstration and land issues.

=== 2022 persecution ===
Toregozhina was listed as one of the human rights defenders who are subjected to political persecution related to the January 2022 unrest.

=== 2025 detention ===
On 17 August 2025, Toregozhina was detained and held for several hours by police officers in connection to an investigation on charges of being a member of a banned extremist organisation after making social media posts supporting Marat Zhylanbayev. On 20 August, Almaty City Court upheld a decision by the Specialised Interdistrict Administrative Court to fine Toregozhina for "disseminating false information".

== Pegasus censorship ==
OCCRP reported that Toregozhina was among the Pegasus targeted politicians, journalists, and human rights activists for wiretapping or surveillance. Pegasus was developed by the Israeli company, NSO Group and used to spy on various politically active groups.

== Awards ==
Toregozhina received the 2023 International Women of Courage Award which recognized those who demonstrated exceptional courage, strength, and leadership. Her contributions were applauded as vital human rights defenders' role in holding governments accountable and encouraging respect for basic rights and freedoms. The ceremony was hosted by the U.S. Department of State.

== See also ==
- International Women of Courage Award
- List of women's rights activists
- Human rights in Kazakhstan
