= Demographics of Kazakhstan =

- Population pyramid of Kazakhstan in 2023
- Population: 21,180,829 (November 8, 2026)
- Density: 7.77307/km^{2}
- Growth rate: 8.6/1,000 population (2024 est.)
- Birth rate: 16.4 births/1,000 population (2025 est.)
- Death rate: 6.6 deaths/1,000 population (2025 est.)
- Life expectancy: 73.3 years (2024 est.)
  - male: 69 years
  - female: 77.9 years
- Fertility rate: 2.8 children born/woman (2024 est.)
- Infant mortality: 8 deaths/1,000 live births (2024 est.)
- Net migration rate: −0.4 migrant(s)/1,000 population (2024 est.)
- Immigrant share: 10.1% (2024)

Age structure
- 0–14 years: 29.5% (male 3,001,983/female 2,833,471)
- 15–64 years: 62.0% (male 6,028,354/female 6,224,431)
- 65 and over: 8.5% (male 617,364/female 1,061,204) (2023 Est.)

Sex ratio
- Total: 0.95 male(s)/female
- At birth: 1.06 male(s)/female
- Under 15: 1.05 male(s)/female
- 15–64 years: 0.95 male(s)/female
- 65 and over: 0.54 male(s)/female

Nationality
- Nationality: Kazakhstani
- Major ethnic: Kazakh (71.5%)
- Minor ethnic: Russian (14.4%); Uzbek (3.4%); Ukrainian (1.8%); Uyghur (1.5%); German (1.1%); Tatar (1.1%); Others (5.2%)

Language
- Official: Kazakh
- Spoken: Languages of Kazakhstan

The demographics of Kazakhstan enumerate the demographic features of the population of Kazakhstan, including population growth, population density, ethnicity, education level, health, economic status, religious affiliations, and other aspects of the population. Some use the word Kazakh to refer to the Kazakh ethnic group and language (autochthonous to Kazakhstan as well as parts of China and Mongolia) and Kazakhstani to refer to Kazakhstan and its citizens regardless of ethnicity, but it is common to use Kazakh in both senses. It is expected that by 2050, the population will range from 23.5 to 27.7 million people.

== Overview ==
Official estimates put the population of Kazakhstan at 21,133,071 as of Augus 20, 2026, of which 62.7% is urban and 37.3% is rural population. In a report released by the United Nations Department of Economic and Social Affairs (DESA) in September 2021, the level of urbanization in Kazakhstan is estimated to reach 69.1% by 2050.

The proportion of men makes up 48.85% and the proportion of women is 51.15%.

Ethnic Kazakhs make up 71%, Russians 14.9%, Uzbeks 3.3%, Ukrainians 1.9%, Uygur 1.5%, Germans 1.1%, Tatars 1.1%, and others 5.2%.

The first census in Kazakhstan was conducted under Russian Imperial rule in 1897, which estimated population at round 4 million people. Following censuses showed a growth until 1939, where numbers showed a decrease to 6,081 thousand relative to the previous census done 13 years earlier, due to famines of 1922 and 1933.

But since 1939 population has steadily increased to 16.5 million in 1989, according to corresponding year census. Official estimates indicate that the population continued to increase after 1989, peaking out at 17 million in 1993 and then declining to 15 million in the 1999 census. The downward trend continued through 2002, when the estimated population bottomed out at 14.9 million, and then resumed its growth. Significant numbers of Russians returned to Russia. Kazakhstan underwent significant urbanization during the first 50 years of the Soviet era, as the share of the rural population declined from more than 90% in the 1920s to less than 50% since the 1970s. The fertility rate declined to amongst the lower rates in the world in 1999 and increased to again amongst the higher rates in the world in 2021.

== Population size and structure ==
=== Population of Kazakhstan 1897–2024 ===
Year	Population (thousands)	Urban, %	Rural, %	Source
1897	4,000	—N/a	—N/a	census
1926	6,198	—N/a	—N/a	census
1939	6,081	28%	72%	census
1959	9,295	44%	56%	census
1970	13,001	50%	50%	census
1979	14,685	54%	46%	census
1989	16,537	57%	43%	census
1999	14,953	57%	43%	census
2009	15,982	54%	46%	census
2021	19,186	61%	39%	census
2024	20,182	63%	37%	estimate

Data sources: Population 1897 from Russian Empire Census. Population 1926 from First All-Union Census of the Soviet Union. Population 1939–1999 from demoscope.ru, 2002–2008 from Kazakhstan Statistical Agency web site. Rural/urban shares 1939–1993 from statistical yearbooks, print editions, 2002–2008 from Kazakhstan Statistical Agency web site. 2009–2014 from Kazakhstan Statistical Agency web site.

As of 2003, there were discrepancies between Western sources regarding the population of Kazakhstan. United States government sources, including the CIA World Factbook and the US Census Bureau International Data Base, listed the population as 15,340,533, while the World Bank gave a 2002 estimate of 14,858,948. This discrepancy was presumably due to difficulties in measurement caused by the large migratory population in Kazakhstan, emigration, and low population density – only about 5.5 persons per km^{2} in an area the size of Western Europe.

=== Structure of the population ===
Population Estimates by Sex and Age Group (01.VII.2021) (Data refer to resident population.):

Age Group	Male	Female	Total	%
Total	9 223 589	9 777 399	19 000 988	100
0	223 552	209 539	433 090	2.28
1–4	818 257	766 788	1 585 045	8.34
5–9	982 270	927 108	1 909 377	10.05
10–14	857 617	811 696	1 669 313	8.76
15–19	643 879	610 943	1 254 821	6.60
20–24	568 174	544 634	1 112 808	5.86
25–29	699 428	680 033	1 379 461	7.26
30–34	793 785	815 781	1 609 566	8.47
35–39	690 052	709 580	1 399 631	7.37
40–44	586 612	615 237	1 201 849	6.33
45–49	525 164	576 347	1 101 510	5.80
50–54	475 079	532 077	1 007 156	5.30
55–59	449 996	534 713	984 709	5.18
60–64	375 734	486 204	861 938	4.54
65–69	241 436	361 664	603 099	3.17
70–74	149 026	263 406	412 432	2.17
75–79	60 581	122 881	183 462	0.97
80–84	57 026	141 863	198 889	1.05
85–89	17 029	47 320	64 348	0.34
90–94	5 915	15 747	21 662	0.11
95–99	1 980	3 013	4 993	0.03
100+	1 002	831	1 832	0.01
Age group	Male	Female	Total	Percent
0–14	2 881 696	2 715 129	5 596 825	29.46
15–64	5 807 898	6 105 548	11 913 446	62.70
65+	533 995	956 722	1 490 717	7.84

Structure of the population (01.01.2021) (Estimates):

Age Group	Male	Female	Total	%
Total	9 160 399	9 719 153	18 879 552	100
0–15	2 980 297	2 809 236	5 789 533	30.7
16–62(59)	5 524 137	5 485 235	11 009 372	58.3
63(60)+	655 965	1 424 682	2 080 647	11.0

The age group under 15 is considered below the working age, while the age group over 63(60) is above the working age (63 years for men, 60 for women).

View source data.
View source data.

Chart definition page not found.

View source data.
View source data.

== Vital statistics ==
=== Births and deaths ===
Notable events in Kazakh demographics:

- 1991 – Dissolution of the Soviet Union

	Average population	Live births^{1}	Deaths^{1}	Natural change^{1}	Crude birth rate (per 1000)	Crude death rate (per 1000)	Natural change (per 1000)	Crude migration change (per 1000)	Fertility rates	Life expectancy
1950	6,703,000	254,169	79,005	175,164	37.9	11.8	26.1			
1951	6,946,000	272,354	80,553	191,801	39.2	11.6	27.6	8.7		
1952	7,133,000	265,235	85,241	179,994	37.2	12.0	25.2	1.7		
1953	7,271,000	262,758	73,930	188,828	36.1	10.2	26.0	-6.7		
1954	7,528,000	278,420	76,092	202,328	37.0	10.1	26.9	8.4		
1955	7,992,000	299,854	73,283	226,571	37.5	9.2	28.3	33.3		
1956	8,426,000	305,430	64,807	240,623	36.3	7.7	28.6	25.7		
1957	8,722,000	326,766	68,050	258,716	37.5	7.8	29.7	5.4		
1958	9,077,000	336,020	62,680	273,340	37.0	6.9	30.1	10.6		
1959	9,516,000	349,794	69,602	280,192	36.8	7.3	29.4	19.0		
1960	9,996,000	372,595	65,667	306,928	37.2	6.6	30.7	19.7		
1961	10,480,000	377,789	68,610	309,179	36.1	6.5	29.5	18.9		
1962	10,958,000	369,002	70,952	298,050	33.7	6.5	27.2	18.4		
1963	11,321,000	346,084	67,218	278,866	30.6	5.9	24.6	8.5		
1964	11,610,000	324,412	66,197	258,215	27.9	5.7	22.2	3.3		
1965	11,909,000	314,533	69,803	244,730	26.4	5.9	20.6	5.2		
1966	12,185,000	307,905	69,402	238,503	25.3	5.7	19.6	3.6		
1967	12,456,000	301,715	71,824	229,891	24.2	5.8	18.5	3.7		
1968	12,694,000	296,882	73,496	223,386	23.4	5.8	17.6	1.5		
1969	12,901,000	297,129	78,660	218,469	23.0	6.1	16.9	-0.6		
1970	13,106,000	301,451	77,619	223,832	23.0	5.9	17.1	-1.2		
1971	13,321,000	317,423	79,881	237,542	23.8	6.0	17.8	-1.4		
1972	13,534,000	318,551	85,122	233,429	23.5	6.3	17.2	-1.2		
1973	13,742,000	321,075	90,282	230,793	23.4	6.6	16.8	-1.4		
1974	13,955,000	338,291	93,582	244,709	24.2	6.7	17.5	-2.0		
1975	14,136,000	343,668	101,865	241,803	24.3	7.2	17.1	-4.1		
1976	14,279,000	350,362	103,892	246,470	24.5	7.3	17.3	-7.2		
1977	14,425,000	349,379	105,376	244,003	24.2	7.3	16.9	-6.7		
1978	14,589,000	355,337	107,293	248,044	24.4	7.4	17.0	-5.6		
1979	14,743,000	354,320	113,687	240,633	24.0	7.7	16.3	-5.7		
1980	14,884,000	356,013	119,078	236,935	23.9	8.0	15.9	-6.3		
1981	15,033,000	367,950	120,974	246,976	24.5	8.0	16.4	-6.4		
1982	15,185,000	373,416	120,165	253,251	24.6	7.9	16.7	-6.6		
1983	15,334,000	378,577	123,807	254,770	24.7	8.1	16.6	-6.8		
1984	15,481,000	399,403	129,796	269,607	25.8	8.4	17.4	-7.8	3.04	
1985	15,623,000	396,929	126,786	270,143	25.4	8.1	17.3	-8.1	3.02	
1986	15,776,000	410,846	119,149	291,697	26.0	7.6	18.5	-8.7	3.13	
1987	15,948,000	417,139	122,835	294,304	26.2	7.7	18.5	-7.6	3.19	
1988	16,188,000	407,116	126,898	280,218	25.3	7.9	17.4	-2.4	3.13	
1989	16,243,000	382,269	126,378	255,891	23.5	7.8	15.8	-12.4	2.81	
1990	16,328,000	362,081	128,576	233,505	22.2	7.9	14.3	-9.1	2.72	
1991	16,405,000	353,174	134,324	218,850	21.5	8.2	13.3	-8.6	2.67	
1992	16,439,000	337,612	137,518	200,094	20.5	8.4	12.2	-10.1	2.62	
1993	16,381,000	315,482	156,070	159,412	19.3	9.5	9.7	-13.2	2.54	
1994	16,146,000	305,624	160,339	145,285	18.9	9.9	9.0	-23.3	2.43	
1995	15,816,000	276,125	168,656	107,469	17.5	10.7	6.8	-27.2	2.21	
1996	15,578,000	253,175	166,028	87,147	16.3	10.7	5.6	-20.6	2.02	
1997	15,334,000	232,356	160,138	72,218	15.2	10.4	4.7	-20.4	1.93	
1998	15,072,000	222,380	154,314	68,066	14.8	10.2	4.5	-21.6	1.81	
1999	14,939,000	217,578	147,416	70,162	14.6	9.9	4.7	-13.5	1.80	65.6
2000	14,883,626	222,054	149,778	72,276	14.9	10.1	4.9	-8.6	1.88	65.5
2001	14,858,335	221,487	147,876	73,611	14.9	9.9	5.0	-6.7	1.84	65.8
2002	14,858,948	227,171	149,381	77,790	15.3	10.1	5.2	-5.2	1.88	66.0
2003	14,909,018	247,946	155,277	92,669	16.6	10.4	6.2	-2.8	2.03	65.8
2004	15,012,985	273,028	152,250	120,778	18.2	10.1	8.1	-1.1	2.21	66.2
2005	15,147,029	278,977	157,121	121,856	18.4	10.4	8.1	0.8	2.22	65.9
2006	15,308,084	301,756	157,210	144,546	19.7	10.3	9.4	1.2	2.36	66.2
2007	15,484,192	321,963	158,297	163,666	20.8	10.2	10.6	0.9	2.47	66.3
2008	15,674,000	357,555	152,878	204,677	22.8	9.8	13.0	-0.7	2.68	67.1
2009	16,092,822	356,261	142,883	213,378	22.1	8.9	13.3	13.4	2.55	68.4
2010	16,321,872	367,707	146,027	221,680	22.5	9.0	13.6	0.6	2.59	68.5
2011	16,557,201	372,690	144,323	228,367	22.5	8.7	13.8	0.6	2.59	68.7
2012	16,792,089	381,153	143,411	237,742	22.7	8.5	14.2	0	2.62	69.5
2013	17,035,550	387,256	136,368	250,888	22.7	8.0	14.7	-0.2	2.64	70.6
2014	17,288,285	399,309	132,287	267,022	23.1	7.7	15.5	-0.7	2.73	71.4
2015	17,542,806	398,458	130,811	267,647	22.7	7.5	15.3	-0.6	2.74	72.0
2016	17,794,055	400,694	131,231	269,463	22.5	7.4	15.2	-0.9	2.77	72.4
2017	18,037,775	390,262	129,009	261,253	21.6	7.2	14.5	-0.8	2.75	73.0
2018	18,276,452	397,799	130,448	267,351	21.8	7.1	14.6	-1.4	2.84	73.2
2019	18,513,673	402,310	133,128	269,182	21.7	7.2	14.5	-1.5	2.90	73.2
2020	18,755,665	426,824	161,333	265,491	22.8	8.6	14.2	-1.1	3.13	71.4
2021	19,000,987	446,491	182,403	264,088	23.5	9.6	13.9	-0.8	3.32	70.2
2022	19,634,983	403,893	133,523	270,370	20.6	6.8	13.8	19.6	3.05	74.4
2023	19,900,325	388,428	130,686	257,742	19.5	6.6	13.0	0.5	2.96	75.1
2024	20,159,963	365,923	132,900	233,078	18.2	6.6	11.6	0.9	2.80	75.4
2025	20,495,975	335,005	134,735	200,270	16.4	6.6	9.8	6.8	2.53	76.0
2026		305,000(e)							2.27 (e)	

^{1} Births and deaths until 1979 are estimates.

=== Current vital statistics ===
Period	Live births	Deaths	Natural increase
January—September 2025	249,312	97,680	+151,632
January—September 2026	226,990	98,687	+128,303
Difference	▼ –22,322 (-8.95%)	▲ +1,007 (+1.03%)	▼ –23,329

=== Fertility ===
==== Crude birth rates and total fertility rates by region in 2025 ====
Total Fertility Rate of Kazakhstan by region (2021)

Region	CBR	TFR
Kazakhstan	16.43	2.57
Abai	13.70	2.66
Aqmola	11.63	1.99
Aqtöbe	16.82	2.68
Almaty	18.08	3.09
Atyrau	19.51	3.05
Batys Qazaqstan	14.68	2.46
Jambyl	18.19	3.12
Jetısu	15.77	2.88
Qarağandy	12.25	2.00
Qostanai	10.02	1.68
Qyzylorda	19.91	3.43
Mañğystau	21.40	3.32
Pavlodar	11.32	1.96
Soltüstık Qazaqstan	8.98	1.63
Türkıstan	22.22	3.86
Ūlytau	16.17	2.76
Şyğys Qazaqstan	10.52	1.97
Astana city	17.31	2.06
Almaty city	13.91	1.71
Şymkent city	21.76	3.02

Thus it can be seen that fertility rate is higher in more traditionalist and religious south and west, and lower in the north and east, where the percentage of Slavic and German population is still relatively high.

According to the Kazakhstan Demographic and Health Survey in 1999, the TFR for Kazakhs was 2.5 and that for Russians was 1.38. TFR in 1989 for Kazakhs & Russians were 3.58 and 2.24 respectively.

Year	Kazakh women	Russian women	Ukrainian women	Uzbek women
1989	3.58	2.24	—N/a	—N/a
1995	3.11	1.69	—N/a	—N/a
1999	2.50	1.38	—N/a	—N/a
2000	2.12	1.18	1.60	2.90
2001	2.11	1.17	1.59	2.92
2002	2.14	1.21	1.60	2.88
2003	2.30	1.30	1.71	3.10
2004	2.52	1.36	1.76	3.39
2005	2.54	1.35	1.73	3.32
2006	2.73	1.38	1.80	3.43

==== Before 1950 ====
Years	1896	1897	1898	1899	1900	1901	1902	1903	1904	1905
Total Fertility Rate in Kazakhstan	6.44	6.44	6.43	6.42	6.42	6.41	6.40	6.40	6.39	6.38

Years	1906	1907	1908	1909	1910	1911	1912	1913	1914	1915
Total Fertility Rate in Kazakhstan	6.38	6.37	6.36	6.36	6.35	6.34	6.34	6.33	6.32	6.32

Years	1916	1917	1918	1919	1920	1921	1922	1923	1924	1925
Total Fertility Rate in Kazakhstan	6.31	6.30	6.30	6.29	6.28	6.28	6.27	6.26	6.26	6.25

Years	1926	1927	1928	1929	1930	1931	1932	1933	1934	1935
Total Fertility Rate in Kazakhstan	6.20	6.15	6.10	6.05	6.00	5.95	5.90	5.85	5.80	5.75

Years	1936	1937	1938	1939	1940	1941	1942	1943	1944	1945
Total Fertility Rate in Kazakhstan	5.71	5.66	5.61	5.56	5.51	5.39	5.27	5.15	5.03	4.91

Years	1946	1947	1948	1949
Total Fertility Rate in Kazakhstan	4.78	4.66	4.54	4.42

=== Life expectancy at birth ===
Life expectancy in Kazakhstan since 1868

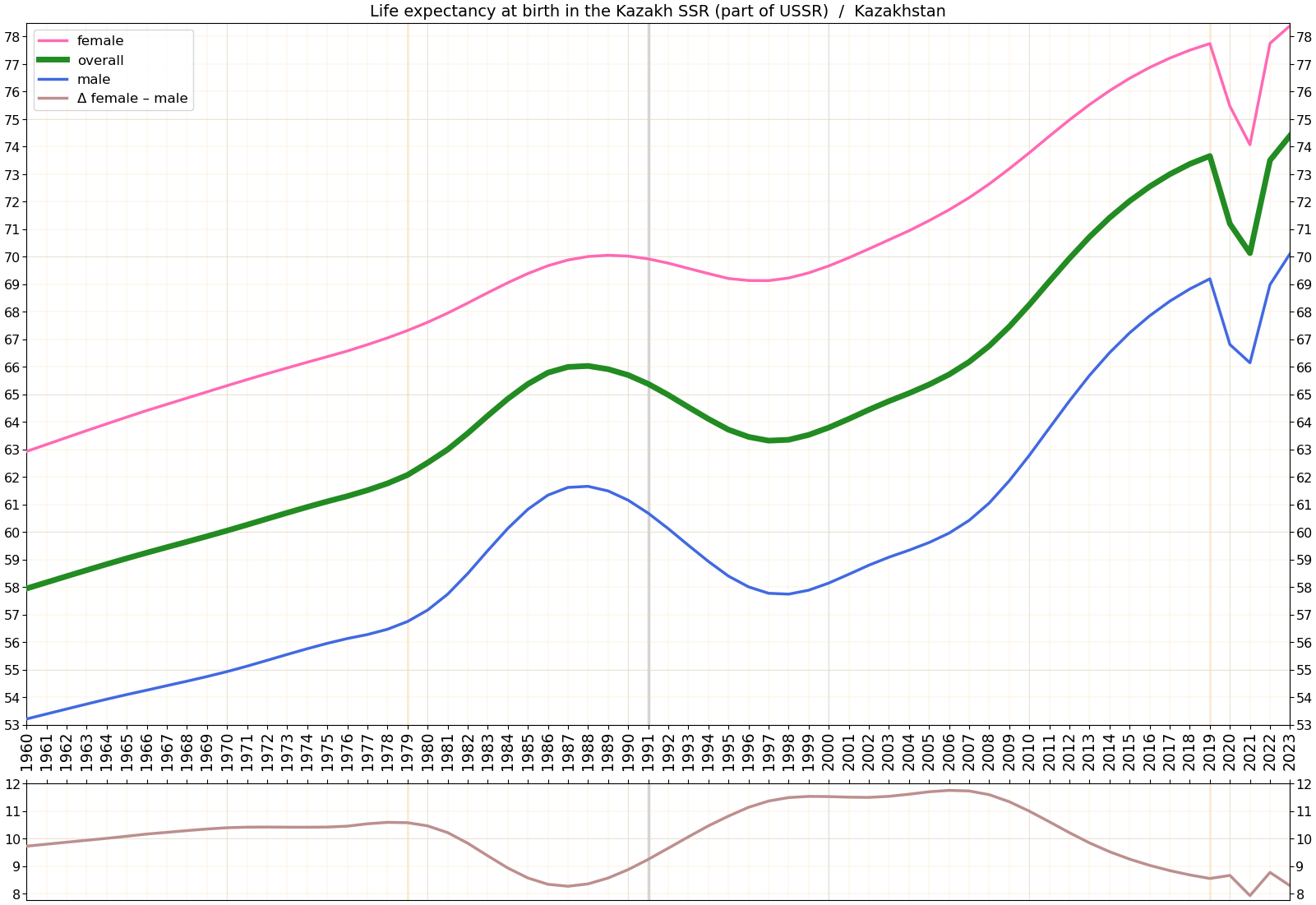
Life expectancy in Kazakhstan since 1960 by gender

Kazakhstan has a life expectancy of 75.97 years in 2025, a number that has recorded steady growth since around 2005 when it was almost 66 years. However, the difference between men and women (almost 8 years) is quite higher than most countries, even though it is declining compared to almost 12 years in 2007. The high consumption of alcohol between men is considered as a factor, as is the lack of adequate medical infrastructure in areas who are remote from major cities. The economic improvement of Kazakhstan since 2000, and targeted state programs to improve the quality of life, medical services and access to them are among the reason for the high growth of life expectancy.

The life expectancy in Kazakhstan varies from region to region, reaching almost 79 to 80 years in Almaty and Astana, while people in urban areas live slightly more than the rural ones. It has been also been observed that the life expectancy in the regions whose economy is more dependent on manufacturing and the extraction of natural resources is lower than regions and cities whose economy is more dependent in the services sector or the public sector.

According to a 2025 study, environmental and production factors are also responsible for the regional differences of the life expectancy in Kazakhstan. The main factors where the gender difference of life expectancy is attributed are cardiovascular and oncological diseases that affect the adult population, alcohol consumption in men and external causes of death (suicides, injuries, accidents), while the living conditions in some areas and ethnic variations in mortality rates (like higher mortality rates among Russian Kazaihstanis) are also other factors.

According to QazStat, the Kazakhstani State Statistics agency, the life expectancy of Kazakhstan has increased from 65 years in 1999 to almost 76 in 2026, as shown below:

Year	Life expectancy (men)	Life expectancy (women)	Difference	Life expectancy (total)
1999	60.58	70.87	10.29	65.63
2000	60.15	71.13	10.98	65.50
2001	60.50	71.32	10.82	65.80
2002	60.70	71.52	10.82	66.00
2003	60.52	71.46	10.94	65.83
2004	60.62	72.00	11.38	66.18
2005	60.30	71.77	11.47	65.91
2006	60.67	72.15	11.48	66.15
2007	60.70	72.58	11.88	66.34
2008	61.91	72.43	10.52	67.11
2009	63.55	73.24	9.69	68.38
2010	63.54	73.41	9.87	68.44
2011	64.22	73.88	9.66	69.01
2012	64.72	74.28	9.56	69.50
2013	65.89	75.23	9.34	70.60
2014	66.91	75.82	8.89	71.43
2015	67.50	76.24	8.74	71.93
2016	67.97	76.55	8.58	72.32
2017	68.98	76.96	7.98	73.01
2018	69.30	77.31	8.01	73.35
2019	69.21	77.47	8.26	73.39
2020	67.36	75.61	8.25	71.51
2021	66.64	74.07	7.43	70.38
2022	70.27	78.42	8.15	74.45
2023	70.99	79.06	8.07	75.10
2024	71.33	79.42	8.09	75.44
2025	72.19	79.80	7.61	75.97

== Migration ==
Net migration in Kazakhstan (2015–2024)
Year	Arrivals	Departures	Net migration
2015	16,581	30,047	-13,466
2016	13,755	34,900	-21,145
2017	15,595	37,725	-22,130
2018	12,747	41,868	-29,121
2019	12,255	45,225	-32,970
2020	11,370	29,088	-17,718
2021	11,039	32,256	-21,217
2022	17,425	24,147	-6,722
2023	25,387	16,094	9,293
2024	29,282	12,732	16,550

== Ethnic groups ==
Ethnic groups in Kazakhstan (2026)
Ethnic groups
Kazakh	71.5%
Russian	14.4%
Uzbek	3.4%
Ukrainian	1.8%
Uyghur	1.5%
German	1.1%
Tatar	1.1%
Other	5.2%

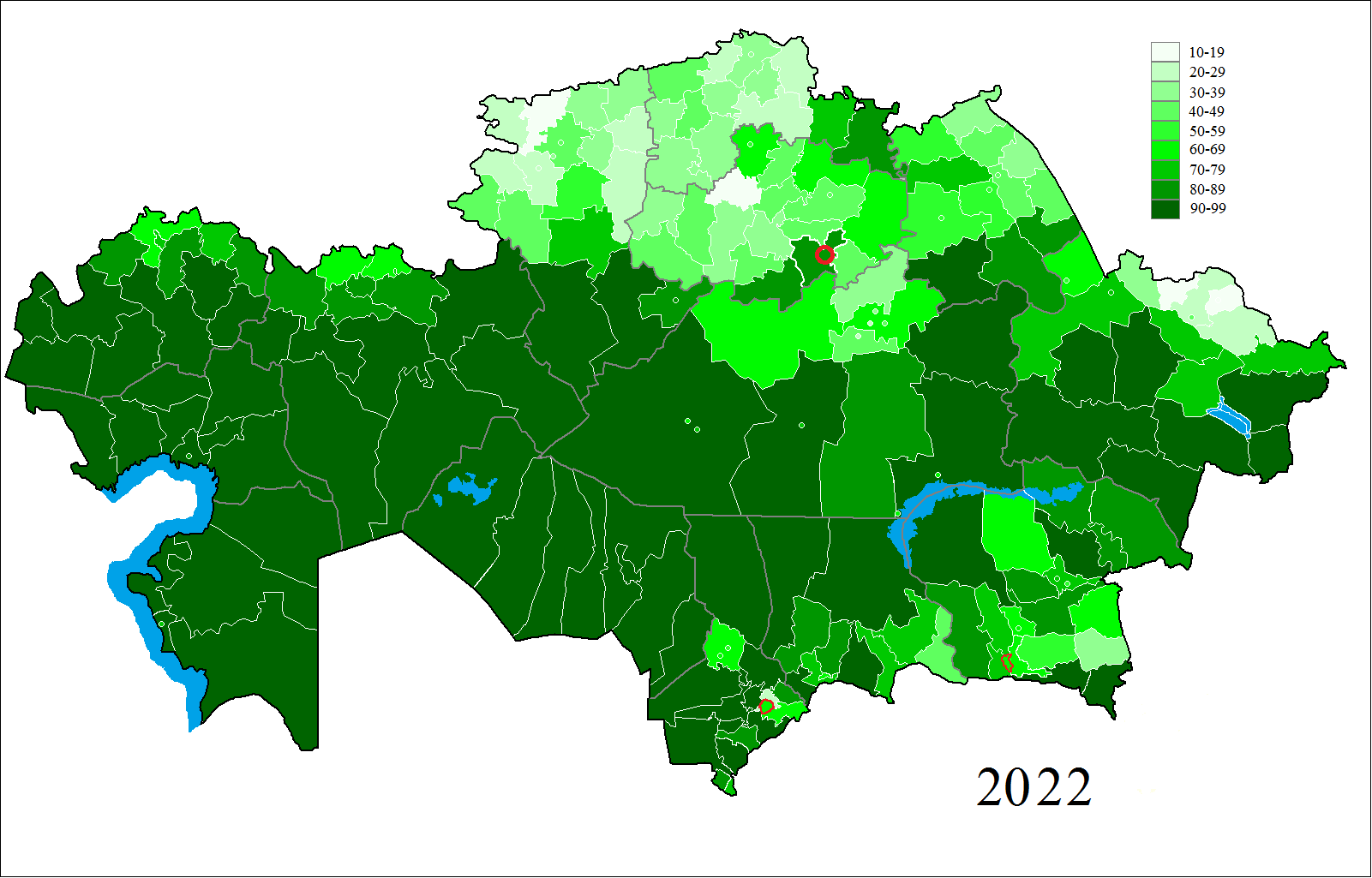
The share of Kazakhs in Kazakhstan by districts at the beginning of 2022

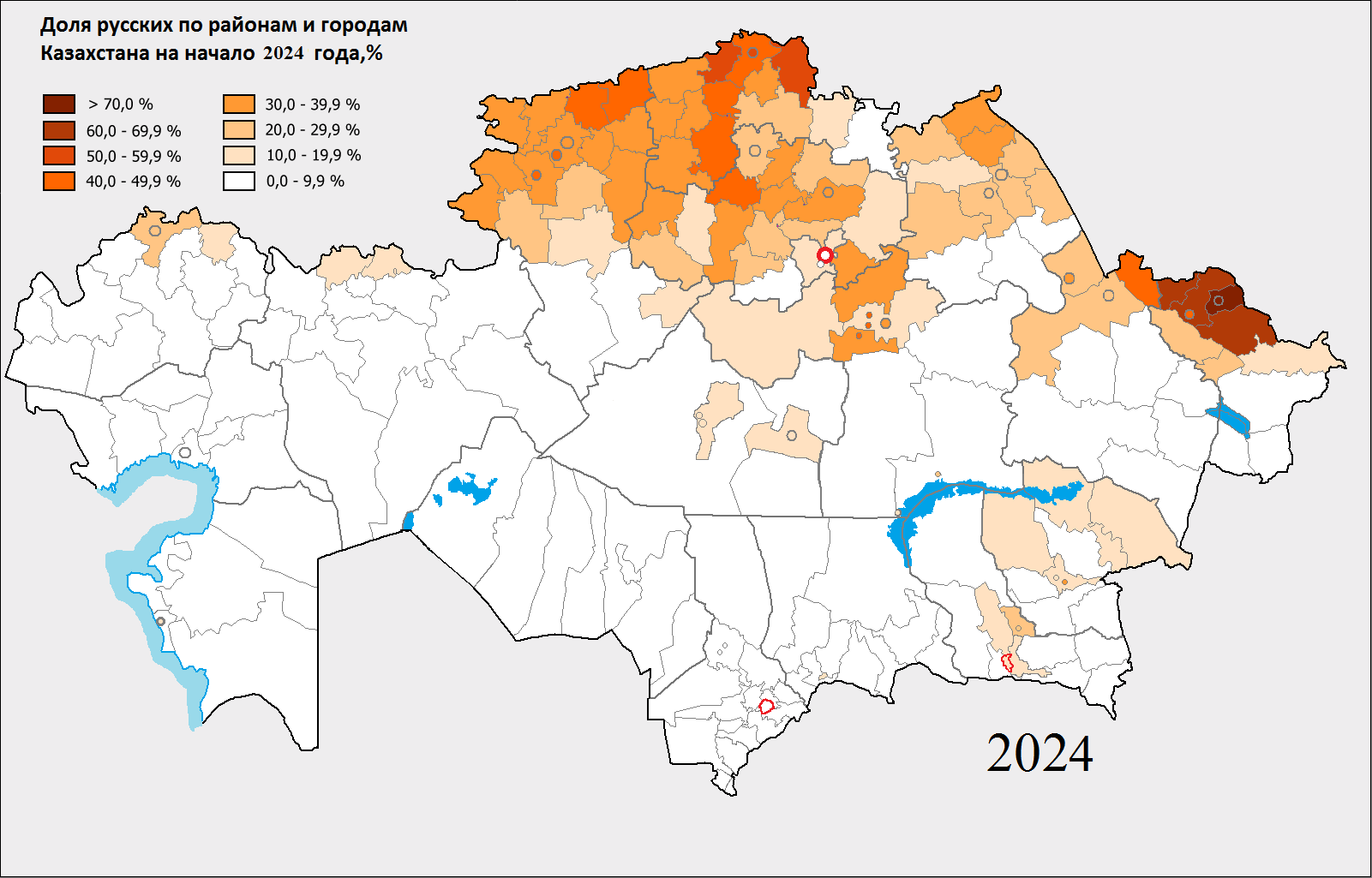
The share Russians by districts and cities of regional and republican subordination Kazakhstan in 2021

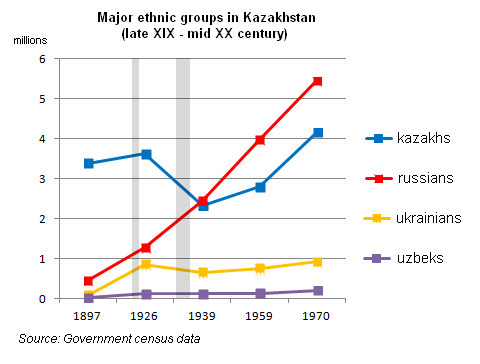
Kazakhstan demographics 1897–1970. Major ethnic groups. Famines marked in grey.

Kazakhstan's dominant ethnic group, the Kazakhs, traces its origins to the 15th century, when after the disintegration of Golden Horde, numbers of Turkic and Turco-Mongol tribes united to establish the Kazakh Khanate. With a cohesive culture and national identity, they constituted an absolute majority on the land until colonization by the Russian empire.

Russian advances into the territory of Kazakhstan began in the late 18th century, when the Kazakhs nominally accepted Russian rule in exchange for protection against repeated attacks by the western Mongolian Kalmyks. In the 1890s, Russian peasants began to settle on the fertile lands of northern Kazakhstan, causing many Kazakhs to move eastwards into Chinese territory in search of new grazing grounds. The 1906 completion of the Trans-Aral Railway between Orenburg and Tashkent further facilitated Russian colonization.

The first collective farms were formed in Kazakhstan in 1921, populated primarily by Russians and Soviet deportees. In 1930, as part of the first Five Year Plan, the Soviet Government decreed measures of force sedentarization of nomads and their incorporation into collectivized farms. This movement resulted in devastating famines of the 1920s and of the 1930s, claiming the lives of an estimated 40% of ethnic Kazakhs (1.5 million), between 1930 and 1933. Hundreds of thousands also fled to China, Iran and Afghanistan. The famine made Kazakhs a minority of the population of Kazakhstan, and only after the republic gained independence in 1991 did Kazakhs have a slim demographic majority within Kazakhstan.

Demographics did shift in the 1950s and 1960s, when, as part of Nikita Khrushchev's Virgin Lands Campaign, hundreds of thousands of Soviet citizens relocated to the Kazakh steppes in order to farm. As recognized in the 1959 census, the Kazaks became the second-largest ethnic group in Kazakhstan for the first time in recorded history, comprising just 30% of the total population of Kazakhstan. Russians numbered 42.7%.

Since the Soviet Union's collapse, the numbers of members of European ethnic groups has been falling and Asian groups have been continuously rising. According to 2026 estimates, the ethnic composition of Kazakhstan was approximately: 71.5% Kazakh, 14.4% Russian, 3.4% Uzbek, 1.8% Ukrainian, 1.5% Uyghur, 1.1% Tatar, 1.1% German, and <1% Korean, Turkish, Azerbaijani, Belarusian, Dungan, Kurdish, Tajik, Polish, Kyrgyz, Chechen. According to 2021 Census, composition of child population was 79% Kazakh and 9.1% Russian.

== Religion ==
Religion in Kazakhstan, 2021
Islam	69.3%
Christianity	17.2%
No Response	11.01%
Atheism	2.25%
Other religions	0.2%

== Bibliography ==
- Rasuly-Paleczek, Gabriele; Katschnig, Julia (2005), Central Asia on Display: Proceedings of the VIIth Conference of the European Society for Central Asian Studies, LIT Verlag Münster, ISBN 978-3-8258-8309-6.
