= History of the Jews in Kazakhstan =

The location of Kazakhstan (dark green) in Eurasia

== Jewish history in Kazakhstan ==
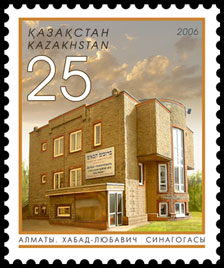
Chabad-Lubavitch synagogue in Almaty as depicted on a 2006 Kazakh postal stamp.

General Secretary Joseph Stalin evacuated thousands of Ashkenazi Jews from other parts of the Soviet Union to the Kazakh SSR. During the Holocaust 8,218 Jews were evacuated to Kazakhstan between August 1941 and January 1942. Some Bukharan Jews, Mountain Jews, Georgian Jews, and Iranian Jews also lived in Kazakhstan.

A Chabad-Lubavitch synagogue in Almaty is named after Rabbi Levi Yitzchak Schneerson, father of the Rebbe, who is buried at the city's cemetery, close to the synagogue. Levi Yitzchak Schneerson was exiled to Kazakhstan from Ukraine, Dnepropetrovsk, where he was a chief rabbi. Lubavitcher Jews from all over the world come to pray at his grave.

Yeshaya E. Cohen, the Chief Rabbi of Kazakhstan, and leader of the Alliance of Rabbis in Islamic States told Kazinform on January 16, 2004, that a new synagogue would be built in Astana. He thanked President Nazarbayev for "paying so much attention to distinguishing between those who truly believe and those who want to hijack their religion." President of the Euro-Asian Jewish Congress, presented Nazarbayev with a menorah on 7 September 2004.

== Historical demographics ==
Kazakhstan's Jewish population rapidly increased between 1926 and 1959, being almost eight times larger in 1959 than in 1926. Kazakhstan's Jewish population slowly declined between 1959 and 1989, followed by a much larger decline after the fall of Communism between 1989 and 2002 due to massive Jewish emigration, mostly to Israel.

Historical Kazakh Jewish population
Year	Pop.	±%
1926	3,548	—
1939	19,240	+442.3%
1959	28,085	+46.0%
1970	27,676	−1.5%
1979	23,601	−14.7%
1989	20,104	−14.8%
1999	6,823	−66.1%
2009	3,578	−47.6%
2019	4,064	+13.6%
Source: (Note: The Jewish population data includes Mountain Jews, Georgian Jews, Bukharan Jews (or Central Asian Jews), Krymchaks (all per the 1959 Soviet census), and Tats. It does not include Karaim (adherents of Karaite Judaism), of which there were 231 in 2009.)

Jewish Kazakh fencer Yakov Rylsky (1928–1999) was a Soviet Olympic and world champion sabre fencer.

== Jewish life today ==
At present, there are several thousand Jews in Kazakhstan, most of whom are Ashkenazi Jews.

There are estimated to be approximately four dozen Persian Jewish families living in Kazakhstan, which call themselves Lakhloukh and speak Aramaic. They still hold identity papers from Iran, the country their ancestors left almost 80 years ago. These Persian Jews lived near the border of Iran and commonly practiced trade to sustain their communities. The most popular Lakhloukh Jewish family being the Malihi family, whom are all descendants of Jaha Malihi (A noble in the Persian Empire).

There are synagogues and large Jewish communities in Almaty where there are 1,000 Jews in Astana and Pavlodar. Most of the Neo-Aramaic speaking Jews of Salmas now reside in Almaty. There are smaller communities in Karaganda, Shymkent, Semey, Kokshetau, Taraz, Oral, Aktobe, and Petropavl.

There are twenty Jewish Kazakh organizations, including the Mitzvah Association, Chabad, the American Jewish Joint Distribution Committee, Jewish Agency for Israel, and the All-Kazakhstan Jewish Congress (AKJC). The Jewish communities formed the AKJC in December 1999 in a ceremony attended by Kazakh government officials and United States Ambassador to Kazakhstan, Richard Jones.

There are fourteen Jewish day schools attended by more than 700 students. There is a Jewish kindergarten in Almaty. Between 2005 and 2006 attendance in religious services and education in Almaty among Jews greatly increased. The government of Kazakhstan registered eight foreign rabbis and "Jewish missionaries". It has also donated buildings and land for the building of new synagogues.

According to the National Coalition Supporting Soviet Jewry, "Antisemitism is not prevalent in Kazakhstan and rare incidents are reported in the press," contrary to incorrect perceptions in popular culture caused by the country's portrayal in the 2006 film Borat as a "hot-bed of Antisemitism."

== Notable Kazakh Jews ==
- Vadim Alekseyev (born 1970), Olympic breaststroke swimmer
- Boris Avrukh (born 1978), chess grandmaster, author, and businessman
- Larisa Bergen (1949–2023), Olympic silver medalist volleyball player
- Ziv Berkovich (born 1984), cinematographer and screenwriter.
- Max Birbraer (born 1980), professional ice hockey forward
- Mark Gurman (born 1989), professional association football player
- David Loriya (born 1981), football goalkeeper
- Timur Rudoselsky (born 1994), professional footballer
- Eduard Vinokurov (1942–2010), Olympic champion and world champion sabre fencer

== See also ==
- History of the Jews in Central Asia
- Israel–Kazakhstan relations
- Ashkenazi Jews
- Christianity in Kazakhstan
- Hinduism in Kazakhstan
- Islam in Kazakhstan
- Roman Catholicism in Kazakhstan
- Baptist Union of Kazakhstan
