= Freedom of religion in Kazakhstan =

The 2021 census noted that Kazakhstan is 69.31% Muslim, 17.19% Christian, 11.25% other religious beliefs and 2.25% no religious belief.

== World rankings ==
In 2023, the country was scored 1 out of 4 for religious freedom. It was noted that legal amendments in 2022 placed extra restrictions on citizens holding religious meetings in unregistered places of worship; it was also noted that authorities had detained 75 alleged Tablighi Jamaat Muslims between 2015 and 2022.

In the same year, the country was ranked as the 48th worst place in the world to be a Christian.

The Constitution of Kazakhstan provides for freedom of religion, and the various religious communities worship largely without government interference. Local officials attempt on occasion to limit the practice of religion by some nontraditional groups; however, higher-level officials or courts occasionally intervene to correct such attempts.

The government's enforcement of previously amended laws led to increased problems for some unregistered groups. As of 2007, the law on religion continues to impose mandatory registration requirements on missionaries and religious organizations. Most religious groups, including those of minority and nontraditional denominations, reported that the religion laws did not materially affect religious activities. Unregistered religious groups experienced an increase in the level of fines imposed for nonregistration in addition to stronger efforts to collect such fines. Most registered groups experienced no problems, but the Hare Krishna movement, a registered group, suffered the demolition of 25 homes as part of the Karasai local government's campaign to seize title to its land based on alleged violations of property laws.

The population maintained its long tradition of secularism and tolerance. In particular, Muslim, Russian Orthodox, Roman Catholic, and Jewish leaders reported high levels of acceptance in society. During the reporting period, the dominant Islamic and Russian Orthodox leaders publicly criticized a number of nontraditional religious groups. The number of registered religious groups and places of worship increased during 2007 for virtually all religious groups, including minority and nontraditional groups.

The U.S. government discusses religious freedom issues with the Kazakhstan government as part of its overall policy to promote human rights. The ambassador and other U.S. officials supported the country's efforts to increase links and mutual understanding among religious groups. U.S. officials engaged in private and public dialogue at all levels to urge that proposed amendments to the religion laws are consistent with the country's constitutional guarantees of religious freedom and with the country's tradition of religious tolerance. U.S. government officials visited religious facilities, met with religious leaders, and worked with government officials to address specific cases of concern. During 2007, the Embassy sponsored exchange programs for leaders of various religious groups to meet with a diverse range of counterparts in the United States. Embassy officials maintained an ongoing dialogue with a broad range of groups within the religious community.

== Religious tolerance ==
Kazakhstan supports international efforts for promoting inter-religious dialogue and tolerance. Every four years, Astana (the capital of Kazakhstan) hosts the Congress of Leaders of World and Traditional Religions is housed in the iconic Pyramid of Peace and Accord. The congress assembles religious leaders from all corners of the world to discuss, debate, and exchange views on theology, society and politics. Launched in 2003, the fourth Congress was held May 30–31, 2012 to discuss the role of religion and inter-religious dialogue in promoting global security and human development. Kazakhstan's hosting of the Congress, in the words of analyst Roman Muzalevsky, "places obligations on the government to ensure a tolerant co-existence of ethnic groups and a favorable environment for religious associations." The 2006 Congress gathered 45 delegations, while the 2012 Congress assembled a record 350 delegates from forty countries. President Nazarbayev has expressed his desire to continue this tradition.

== Status of religious freedom ==
=== Legal and policy framework ===
The Constitution of Kazakhstan provides for freedom of religion, and religious groups worshiped largely without government interference; however, local and regional officials attempted, on occasion, to limit or control the practice of religion by several groups, especially nontraditional religious communities. The Constitution defines the country as a secular state and provides the right to decline religious affiliation. The government continued to express publicly its support for religious tolerance and diversity.

The government's religion laws narrow the legal protections of religious freedom found in the Constitution. The laws were amended in 2005 to reinforce registration requirements and clarify that religious groups must register with both the central government and the local governments of individual regions (oblasts) in which they have congregations. Prior to these amendments, the government required religious organizations to register only if they wished to be accorded legal status in order to buy or rent property, hire employees, or engage in other legal transactions. Although the amended national religion laws explicitly require religious organizations to register with the government, it continues to provide that all persons are free to practice their religion "alone or together with others." To register, a religious organization must have at least ten members and submit an application to the Ministry of Justice (MOJ).

The government may deny registration based upon an insufficient number of adherents or inconsistencies between the provisions of a religious organization's charter and the law. In addition, under the Law on Public Associations, a registered organization, including a religious group, may have all activities suspended by court order for a period of three to six months for defiance of the Constitution or laws or for systematic pursuit of activities that contradict the charter and bylaws of the organization as registered. Police, procurators, and citizens may petition a court to suspend the activities of a registered organization for failure to rectify violations or for repeated violations of the law. During a suspension, the organization concerned is prohibited from speaking with the media on behalf of the organization; holding meetings, gatherings, or services; and undertaking financial transactions other than meeting ongoing contractual obligations such as paying salaries.

In practice, most religious communities choose to register with the government and are ultimately successful in obtaining registration. Nontraditional religious groups sometimes reported long delays in the process. When refusing or significantly delaying registration, the government usually claimed that religious groups' charters did not meet the requirements of the law, in some cases citing discrepancies between Russian and Kazakh language versions of a group's charter or referring a charter for expert examination. Officials in Northern Kazakhstan and Atyrau oblasts were cited by several groups as being resistant to working with nontraditional groups seeking registration.

Administrative Code Article 375 allows authorities to suspend the activities and fine the leaders of unregistered groups; Article 374-1, a related provision added to the Administrative Code by the July 2005 national security amendments, carries significantly heavier fines than Article 375. Local authorities have broad discretion in determining whether to file charges for unregistered religious activity under Article 375 or 374-1. Local governments unevenly applied these laws during the reporting period.

The Religious Issues Committee (RIC), which operates within the MOJ, serves as a liaison between religious groups and the government. In addition, the RIC serves as a consultative body within the MOJ to facilitate the registration of religious groups. The RIC also provides expert testimony to courts on religious issues, reviews religious materials obtained by law enforcement officials in their investigations, and coordinates with law enforcement officials to monitor compliance with the registration requirements.

As in previous years, government officials frequently expressed concern regarding the potential spread of political extremism and religious extremism in the country. The National Security Committee (KNB) has characterized the fight against "religious extremism" as a top priority of the internal intelligence service. An extremism law that came into effect in February 2005 applies to religious groups and other organizations. Under this law, the government has broad latitude in identifying and designating a group as an extremist organization, banning a designated group's activities, and criminalizing membership in a banned organization. By the end of the reporting period, the Hizb ut-Tahrir (HT) political movement remained the only group banned under the law. No apolitical religious organizations in the country had been outlawed as extremist.

The elections law prohibits political parties based upon ethnic, gender, or religious affiliation.

The Spiritual Association of Muslims of Kazakhstan (SAMK), a national organization with close ties to the government, is headed by the chief Mufti in Almaty and exercises significant influence over the practice of Islam in the country, including the construction of mosques. The SAMK is the primary coordinator of hajj travel and authorizes travel agencies to provide hajj travel services to citizens. Religious observers reported that the SAMK occasionally pressured nonaligned imams and congregations to join the SAMK to ensure liturgical orthodoxy. Notwithstanding SAMK influence and pressure, during the reporting period, the government registered some mosques and Muslim communities unaffiliated with the SAMK.

Neither law nor regulation prohibits foreign missionary activity. Foreign missionaries, like all visitors, are required to register with the migration police and indicate the purpose of their stay. Local and foreign missionaries are also required to register annually with the MOJ and provide information on religious affiliation, territory of missionary work, and time period for conducting that work. All literature and other materials to be used to support missionary work must be provided with the registration application; use of materials not vetted during the registration process is illegal. In addition a missionary must produce registration documents from the sponsoring religious organization and power of attorney from the sponsoring organization to be allowed to work on its behalf. The MOJ may refuse registration to missionaries whose work would be inconsistent with the law, including laws prohibiting the incitement of interethnic or interreligious hatred. The Constitution requires foreign religious associations to conduct their activities, including appointing the heads of religious associations, "in coordination with appropriate state institutions." Foreigners are permitted under the law to register religious organizations; however, the government requires that the majority of the ten founders of the organization be local citizens.

The government does not permit religious instruction in public schools. Homeschooling is permitted only for children at the preschool level, for noncitizen children, for children who want an accelerated curriculum, and for children who cannot attend public schools for family or health reasons. Homeschooled children must take intermediate and public exams at a public school. Parents may enroll children in supplemental religious education classes provided by registered religious organizations.

Under the national religion law, religious training of a child shall not cause damage to a child's all-around development or physical or moral health. The laws do not clarify how such damage should be assessed or which agency would make such a determination. Current educational licensing regulations do not permit religious groups to educate children without approval from the Ministry of Education. In accordance with the regulations, a religious organization whose charter includes provisions for religious education may be denied registration if it does not obtain approval from the Ministry of Education.

The government exempted registered religious organizations from taxes on both church collections and income from certain religious activities. However, congregations are required to pay for services such as fire company protection for religious buildings. The government has donated buildings, land, and provided other assistance for the construction of new mosques, synagogues, and Russian Orthodox churches.

Procurators have the right to inspect annually all organizations registered with state bodies; there were few reports that these inspections, when they occurred, were overly intrusive or were considered harassment. Where religious groups operated as legal entities, such as by running collective farms and restaurants or operating orphanages, authorities conducted health, sanitation, and other inspections relevant to the nature of the entities' operations. Authorities conducted public safety inspections of premises used for religious worship to ensure compliance with building and fire codes. These inspections also provided authorities with information about the registration status of the groups being inspected.

=== Restrictions ===
No apolitical religious groups are banned in Kazakhstan.

The Hizb ut-Tahrir (HT) Islamist political movement remained banned under the extremism law. Because it is primarily a political organization, albeit one motivated by religious ideology, and because it does not condemn terrorist acts by other groups, authorities' actions to restrict Hizb ut-Tahrir and prosecute its members are not a restriction on religious freedom per se.

The government remains wary of religious extremism and actively discourages affiliation with extremist groups. However, human rights observers and members of some minority religious groups criticized the government's often broad definition of extremism and its efforts to discourage affiliation with nontraditional groups. On October 10, 2006, the President signed a decree establishing a State Program on Patriotic Education of Citizens of Kazakhstan. Among other things, the decree warned against "the increasing activation of nontraditional religious associations and extremist organizations in Kazakhstan aimed first and foremost at attraction of young people." The decree cited the Hare Krishnas and Jehovah's Witnesses as examples of nontraditional groups and Hizb ut-Tahrir as an example of an extremist organization.

On September 15, 2006, the deputy chief commander of the KNB Counter-Terrorism Center stated in a press interview that the KNB was drafting legislative proposals to address so-called destructive sects and organizations. He named the Grace Church, Scientologists, and Jehovah's Witnesses as organizations that should be banned.

Also during the reporting period, the MOJ distributed a brochure designed to help citizens "avoid the influence" of religious sects. The Russian language section of the brochure warned against proselytizers and Bible studies and provided tips to avoid the influence of nontraditional religious groups. The Kazakh language section broadly criticized "foreign religious confessions" and declared that a Kazakh who becomes involved with a religious sect "betray[s] his/her faith and motherland." The Kazakh text specifically warned against Jehovah's Witnesses, Baptists, Ahmadis, and Hizb ut-Tahrir. The Jehovah's Witnesses objected to the brochure after learning that public school teachers in the Pavlodar region distributed it to their students in October 2006. The RIC reported that the brochure was produced by another section of the MOJ without the RIC's authorization, and was no longer in production. The brochure was reportedly distributed through public legal advice centers, but the RIC was unable to confirm how many brochures were printed or where they were distributed.

There were reports that local representatives of the KNB or police officials disrupted religious meetings in private homes during the period covered by this report. Several groups reported that local law enforcement representatives attended their services, although their presence generally was not considered disruptive.

Observers believe that security officials informally monitor some religious activity, particularly imams' sermons; however, it has not been reported that any monitoring had the character of interference or harassment.

Although in the previous reporting period the Ahmadi Muslim community reported difficulties in obtaining visas and registration for a foreign missionary and his family, the community reported no problems during the reporting period, and was successful in extending the visa of their missionary.

Several religious groups, including unregistered Baptists, the Grace Church, Hare Krishnas, and Jehovah's Witnesses, reported that they had been the subject of news accounts portraying nontraditional religious groups as a threat to security or society. Some of the news accounts appeared in government-controlled media.

==== Christianity ====
The Baptist Council of Churches has a policy of not seeking or accepting registration in former Soviet countries, and church members criticized the intrusive nature of the registration process for requiring information about ethnicity, family status, religious education, employment, and political affiliation. During the reporting period the Council of Churches noted several court cases against churchgoers throughout the country for participating in the activities of an unregistered group.

On October 23, 2006, the Oskemen city administrative court convicted a foreign citizen of violating the terms of his business visa for giving a lecture at a legally registered Protestant church. The foreign citizen was an administrator at a local university and had attended the church for many years. The court imposed a 41,200 tenge (US$322) fine and ordered his deportation. On November 14, 2006, the appeals court upheld the fine but eliminated the deportation penalty, contingent on the defendant leaving the country voluntarily.

According to media reports, migration officials in the city of Kyzylorda refused to extend the visa of South Korean pastor Kim U Sob after he was convicted in June 2006 of conducting missionary work without registration. Kim was charged after police raided the home of a church member he was visiting outside the city limits of Kyzylorda. Kim's registration was only valid for work within the city limits. Kim was forced to leave the country on November 14, 2006.

===== Jehovah's Witness =====
The national Jehovah's Witnesses Religious Center reported that it had generally positive relations with the government and the freedom to conduct their activities. However, the group experienced some registration difficulties and alleged several incidents of harassment by local governments. Although local Jehovah's Witnesses organizations are registered at the national level, in Astana and Almaty, and in 13 (of 14) oblasts, the center has attempted unsuccessfully since 2001 to register in Atyrau Oblast. The Atyrau regional procurator's office maintained that the group has consistently failed to comply with registration laws. The group submitted its most recent application on March 6, 2007. According to the Jehovah's Witnesses, the MOJ suspended the registration process on March 16, and forwarded the documents to Astana for expert examination, as in previous applications. On May 6, Atyrau police and procurators disrupted a gathering of Jehovah's Witnesses, videotaped participants and seized worship materials. The procurator filed an administrative case against six Jehovah's Witnesses for conducting religious activities without registration. On June 4, the local court imposed fines on the participants. The Jehovah's Witnesses appealed the decision, but on June 25 the oblast level court rejected the appeal without explanation.

In March 2007 Jehovah's Witness centers throughout the country rented local halls and rooms for an April 2, 2007, religious ceremony, and distributed fliers inviting citizens to the event. However, in several cities, including Kyzylorda, Shaktinsk, Shymkent, and Taraz, the landlords called the Jehovah's Witnesses shortly before the event and canceled the reservation. The Jehovah's Witnesses alleged that the landlords were pressured by local government officials. In Semey, the Jehovah's Witnesses and their guests arrived on April 2 to find their rented space surrounded by firefighters. A local government representative claimed that they needed a permit for the ceremony and denied them admission to their rented room. In each case, the Jehovah's Witnesses were able to hold their ceremony in other locations. No other religious groups reported similar instances of government interference in their public gatherings.

On January 18, 2017, Kazakhstan's National Security Committee arrested and imprisoned Teymur Akhmedov (61) who has a serious medical condition, and Asaf Guliyev (43) for speaking to others about their religious beliefs. In 2016, seven men invited Teymur and Asaf to a rented flat, saying they were interested in the beliefs of Jehovah's Witnesses. They also met at the homes of Teymur and Asaf later in the same year. During the discussion, the seven "Bible students" covertly video recorded the discussions.

Teymur and Asaf were charged with "inciting religious discord" and "advocating [religious] superiority." Both face a 5- to 10-year prison term if found guilty.

==== Hare Krishna ====
The Karasai regional government near Almaty continued a campaign to seize title to land used by the Hare Krishna movement. Following the Supreme Court's August 24, 2006, denial of the Hare Krishna's appeal, the RIC formed a special commission to resolve the issue and promised that no further action would be taken against the commune until the commission completed its work. Some participants described the commission as disorganized and subjective; Hare Krishna leaders alleged it was created merely to deflect criticism of the government on the eve of the Congress of World and Traditional Religions, which took place in the country in September 2006.

On November 21, 2006, with little notice to residents, Karasai district officials arrived at the commune with court orders, bulldozers, trucks, and riot police. Authorities blocked access to the commune, cut electricity, and demolished multiple homes, destroying possessions and leaving homeowners without shelter or compensation. The police beat several Hare Krishnas and arrested at least one resident who protested the action. The police attempted to bar observers from the process. The demolitions occurred without the knowledge of the RIC and before the special commission released its results.

On December 22, 2006, the commission released its decision, which did not effectively clarify the situation or move the parties toward a resolution. In public statements following the decision government officials stated that the Hare Krishnas were in violation of various land-use laws and were not victims of religious discrimination.

Karasai district officials continued their legal actions against the Hare Krishna properties throughout the winter and spring of 2007. Government officials in Astana, including the RIC and the human rights ombudsman, pledged to resolve the situation through dialogue, including a possible agreement to provide the Hare Krishnas with an alternate property. Nonetheless, on June 15, 2007, Karasai district officials again brought a demolition crew to the commune and destroyed an additional 12 homes, destroying many possessions and leaving the residents homeless. At the end of the reporting period, the situation remained tense and unresolved, and the Hare Krishnas continued to allege judicial violations by local officials and unresponsiveness on the part of the government.

Although many observers believed the Karasai district government's actions were motivated primarily by a financial interest in the land, the Hare Krishnas claimed the local government targeted them because they are a nontraditional religious community. Local officials criticized the Hare Krishnas as an illegitimate and threatening religious group. In an April 25, 2006, television interview, a local official from the Karasai akimat stated that the Hare Krishnas were dangerous for the country and "not accepted as a religion."

Only homes owned by Hare Krishnas were targeted for demolition, though the Hare Krishnas claimed that other homeowners faced similar legal circumstances. The government characterized the issue as a legal dispute, noting a series of court rulings that the land should revert to the Karasai regional government, because the farmer from whom Hare Krishna followers had purchased the land in 1999 did not hold title, and thus the land had not been properly privatized.

==== Orthodox Church ====
The other big minority of people in Kazakhstan belong to the Orthodox Group. As it is widely known, many Russians live in the South of Kazakhstan.

=== Forced religious conversions ===
As of 2007, there were no reports of forced religious conversion, including of minor U.S. citizens who had been abducted or illegally removed from the United States, or of the refusal to allow such citizens to be returned to the United States.

=== Improvements ===
In September 2006, President Nazarbayev hosted the second Congress of World and Traditional Religions in Astana, a gathering devoted to strengthening understanding between world cultures, religious groups, and ethnic groups and preventing conflicts based on cultural and religious differences. The event was highly publicized in the country, and included representatives of Islam, Christianity, Buddhism, Hinduism, Judaism, Taoism, Shinto, and other international religious organizations.

Nazarbayev regularly made public statements highlighting and praising the country's tradition of interethnic and interfaith tolerance, and remains engaged with international religious leaders and communities. On April 8, 2007, the president gave a nationally televised address during the Easter services of the Orthodox Church in Astana, declaring that "[i]nter-ethnic and inter-faith peace rules in Kazakhstan. We celebrate Islamic Kurban-ait, Christian Easter and the holidays of other religious groups equally, because we never forget the great truth common to all mankind: we have one God and everybody follows his or her own way to God."

According to government statistics, the number of religious groups rose steadily over the last few years. In April 2007 there were 3,855 groups, compared with 3,420 in 2006 and 3,259 in 2005. The Union of Baptists, for example, grew from 254 registered affiliated groups in 2003 to 319 in 2007.

The government made efforts to promote religious tolerance in its ranks. Human rights training provided to law enforcement officers by nongovernmental organizations in cooperation with the government included information on religious rights under the law.

There were no reports of incidents of anti-Semitism committed by the government. The leadership of the Jewish community consistently praised the government for its proactive protection of the Jewish community. As in previous reporting periods, leaders of the Jewish community reported no cases of anti-Semitism either by the government or in society.

== Societal abuses and discrimination ==
Kazakhstan is multiethnic, with a long tradition of tolerance and secularism. Since independence, the number of mosques and churches has increased greatly. However, the population, particularly in rural areas, is sometimes wary of nontraditional religious groups.

In mid-December 2006, the Megapolis weekly newspaper published interviews with a representative of the SAMK and a priest of the Russian Orthodox Church. Both clergymen favored tightening Kazakhstan's policy against nontraditional religious groups and called for legislative changes to prevent so-called "destructive" sects and to strengthen the privileged status of the two major religious groups—Islam and Orthodox Christianity. The Russian Orthodox priest stated that nontraditional religious groups such as the Jehovah's Witnesses, Mormons, Pentecostals, Hare Krishnas, and Scientologists have no historical role in Kazakhstan, and criticized their "destructive work" in the country.

Leaders of the four traditional religious groups, Islam, Russian Orthodoxy, Roman Catholicism, and Judaism, reported general acceptance and tolerance that was not always enjoyed by other minority religious groups.

In 2022, Lutheranism was also considered a traditional religion.

== See also ==
- Religion in Kazakhstan
- Human rights in Kazakhstan
- Bahá'í Faith in Kazakhstan
