= Baháʼí Faith in Kazakhstan =

The Baháʼí Faith in Kazakhstan began during the policy of oppression of religion in the former Soviet Union. Before that time, Kazakhstan, as part of the Russian Empire, had indirect contact with the Baháʼí Faith as far back as 1847. Following the arrival of pioneers the community grew to be the largest religious community after Islam and Christianity, although only a minor percent of the national whole. By 1994 the National Spiritual Assembly of Kazakhstan was elected and the community had begun to multiply its efforts across various interests. The Association of Religion Data Archives (relying on World Christian Encyclopedia) estimated some 6,400 Baháʼís in 2005.

== History in the region ==
=== A part of the Russian Empire ===
The earliest relationship between the Baháʼí Faith and Kazakhstan came under the sphere of the country's history with Russia. In 1847 the Russian ambassador to Tehran, Prince Dimitri Ivanovich Dolgorukov, requested that the Báb, the herald to the Baháʼí Faith who was imprisoned at Maku, be moved elsewhere. He also condemned the massacres of Iranian religionists and asked for the release of Baháʼu'lláh, the founder of the Baháʼí Faith. By the 1880s an organized community of Baháʼís was established in Ashgabat and later built the first Baháʼí House of Worship in 1913-1918.

=== Soviet period ===
By the time of the October Revolution Baháʼís had spread through Central Asia and Caucasus with the community in Ashgabat numbering about two thousand people. The community of Ashgabat had developed a library, hospital, hotel and Baháʼí schools — including a school for girls — all open to all people regardless of religion. After the October Revolution and the ban on religion, the Baháʼís (strictly adhering to their principle of obedience to legal government) abandoned their administration and allowed their properties to be nationalized. By 1938, after numerous arrests and a policy of oppression of religion, most Baháʼís were sent to prisons and camps or sent abroad. There were at this time some 1,400 families of Baháʼís resident in Ashgabat. The authorities arrested every adult male Baháʼí. The women and children were deported to Iran, while the men were either deported or sentenced to long terms of imprisonment or exile. Many were sent to Pavlodar in northern Kazakhstan. Baháʼí communities in 38 cities ceased to exist.

Baháʼís had managed to re-enter various countries of the Eastern Bloc throughout the 1950s, following a plan of the head of the religion at the time, Shoghi Effendi. By 1953 the first pioneers arrived in Kazakhstan. A pair of small communities are listed in 1963.

== Development of the community ==
There is evidence that the Baháʼí Faith started to grow across the Soviet Union in the 1980s. In 1991 a Baháʼí National Spiritual Assembly of the Soviet Union was elected but was quickly split among its former members. In 1992, a regional National Spiritual Assembly for the whole of Central Asia (Turkmenistan, Kazakhstan, Kirgizia, Tajikistan, and Uzbekistan) was formed with its seat in Ashkhabad. In 1994 the National Spiritual Assembly of Kazakhstan was elected.

As of 2001, 25 Baháʼí Local Spiritual Assemblies or smaller groups had registered with the government - and these communities totaled 25 of 55 of the organized communities of "nontraditional" religions ("traditional" being defined by the Kazakh government as Islam, Christianity, Judaism and Buddhism.) Local Spiritual Assemblies had been registered in many Kazakh cities. There were more registered communities of Baháʼís than Jews and Buddhists and the rest of the non-Moslem, non-Christian religious communities. In 1999 - the closest national census - 7% of the religious national population of 14,896,000 (or just over 1 million) were not Muslim or Christian.

=== Hostile atmosphere in 2000-2002 ===
- There are reports of oppression of religious minorities as early as 2000.
- A 2001 hostile newspaper article characterized the religion with various hostile statements as part of a generally hostile environment against several minority religions according to United States government reports. See Freedom of religion in Kazakhstan.
- The government of Kazakhstan voted against a United Nations General Assembly Resolution on the "Situation of Human Rights in the Islamic Republic of Iran" (UN document no. A/C.3/56/L.50) on 19 December 2001. Kazakhstan was among 49 votes against, 72 for, and 68 either didn't vote or abstained. See Persecution of Baháʼís.
- In 2002 a draft law more oppressive to religious minorities increased social pressure against them but by 2004 these draft laws and policies had ended and members of many religious minorities like the Baháʼí Faith considered the situation no longer repressive.

== Modern community ==
In 2002 Baháʼí Conference on Social and Economic Development for the Americas, held in Orlando, Florida had an attendee from Kazakhstan.

A Kazakhstan citizen worked at the Baháʼí World Centre in Haifa and volunteered participation with the Inspirit troupe which toured Vilnius in 2004.

A "Conference on Interfaith Cooperation for Peace," which was held on 22 June 2005 had Baháʼí speakers rising in support of the advancement of women and the conference was co-sponsored by several governments including Kazakhstan's, and at which the Kazakh Deputy Minister of Foreign Affairs also spoke.

In 2005 Kazakhstan government statistics reported to the United States indicated 44 registered "nontraditional" religious groups during the reporting period, (recall from above that 25 had been Baháʼí as late as 2001). The U.S. State Department says:

Kazakh laws were amended in 2005 to reinforce registration requirements and clarify that religious groups must register with both the central government and the local governments of individual regions (oblasts) in which they have congregations. Prior to these amendments, the government required religious organizations to register only if they wished to be accorded legal status in order to buy or rent property, hire employees, or engage in other legal transactions. Although the amended national religion laws explicitly require religious organizations to register with the government, it continues to provide that all persons are free to practice their religion "alone or together with others." To register, a religious organization must have at least ten members and submit an application to the Ministry of Justice.

A regional conference in 2008 on the progress of the religion in Almaty in southeastern Kazakhstan gathered about 650 people from Kazakhstan, Kyrgyzstan, Tajikistan, Turkmenistan, Uzbekistan, and Western Siberia.

The Association of Religion Data Archives (relying on World Christian Encyclopedia) estimated some 6,400 Baháʼís in 2005.

== See also ==
- Religion in Kazakhstan
- Freedom of religion in Kazakhstan
- History of Kazakhstan
- List of cities in Kazakhstan
- Baháʼí Faith in Ukraine
- Baháʼí Faith in Uzbekistan
