= Kazakhstan International Bureau for Human Rights and Rule of Law =

Kazakhstani human rights organisation

The Kazakhstan International Bureau for Human Rights and Rule of Law (KIBHR) (Note: Kazakh: Адам құқықтары мен заңдылықты сақтау жөніндегі Қазақстан халықаралық бюросы, romanized: Adam quqıqtarı men zañdılıqtı saqtaw jönindegi Qazaqstan xalıqaralıq byurosı, AQmZSJQXB; Russian: Казахстанское международное бюро по правам человека и соблюдению законности, romanized: Kazakhstanskoye mezhdunarodnoye byuro po pravam cheloveka i soblyudeniyu zakonnosti, KMBPCh) is a non-governmental organisation that advocates for human rights in Kazakhstan. It has been described as the "leading human rights organisation" in the country, and has faced opposition from the Kazakhstani government since its formation in 1993.

== History ==
=== Establishment and mission ===
KIBHR was founded in 1993 by a group of Kazakhstani human rights activists, with the support of the American non-governmental organisation, the Union of Councils for Soviet Jews. As of 2019, the KIBHR is based in Almaty, and has regional offices in Aktau, Aktobe, Astana, Karaganda, Kostanay, Oral, Oskemen, Pavlodar, and Shymkent. Its current director is Yevgeny Zhovtis.

KIBHR's mission statement includes the protection of the fundamental human rights of people living in Kazakhstan, including freedom from torture and ill-treatment. In addition to public advocacy work, it also promotes human rights through education, data collection, and analysis. KIBHR is divided into difference offices with their own tasks and goals, including the Human Rights Centre; the Information and Monitoring Centre; the Educational Centre; and the Volunteer Centre.

KIBHR also works alongside other Kazakhstani rights organisations, notably as part of the Coalition Against Torture, through which it monitors the use of torture in detention centres in 12 of Kazakhstan's 16 regions. Internationally, KIBHR has been a member of the International Federation of Human Rights since 2013.

KIBHR is often publicly critical of the Kazakhstani government. Its report on the 2019 presidential election found it to be irregular, and in July 2022, it joined 10 other international human rights organisations to call on the government to launch a fully independent investigation into the January Events.

=== State opposition ===
On 4 November 1999, a fire broke out at KIBHR offices, destroying much of its paper documents. Members stated at the time that they considered the fire to be a deliberate act of arson. A similar incident occurred on 15 August 2005, when KIBHR offices were again broken into and looted, resulting in the theft of 10 computers and the loss of almost all of the organisation's electronic records. The timing of the incident, shortly before the presidential election, led to concerns that the attack involved Kazakhstani authorities.

On 3 September 2009, KIBHR's director, Yevgeny Zhovtis, was sentenced to four years in prison by the Balkhash District Court in Almaty on charges of manslaughter after hitting a pedestrian with his car. Human rights organisations described his trial as "flawed" and accused the judge of ignoring evidence that suggested the incident had been an accident; Zhovtis was subsequently released from prison on 17 February 2014 after being granted amnesty.

On 25 January 2021, KIBHR was among three human rights organisations that were placed under a three-month suspension by the State Revenue Office of Almaty after being accused of failing to properly disclose having received foreign donations. Zhovtis criticised the suspension as being politically motivated, stating that KIBHR was exempt from the Entrepreneurial Code due to its status as a non-governmental organisation. KIBHR was ultimately fined ₸2.3 million. Front Line Defenders accused the Kazakhstani government of harassing the KIBHR and other human rights organisations through its tax mechanisms, and stated that KIBHR had been targeted solely due to its human rights activism.
