= Baháʼí Faith in Uzbekistan =

The Baháʼí Faith in Uzbekistan began in the lifetime of Baháʼu'lláh, the founder of the religion. Circa 1918 there were an estimated 1900 Baháʼís in Tashkent. By the period of the policy of oppression of religion in the former Soviet Union the communities shrank away - by 1963 in the entire USSR there were about 200 Baháʼís. Little is known until the 1980s when the Baháʼí Faith started to grow across the Soviet Union again. In 1991, a Baháʼí National Spiritual Assembly of the Soviet Union was elected, but by Riḍván 1992 it was replaced by several new national and regional assemblies following the political dissolution of the Soviet Union.

In 1992, a regional National Spiritual Assembly for the whole of Central Asia was formed with its seat in Ashgabat. In 1994 the National Spiritual Assembly of Uzbekistan was elected. In 2008 eight Baháʼí Local Spiritual Assemblies or smaller groups had registered with the government though more recently there were also raids and expulsions.

== History in the region ==
=== A part of the Russian Empire ===
The earliest relationship between the Baháʼí Faith and Uzbekistan comes under the sphere of the country's history with Russia. During that time, when the region was variously called Asiatic Russia or Russian Turkestan as part of the Russian Empire, the history stretches back to 1847 when the Russian ambassador to Tehran, Prince Dimitri Ivanovich Dolgorukov, requested that the Báb, the herald to the Baháʼí Faith who was imprisoned at Maku, be moved elsewhere; he also condemned the massacres of Iranian religionists, and asked for the release of Baháʼu'lláh, the founder of the Baháʼí Faith. Within the lifetime of Baháʼu'lláh the religion was established in Samarkand to which Mirzá Abu'l-Faḍl later traveled. While in Samarkand in 1892 Mirza Abu'l-Faḍl wrote a book, Fassl-ul-Khitab (Conclusive Proof), in response to the questions of Mirza Haydar-Ali of Tabriz. It was in Samarkand, too, that he debated a Protestant preacher. In 1910 the Samarkand Baháʼí community elected its first assembly in addition to having a school, and built a center which held four meetings a week.

One tablet of ʻAbdu'l-Bahá says to the assembly of Samarkand:

Do ye know in what cycle ye are created and in what age ye exist? This is the age of the Blessed Perfection and this is the time of the Greatest Name!… If we are not happy and joyous at this season, for what other season shall we wait and for what other time shall we look? This is the time for growing; the season for joyous gathering! …

=== Soviet period ===
In Tashkand, a community of Baháʼís had expanded to about 1900 members, supporting a library, Persian and Russian language schools, and large meetings were being advertised with the permission of government authorities. Baháʼí literature published in Tashkand included several works of ʻAbdu'l-Bahá. By 1938, after numerous arrests and a policy of oppression of religion, Baháʼís across the Soviet Union were being sent to prisons and camps or sent abroad. Baháʼí communities in 38 cities across Soviet territories ceased to exist. In Tashkent Baháʼís were interrogated and imprisoned. Aqa Habibullah Baqiroff of Tashkent was sentenced to ten years imprisonment "in the neighbourhood of the North Sea and the polar forests."

Following the ban on religion, the Baháʼís, strictly adhering to their principle of obedience to legal government, abandoned its administration and its properties were nationalized. By 1946 in all Turkestan only Ashgabat, Samarkand and Tashkand communities continued. Baháʼís had managed to re-enter various countries of the Eastern Bloc through the 1950s, following a plan of the head of the religion at the time, Shoghi Effendi. By 1956 there was only a vague mention of an operating community of Baháʼís in Uzbekistan.

A pair of small communities were listed in 1963 - Tashkand and an isolated Baháʼí in Fergana. The Universal House of Justice, the head of the religion since 1963, then recognized small Baháʼí communities in much of the USSR: Armenia, Azerbaijan, Georgia, Turkistan, Tajikistan, Uzbekistan. At this time in the USSR there were 200 Baháʼís.

== Development of the community ==
There is evidence that the Baháʼí Faith started to grow across the Soviet Union in the 1980s. In 1990 Local Spiritual Assemblies were listed in Samarkand and Tashkent. In 1991, a Baháʼí National Spiritual Assembly of the Soviet Union was elected, but by Riḍván 1992 it was replaced by several new national and regional assemblies following the political dissolution of the Soviet Union. In 1992, a regional National Spiritual Assembly for the whole of Central Asia (Turkmenistan, Kazakhstan, Kirgizia, Tajikistan, and Uzbekistan) was formed with its seat in Ashgabat. In 1994 the National Spiritual Assembly of Uzbekistan was elected.

== Modern community ==
In 2006 the US State Department ambassador-at-large for international religious freedom singled out Uzbekistan for criticism for its recent crackdown on religious minorities, saying the government of President Islam Karimov had stepped up restrictions. However Uzbek Baháʼís were able to attend a regional conference on the progress of the religion in Almaty in southeastern Kazakhstan in 2008. Two of the communities in Uzbekistan showed higher scale coordination on the efforts of the community. Three members of the National Spiritual Assembly were delegates in Haifa for international Baháʼí convention in 2008, and Uzbeks had joined the religion elsewhere. But in 2009-2010 registered groups had meetings that were broken up, and parents who had signed permission for their children to attend these meetings were fined. Propaganda about religious activities including those of Baháʼís and Muslims had been forced through Uzbek cable television operators.

=== Demographics ===
Statistics from the state Religious Affairs Committee indicate that one Baha'i community lost registration between October 2002 and February 2007. As of 2005 there were 6 communities registered with the government while in 2008 there were eight. These communities included Tashkent, Samarkand, Jizzakh, Bukhara and Navoi. The Association of Religion Data Archives (relying on World Christian Encyclopedia) estimated some 770 Baháʼís in 2005.

== See also ==
- Religion in Uzbekistan
- Freedom of religion in Uzbekistan
- History of Uzbekistan
- List of cities in Uzbekistan
- Baháʼí Faith in Kazakhstan
- Baháʼí Faith in Turkmenistan
- Persecution of Baháʼís
- Allegations of Baháʼí involvement with other powers
