= Marat Zhylanbayev =

Kazakhstani runner and activist (born 1963)

Marat Tölegenuly Jylanbaev (Note: Often transliterated as Marat Zhylanbayev through a Russified Romanization of Марат Жыланбаев.) (Kazakh: Марат Төлегенұлы Жыланбаев, [mɑˈrɑt tʰɵlʲeˈɡʲeno̙ɫɯ ʐɯɫɑnˈbɑjɯf]; born 19 August 1963) is a Kazakh human rights activist, politician, and former long-distance runner. As an athlete, Jylanbaev became known for running Ultramarathons across the largest deserts in Asia, Africa, Australia and the Americas. After starting his political career in local politics in the city of Ekibastuz from the late 1990s, Jylanbaev became more widely known as an activist following the 2022 Kazakh unrest, when he attempted to officially register his own political party "Alga, Kazakhstan!" (Kazakh: Алға, Қазақстан!, lit. 'Forward, Kazakhstan!'). In May 2023, he was arrested and charged with "financing extremist activities" and "participating in a banned extremist organisation"; he has since been described as a political prisoner by Radio Free Europe/Radio Liberty and the Human Rights Watch.

== Early life and education ==
Jylanbaev was born into an Argyn family on 19 August 1963 in Taldy, Karkaraly District, Karaganda Region, in what was then the Kazakh Soviet Socialist Republic. His parents, Tolegen Jylanbaev and Kaden Jylanbaeva, died when Jylanbaev was seven, and he was subsequently raised in children's homes and boarding schools in Karaganda Region. He studied physical education, but refused to become a teacher for the Komsomol and instead began work as a plaster. In 2005, Jylanbaev graduated with a degree in economy from Kazakh-Russian University in Aktobe.

== Athletics career ==
Jylanbaev began long-distance running in 1990, when he ran 85 kilometres in Barnaul in the then-Russian Soviet Federative Socialist Republic in 6:43:23, before subsequently achieving a Guinness World Record after running 23 marathons in 23 days. He went on to achieve similar feats, including running 15 marathons in 30 days; 75 marathons in six months; and 226 marathons in one year. Between 30 August and 5 September 1991, Jylanbaev ran to the summit of Mount Elbrus, the highest point in Russia and Europe. Between 2 and 22 April 1992, he raced across the Karakum Desert in Turkmenistan; the following year, he ran across the Sahara over 24 days, in addition to the Great Victoria Desert in Australia. In 1994, he raced across the Mojave Desert in the United States.

By 1995, Jylanbaev was running 85 kilometres a day, and following health complications ended up suffering from amnesia. As a result, he stopped running professionally and gave up long-distance running. In 2019, he was a special guest at a marathon in Aktobe, where he ran 10 kilometres and was awarded with an honorary medal in recognition of his achievements in long-distance running.

In 2019, Jylanbaev took part in a 250 km ultramarathon between the Singing Dunes and Charyn Canyon to raise awareness about the disappearance of native flora and fauna in Kazakhstan.

== Political career ==
In 1999, Jylanbaev entered into local politics when he was elected as a deputy in the Ekibastuz äkimdik, serving until 2007.

In 2021, Jylanbaev received renewed attention as an activist when he began writing online posts critical of the former President of Kazakhstan, Nursultan Nazarbayev. As a result of these posts, a non-governmental group, Ar-Bedel, issued a legal case against Jylanbaev for disrespecting Nazarbayev; the case was ultimately dropped on 19 January 2022.

Jylanbaev had further issues with the authorities in 2022. In June, he was fined ₸306,000 for violating public association laws after he distributed leaflets for his political party, Alga, Kazakhstan!. In November, he was arrested and sentenced to 15 days of administrative arrest after holding a public rally on the eve of a European Parliament delegation visit to Kazakhstan.

In February 2023, snap elections were called, and Jylanbaev subsequently stated his intention to run as a candidate for the Mäjilis, though he publicly cast doubt over the fairness of the vote. The manifesto for Alga, Kazakhstan! included calls for an international investigation into government actions during the 2023 civil unrest, as well as into Nazarbayev and his family. Jylanbaev was subsequently removed as an official candidate after it was alleged he had started campaigning too early, in breach of electoral laws. The evidence cited included a post Jylanbaev had made on social media asking for financial support to pay the registration fee to become a candidate.

As of July 2023, Jylanbaev had made 17 official applications for Alga, Kazakhstan! to become registered as an official political party by the Ministry of Justice; all of his applications were rejected due to the party not meeting the "requirements of the law".

=== 2023 arrest, imprisonment and conviction ===
On 17 March 2023, Jylanbaev led a protest outside the European Union's delegation to Kazakhstan's offices, calling on the Kazakh government to free political prisoners, agree to an international investigation into the 2023 unrest, and to register Alga, Kazakhstan! as an official political party.

Jylanbaev was arrested in May 2023, and a court in Astana subsequently sentenced him to 20 days of administrative arrest for taking part in an unsanctioned protest on 17 March. On 25 May, Jylanbaev's sentence was extended after he was charged with "financing extremist activities" and "participating in a banned extremist organisation". Jylanbaev was accused of being an associate of Mukhtar Ablyazov, a pro-democracy activist, with Alga, Kazakhstan! being described as being part of Ablyazov's own banned opposition political party, the Democratic Choice of Kazakhstan (QDT). Evidence cited included money transfers Jylanbaev had made to two candidates during the 2023 election. Alga, Kazakhstan! released a statement stating that Jylanbaev had donated money to the campaigns of two independent candidates who were not linked to the QDT. Following Jylanbaev's arrests, more than 20 Alga, Kazakhstan! activists were arrested and interviewed by police in Aktobe. In July, Jylanbaev's lawyer released a statement stating that Jylanbaev was experiencing ill health due to poor prison conditions.

Jylanbaev's trial began on 30 October 2023 in a court in Astana. After two unidentified witnesses claimed that they had experienced threats and intimidation, the state prosecutor announced that the trial was going to be closed to the public; this move was criticised by Jylanbaev himself, his lawyer and his supporters. Jylanbaev claimed the closed door policy breached the Kazakh constitution, and subsequently appeared at a court hearing on 1 November with his mouth sewed shut. He has since announced that will go on hunger strike in protest at the decision.

At a court hearing on 17 November, the prosecutor stated their intention to seek Jylanbaev be sentenced to a 10-year prison term.

On 30 November, Marat Jylanbaev was sentenced to seven years in prison. Amnesty International considers him a prisoner of conscience and asks for his immediate and unconditional release.

== Reaction ==
Following his imprisonment, Radio Free Europe/Radio Liberty and Human Rights Watch released statements describing Jylanbaev as a "political prisoner" and called for his immediate release from prison.

On 9 November 2023, Alga, Kazakhstan! filed a petition with the prosecutor general's office demanding that investigators into Zhylanbayev's case be held accountable for alleging falsifying the evidence against him.

== See also ==
- Duman Mukhammedkarim: Kazakhstani journalist similarly dubiously charged with extremism
