= Yevgeny Zhovtis =

Kazakhstan human rights activist

Evgeniy Aleksandrovich Zhovtis (Russian: Евгений Александрович Жовтис; born 17 August 1955) is a Kazakhstan human rights activist and director of the Kazakhstan International Bureau for Human Rights and Rule of Law.

After graduating as a mining engineer, he became vice president of the Independent Trade Union of Kazakhstan and represented the interests of miners, who worked under often inhumane conditions. He also became a member of the executive board of the Civic Organisation Memorial, working for public awareness of human rights and democratic values under the repressive conditions in the USSR.

After the dissolution of the Soviet Union and independence for Kazakhstan in 1991, Zhovtis continued working for human rights and qualified as a lawyer to help that work. In 1992, with the support of the Union of Councils for Jews in the Former Soviet Union, he founded the Kazakhstan American Bureau on Human Rights and Rule of Law. This later became an independent organisation under its present name.

== Personal life ==
Zhovtis is married, with a daughter and a son.

=== Conviction ===
While driving near Almaty in late July 2009, the car Zhovtis was driving accidentally hit and killed a pedestrian. On 3 September 2009 Zhovtis was found guilty and sentenced to four years' imprisonment on charges of manslaughter. Local and international human rights activists say the trial was flawed and used by the authorities as a convenient way to imprison him. After two and a half years in prison, Zhovtis was granted amnesty on 17 February 2012.
