= US Census Bureau International Data Base =

US Census Bureau International Data Base (IDB) is a global demographic product created by the United States Census Bureau. The U.S. Census Bureau has been preparing estimates and projections of the populations of foreign countries since the 1960s for a number of reasons. In the 1980s, the Census Bureau released its first comprehensive set of estimates and projections for over 200 countries and areas of the world. Since then, the Census Bureau periodically updates estimates and projections for countries as new data become available, funding permits, and conditions warrant. IDB estimates and projections are produced for those countries and areas recognized by the U.S. Department of State which have populations of 5,000 or more. The statistics are maintained for every year from 1950 until the present plus have future projections until 2050. Population size (by single year of age and sex) and components of change (fertility, mortality, and migration) are provided for each calendar year beyond the initial or base year, through 2050.

The U.S. Census Bureau International Programs office has released a web map viewer that allows everyone to explore this data set, the International Map Viewer.
