= Union of Evangelical Christian Baptists of Kazakhstan =

- Қазақстанның Евангелиялық христиан баптист шіркеулерінің / قازاقستاننىڭ ەۆانگەليالىق حريستيان باپتيست شىركەۋلەرىنىڭ
- Classification: Evangelical Christianity
- Theology: General Baptist
- Chairman: Frans G. Tissen
- Associations: Euro-Asian Federation of Evangelical Christians-Baptists Unions
- Headquarters: Astana, Kazakhstan
- Origin: 1992; Almaty, Kazakhstan
- Congregations: 256
- Members: 9,187
- Seminaries: Almaty Bible Institute
- Official website: baptist.kz

The Union of Evangelical Christian Baptists of Kazakhstan (Kazakh: Қазақстанның Евангелиялық христиан баптист шіркеулерінің, romanized: Qazaqstannyñ Evangeliialyq hristian baptist şırkeulerınıñ; Russian: Союза церквей ЕХБ Казахстана, romanized: Soyuza tserkvey EKhB Kazakhstana) is a Baptist Christian denomination in Kazakhstan. The headquarters is in Astana.

== History ==
The Convention has its origins in the establishment of the first Baptist Church in Almaty by Ukrainians in 1917. It was officially founded in 1992. In 2006, it left the Baptist World Alliance because of its support for the pastoral ministry of women.

According to a census published by the association in 2023, it claimed 256 churches and 9,187 members.

== See also ==
- Christianity in Kazakhstan
