= Christianity in Kazakhstan =

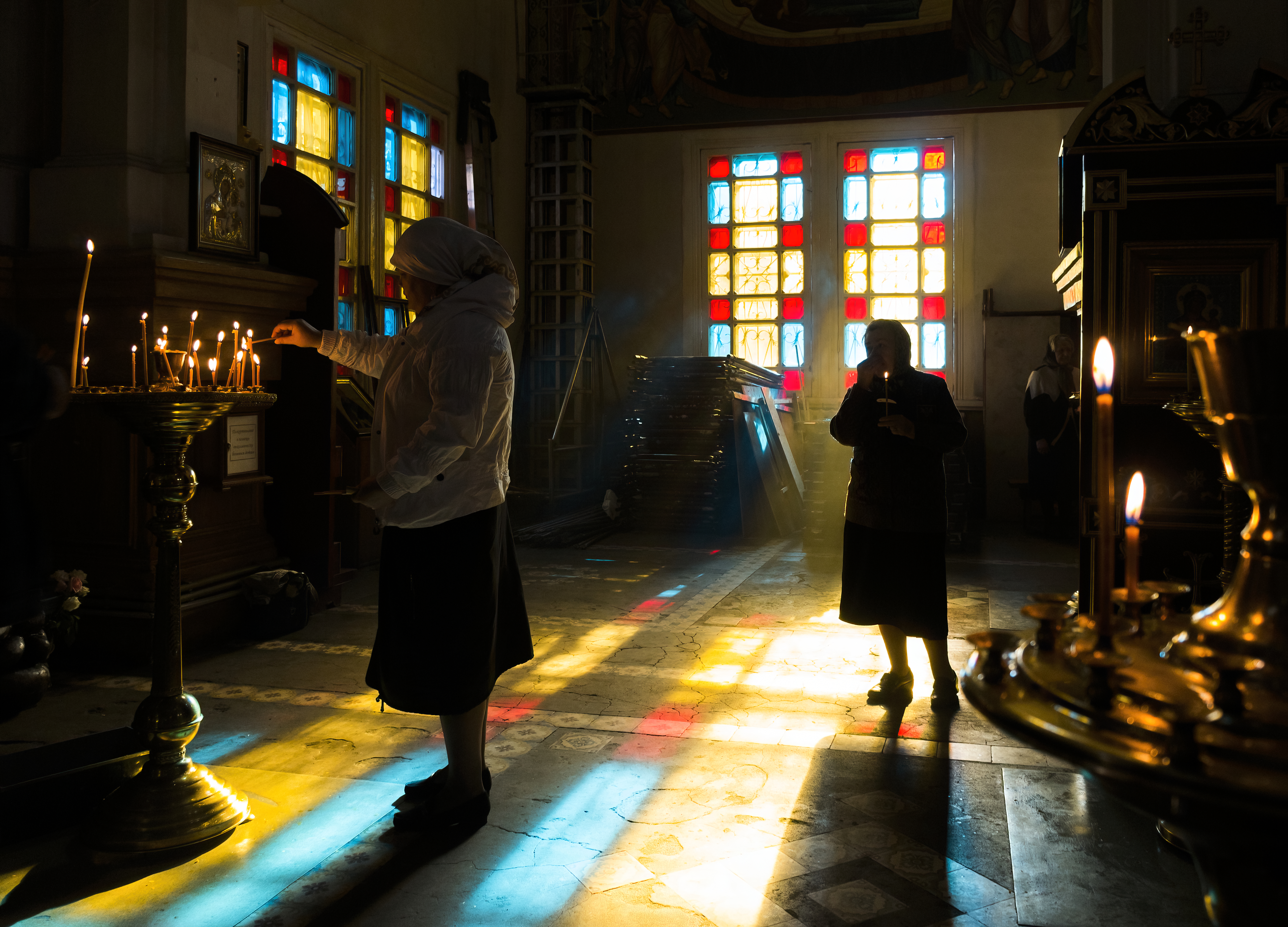
Orthodox prayers in Zenkov cathedral. Almaty.

Christianity in Kazakhstan is the second most practiced religion after Islam and one of the major religions of Kazakhstan.

== Demographics ==
The 2021 census noted that Kazakhstan is 69.31% Muslim, 17.19% Christian, 11.25% other religious beliefs and 2.25% no religious belief.

Other figures suggest that 24% of the population is Orthodox, 1% is either Protestant or Catholic and 1% belongs to other Christian denominations.

In 2022, the government considered several religions as 'traditional', including Hanafi school of Sunni Islam, the Russian Orthodox Church, Greek and Roman Catholicism, Lutheranism, and Judaism.

In 2009, the majority of Christian citizens were Russians, Ukrainians and Belarusians, who belong to the Eastern Orthodox Church in Kazakhstan under the Moscow Patriarchate. About 1.5 percent of the population is ethnically German, most of whom are Catholic or Lutheran. Other Christian groups included Presbyterians, Jehovah's Witnesses, Seventh-day Adventists, Baptist (Union of Evangelical Christian Baptists of Kazakhstan) and Pentecostals, Methodists, Mennonites, and Mormons.

== Ethnicity in 2009 ==
According to the 2009 Census, there were 4,214,232 Christians in Kazakhstan. Their ethnic affiliation is as follows:

- Russians - 3,476,748 (91.6% of the ethnic Russians)
- Ukrainians - 302,199 (90.7% of Ukrainians)
- Germans - 145,556 (81.6%)
- Belarusians - 59,936 (90.2%)
- Koreans - 49,543 (49.4%)
- Kazakhs - 39,172 (0.4%)
- Polish - 30,675 (90.1%)
- Tatars - 20,913 (10.2%)
- Azeris - 2,139 (2.5%)
- Uzbeks - 1,794 (0.4%)
- Uighurs - 1,142 (0.5%)
- Chechens - 940 (3.0%)
- Tajiks - 331 (0.9%)
- Turkish - 290 (0.3%)
- Kyrgyz - 206 (0.9%)
- Kurds - 203 (0.5%)
- Dungan - 191 (0.4%)
- Other minorities - 82,254 (52.3%)

== History ==
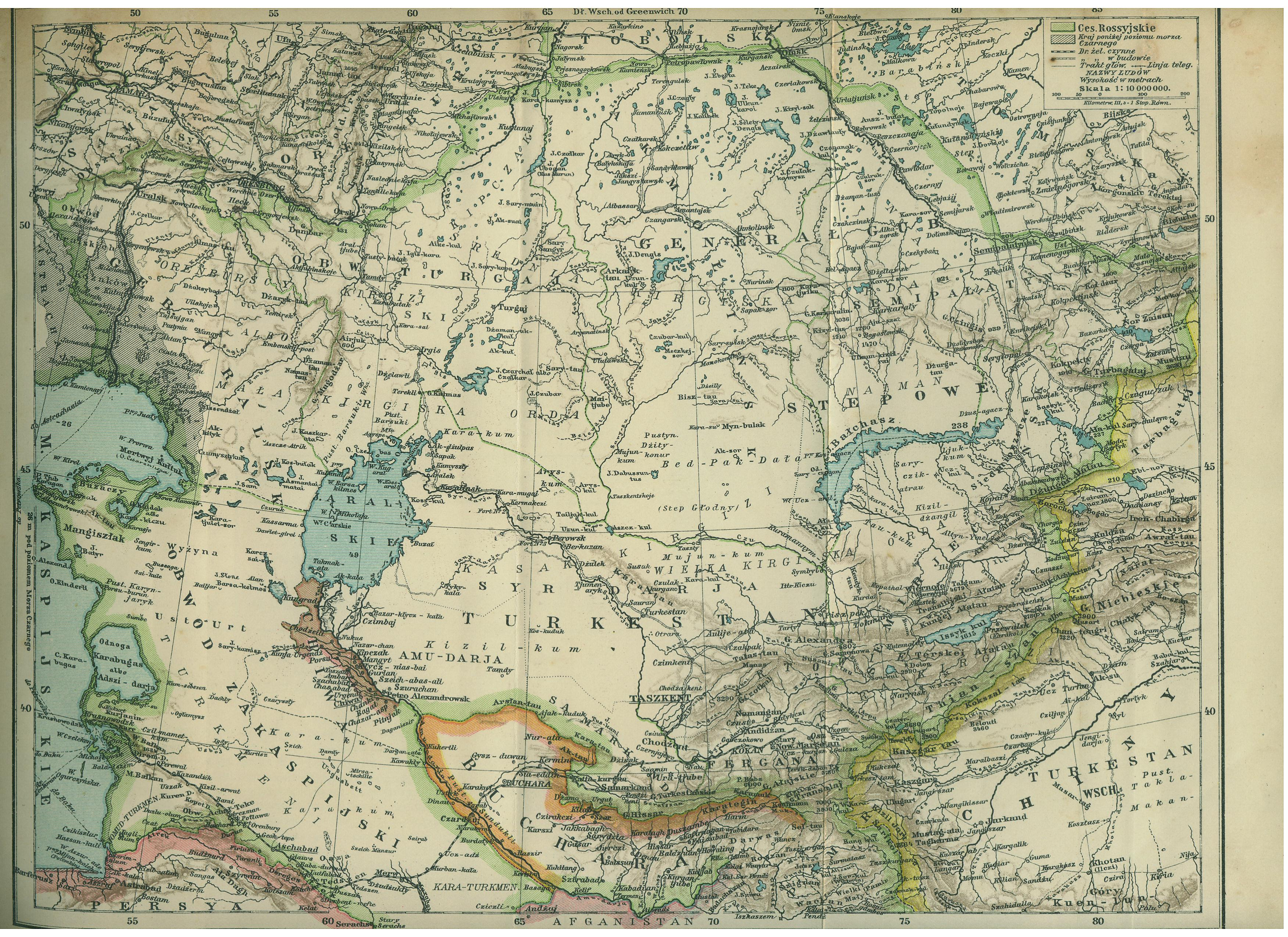
Map from a 1903 Polish encyclopedia showing the Naiman people living north of Lake Balkhash in eastern Kazakhstan

Before the conquest of Genghis Khan there used to be a minority of Nestorians in the Kazakh region. A bishop's see existed in the town of Merv in the year 334 and Nestorian visitors were in the country when Marco Polo arrived in the late 13th century.

By the time Kazakhstan was conquered by Genghis Khan, most of the Naimans were Christians. They remained so after the Mongol conquest and were among the second wave of Christians to enter China with Kublai Khan. Meanwhile, the Naimans who settled in the Western Khanates of the Mongol Empire were all eventually converted to Islam.

A Franciscan monk, William of Rubruck travelled around Kazakhstan in 1254. He met Möngke Khan and Sartaq Khan (great-grandson of Genghis Khan); both men converted to Christianity. A few years later Pope Nicholas III established the Diocese of Kipciak.

Russian Orthodoxy arrived in the country in the 18th and 19th centuries.

Incorporation into the Soviet Union led to decades of Communist Party controls including confiscation of church property, control of education, and the detention and execution of clergy. Political independence in 1991 led to more people taking an interest in religion, as they were now able to read and discuss matters of spirituality; this also led to a rise in the number of citizens identifying as Christians in the 1990s and the early 2000s.

== Converts to Christianity ==
A 2015 study estimates that some 50,000 Christians from a Muslim background reside in the country.

The Christian mission group Open Doors ranks Kazakhstan as the 47th worst country in the world to be a Christian.

== See also ==
- Religion in Kazakhstan
- Catholicism in Kazakhstan
- Eastern Orthodoxy in Kazakhstan
- Union of Evangelical Christian Baptists of Kazakhstan
