= Hinduism in Kazakhstan =

Hinduism in Kazakhstan is represented mainly by the ISKCON followers and by expatriate Hindus from India. The Census in Kazhakhstan doesn't recognize Hinduism. According to an estimate, there are about 500 Hare Krishna devotees in Kazakhstan. In 2010, there were 801 (0.005%) Hindus in Kazakhstan according to the ARDA. As of 2020, there were about 1878 (0.01%) Hindus in Kazakhstan.

Recently, the decision of the Kazakh government to raze a Hindu temple created a big controversy.

== ISKCON in Kazakhstan ==
Kazakhstan recognised Hare Krishna, a form of Hinduism, as an official religious movement in 2002 Worldwide Religious News.

Hare Krishna community now has only two of their 10 currently registered communities – in Astana and in the commercial capital Almaty - more than 50 members.

30 Hare Krishna families, predominantly Kazakhstan citizens, established a communal farm in Almaty Oblast consisting of 60 summer huts. Despite the fact that the community was registered on both national and local levels, members report sustained legal and municipal pressure from the local government.

=== Land Conflict ===
In April 2006, an appeals court upheld a lower court decision which invalidated the community's 1999 purchase of the land in Almaty Oblast. The reason given was that the farmer from whom the land had been purchased did not hold title. The court ordered that the property be returned to the local akimat. Following this ruling, on April 25, 2006, local officials attempted to evict the community from the farm. The officials were met with peaceful resistance and therefore did not escalate the matter forcefully.

Representatives of the community maintained that they were being targeted by the local government due to religious bias. They cited TV interviews by government officials in which they deemed the ISKCON community at the farm to be 'dangerous' for the country.

Independent religious observers, however, believed that the cases are motivated primarily by a financial interest in the land, the value of which has appreciated significantly since 1999. Human rights advocates and international observers brought the issue to the attention of national officials. At the end of the reporting period, the Government had not evicted the residents from the commune and the Hare Krishnas' appeal was pending before the Supreme Court.

Prior to the land confiscation lawsuits, the Hare Krishnas reported tense relations with Karasai akimat authorities, which they believe resulted in the community being subject to frequent inspections.

In 2004, the Hare Krishna commune was the subject of eleven inspections by different government agencies including the police, fire protection service, sanitary agency, environment protection agency, and land committee, and subsequently fined for various violations. According to the US State Department, the Hare Krishnas admitted several violations, which they attempted to rectify, but maintained that they had been subjected to closer scrutiny than their neighbors.

== See also ==
- Hinduism in Kyrgyzstan
- Hinduism in Turkmenistan
- Hinduism in Tajikistan
- Hinduism in Uzbekistan
