= Astana =

Capital of Kazakhstan

Astana Астана
- Capital city and City of republican significance
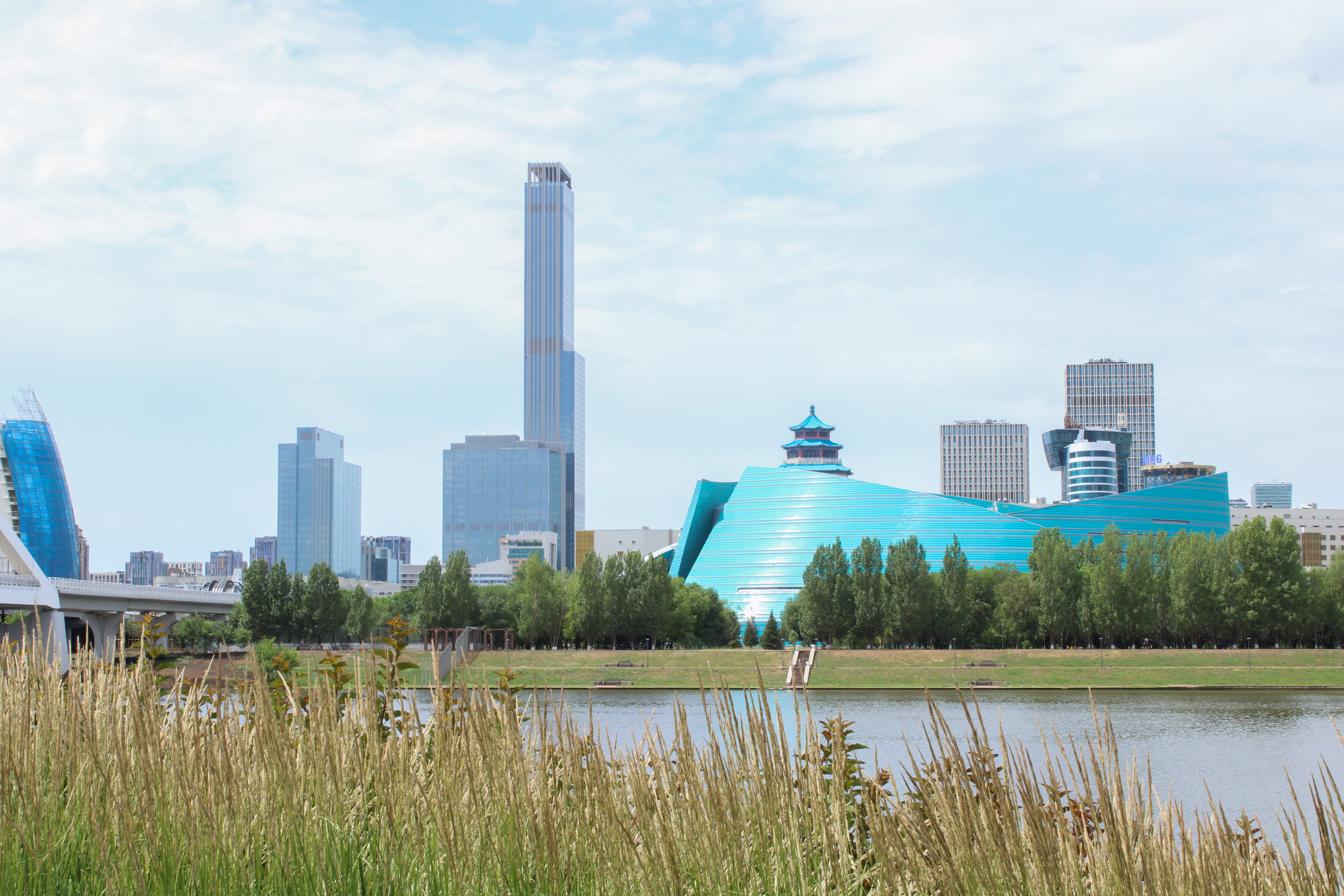
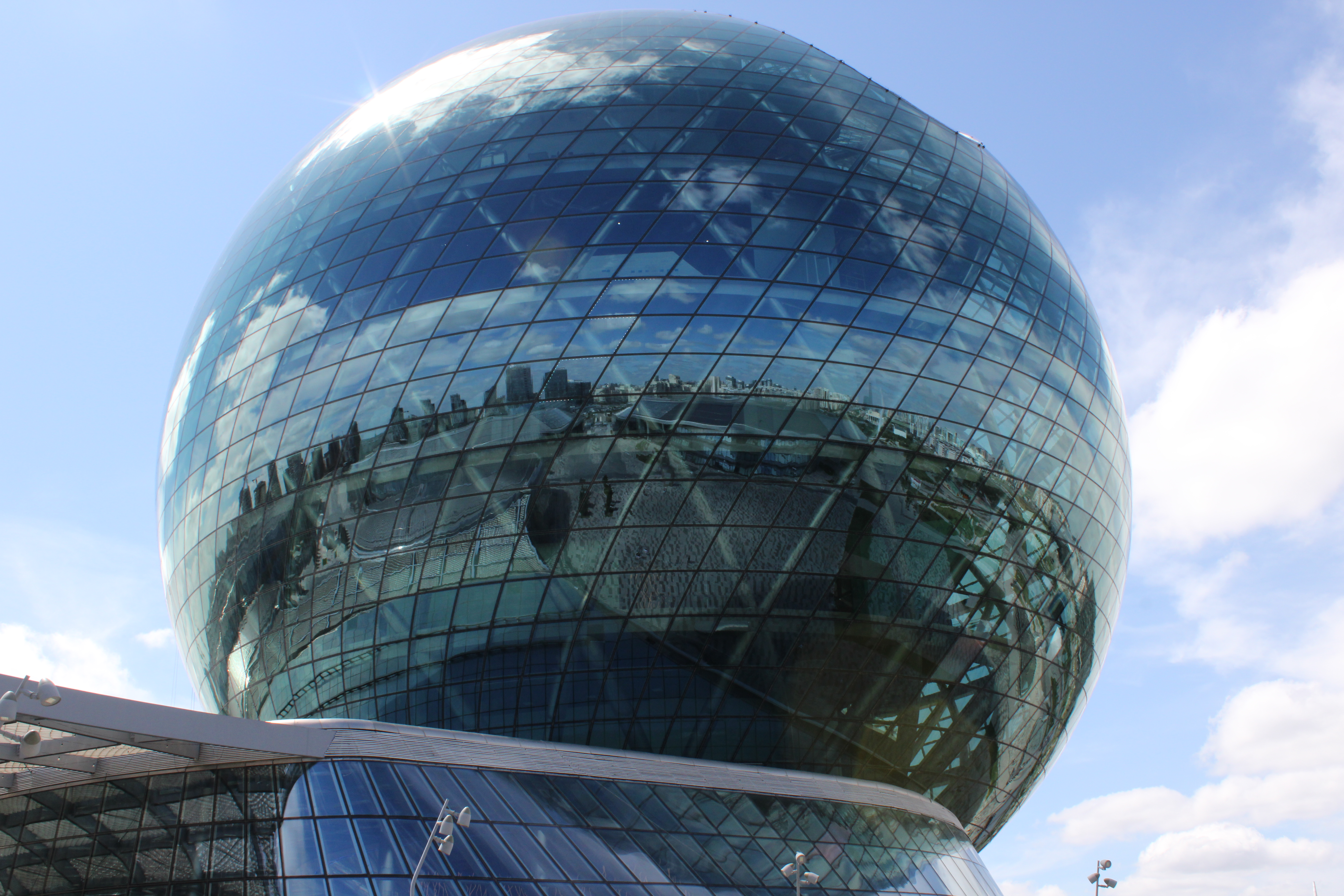
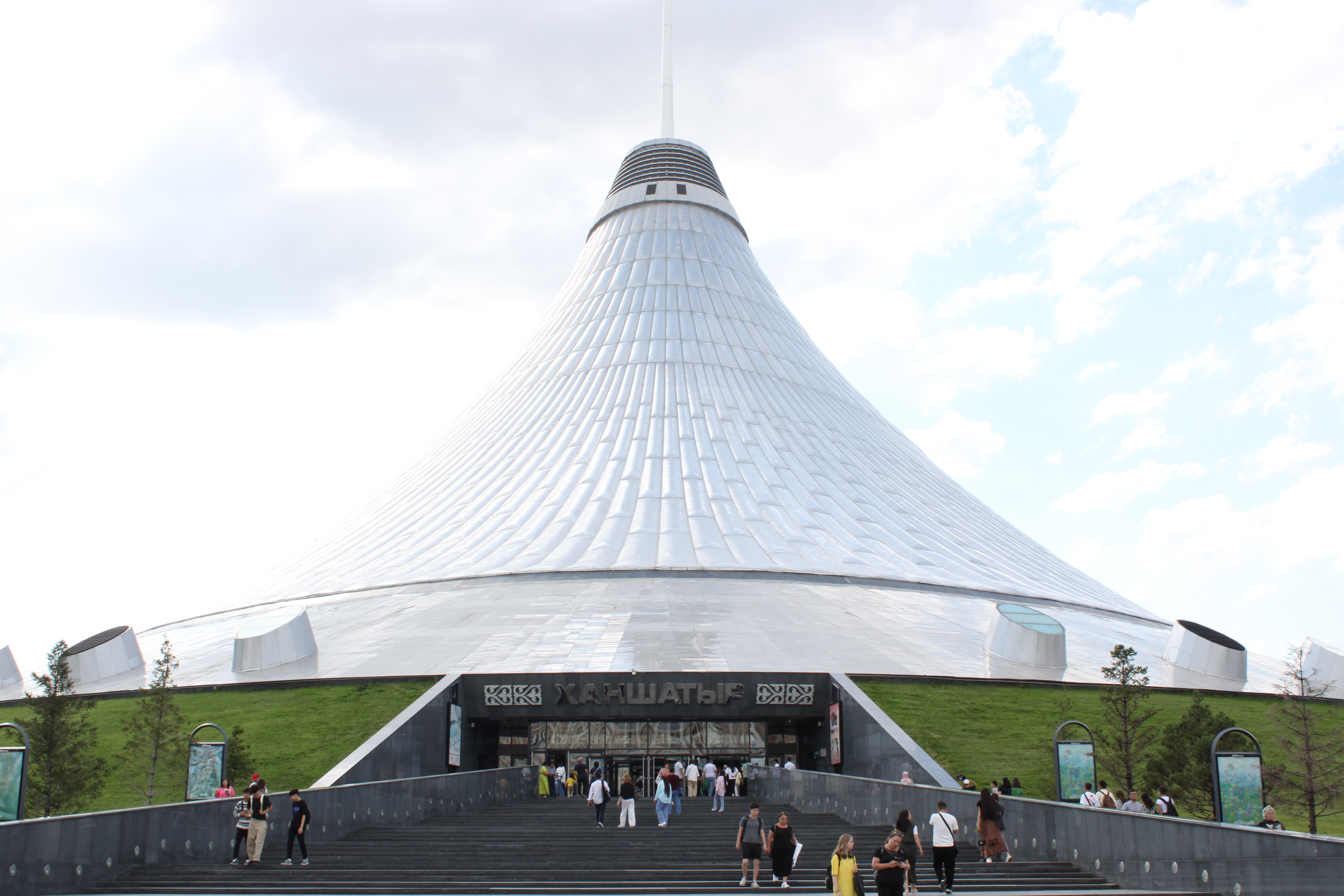
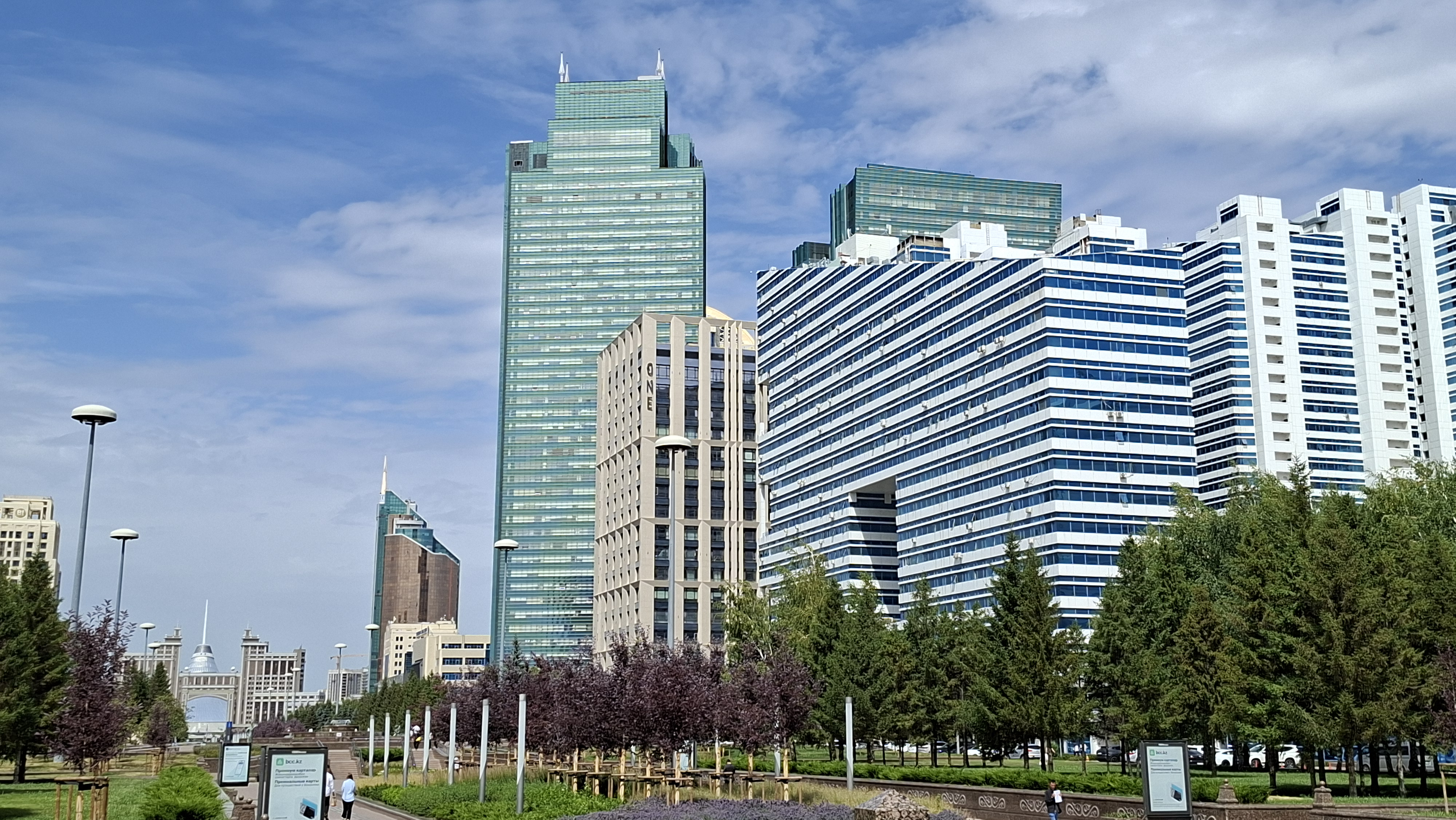
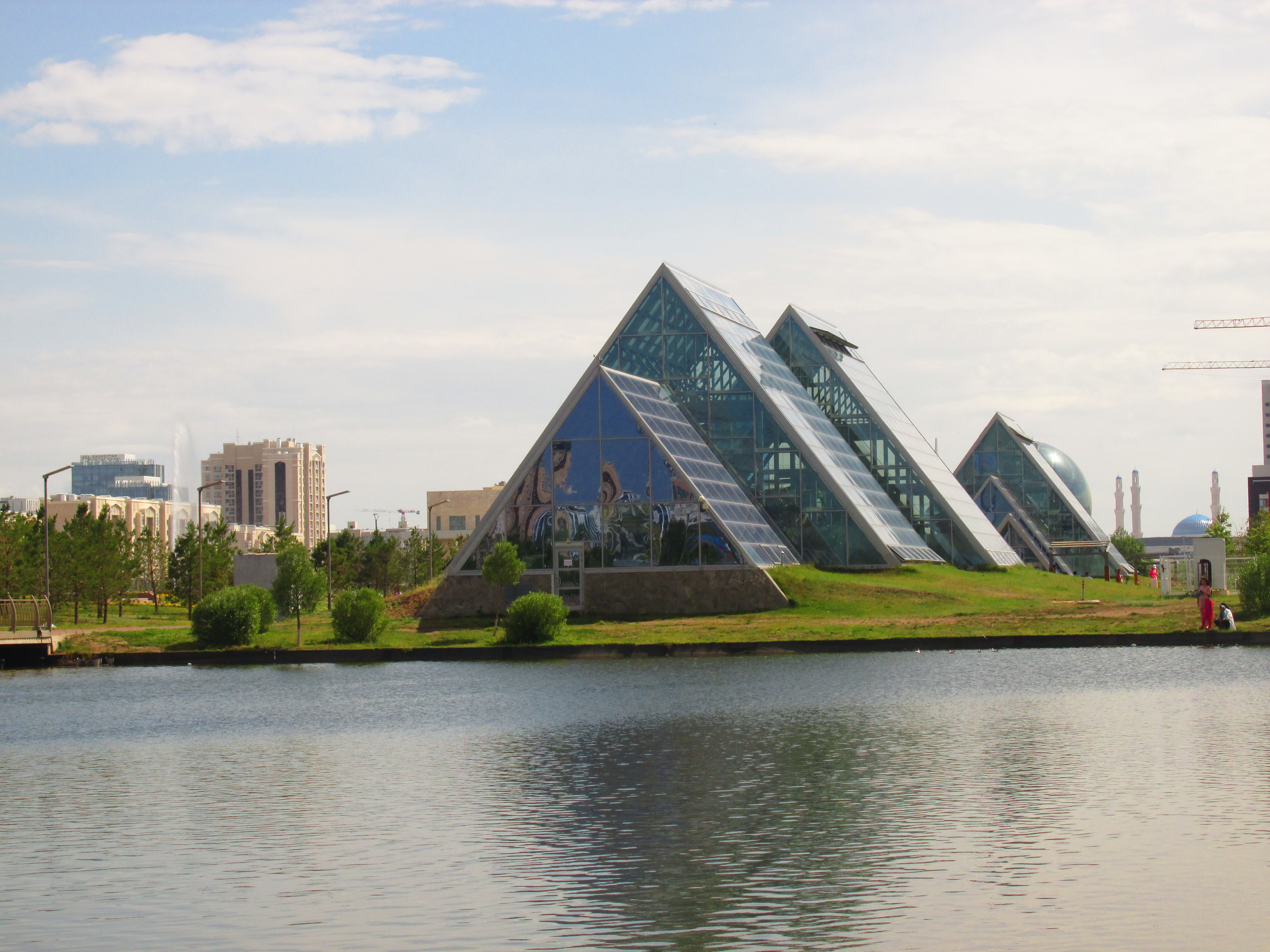
- Astana downtown with the Abu Dhabi Plaza (center) Baiterek AI Alem museum Khan Shatyr Nurjol Boulevard Astana Opera Astana Botanical Garden

- Flag Coat of arms

- Interactive map of Astana
- Location within Kazakhstan Location within Asia
- Coordinates: 51°8′N 71°26′E
- Country: Kazakhstan
- Founded: 8th century (as Bozok); 18 June 1830 (modern settlement)

Government
  - Type: Mayor–Council
  - Body: City Mäslihat
  - Äkim: Jenis Qasymbek

Area
  - City proper: 810.2 km^{2} (312.8 sq mi)
- Elevation: 347 m (1,138 ft)

Population (1 September 2026)
  - City proper: 1,700,385
  - Rank: 3rd in Central Asia; 2nd in Kazakhstan
  - Density: 1,760/km^{2} (4,550/sq mi)
  - Metro: 2,000,000
- Demonym(s): Astanan, Astanans (English); Астаналық, Astanalyq (Kazakh)

GDP (Nominal, 2024)
  - City proper: KZT 15,485 trillion (US$ 32.517 billion) · 2nd
  - Per capita: KZT 10,466,300 (US$ 21,980) · 4th
- Time zone: UTC+05:00 (Kazakhstan Time)
- Postal code: 010000–010015
- Area code: 7172
- License plate: 01, Z
- Website: www.gov.kz/memleket/entities/astana

Astana (Note: /əˈstɑːnə/ ə-STAH-nə, US also /æˈstɑːnə/ a-STAH-nə, UK also /æˈstænə/ a-STAN-ə; Kazakh: Астана, IPA: [ɑstɑnɑ]; Russian: Астана, IPA: [ɐstɐˈna].) is the capital city of Kazakhstan. With a population of 1.7 million within the city limits, it is the second-largest in the country after Almaty, the national capital until 1997. The city lies on the banks of the Ishim river in the north of Kazakhstan and is located within the Akmola Region but is self-administering. Initially founded as Aqmoly in 1830, the city was later renamed Akmolinsk, Tselinograd, and Aqmola before adopting the name Astana in 1998, or "capital" in Kazakh. In 2019, the city adopted the name Nur-Sultan in honor of former president Nursultan Nazarbayev, but it reverted to the name Astana in 2022.

Astana's history includes growth, rapidly expanding after becoming the capital. The decision to turn Astana into a modern and planned city was guided by Kisho Kurokawa. It has become an important center for culture, education, and commerce in Kazakhstan and Central Asia.

== Names ==
Akmoly was founded in 1830, named after a local landmark. "Ақ мола" (Aqmola) means "white grave" or "white tomb" in Kazakh, although this theory is not universally accepted. In 1832, it was granted town status and renamed Akmolinsk. In 1961, under Nikita Khrushchev, it was renamed Tselinograd, Russian for "City of Virgin Lands". In 1991, following Kazakhstan's independence, the name was changed to Akmola.

In December 1997, the city replaced Almaty as the capital of Kazakhstan, and in May 1998, it was renamed Astana, which means "capital city" in Kazakh. In March 2019, the capital was renamed to Nur-Sultan (/ˌnʊərsʊlˈtɑːn/; Kazakh: Нұр-Сұлтан / Nūr-Sūltan [ˌnʊrsʊɫˈtɑn]) in honor of the long-ruling President Nursultan Nazarbayev, shortly after his resignation. In September 2022, President Kassym-Jomart Tokayev signed a constitutional amendment to revert to the name Astana. As of 2022, it holds the Guinness World Record for the capital city with the most name changes in modern times.

== History ==
Many centuries ago, the Bozok settlement was located on the territory of modern Astana. It was a military fortress of the Steppe section of the Silk Road. The etymology of the Turkic word "Boz" carries several meanings, such as 'untouched earth', 'virgin soil', and 'feather grass'. It was a large settlement of the 12th-14th centuries. At present, Astana is expanding into the territory of ancient Bozok.

=== Early years (1830–1918) ===
The settlement of Akmoly was established on the Ishim river on 18 June 1830 as the seat of an okrug by Fyodor Shubin. In 1832, the settlement was granted town status and named Akmolinsk. The advantages of the town's strategic position were clear as early as 1863. It describes how picket roads and lines connected this geographic center to Kargaly in the East, Aktau Fort in the South, and through Atbasar to Kokshetau in the West. In 1838, at the height of the great national and liberation movement headed by Kenesary Khan, the Akmolinsk Fortress was burned. After the repression of the liberation movement, the fortress was rebuilt. On 16 July 1863, Akmolinsk was officially declared an uyezd town. During the rapid development of the Russian capitalist market, the huge Saryarka areas were actively exploited by the colonial administration. To draft a Regulation governing the Kazakh steppe, the Government of the Russian Empire formed the Steppe Commission in 1865.

In 1869, Akmolinsk's external district and department were canceled, and Akmolinsk became the center of the newly established Akmolinsk Oblast. In 1879, Major General Dubelt proposed to build a railway between Tyumen and Akmolinsk to the Ministry of Communications of Russia. In the course of the first 30 years of its existence, the population of Akmola numbered a trifle more than 2,000 people. Over the next 30 years, the city's population increased by three times according to the volosts and settlements of Akmolinsk Oblast. In 1893, Akmolinsk was an uyezd with a population of 6,428 residents, three churches, five schools and colleges, and three factories.

=== Soviet era (1918–1991) ===
The regional historical museum and state archive were founded in 1923 and 1924, respectively.

During World War II, Akmolinsk served as a route for the transport of engineering tools and equipment from evacuated plants in the Ukrainian SSR, Byelorussian SSR, and Russian SFSR located in the oblasts of the Kazakh SSR. Local industries were appointed to respond to war needs, assisting the country to provide the battle and home fronts with all materials needed. Additionally, many Russian-Germans were resettled here after being deported under Joseph Stalin's rule. During World War II, in connection with the formation of the Polish Anders' Army, a Polish diplomatic post was located in the city from February to July 1942. In the post-war years, Akmolinsk became a beacon of economic revival in the west of the Soviet Union ruined by the war.

In 1954, Northern Kazakh SSR oblasts became a territory of the Virgin Lands Campaign, in order to turn the region into a second grain producer for the Soviet Union.

On August 2, 1959, a tragedy occurred and 143 people died in the collapse of the Yesil Bridge. The only police officer, Nurmukhambet Kozhakhmetov, saved 40 people.

In December 1960, the Central Committee made a resolution to create the Tselinniy Krai, which comprised five regions of the Northern Kazakh SSR oblasts. Akmolinsk Oblast ceased to exist as a separate administrative entity. Its districts were directly subordinated to the new krai administration, and Akmolinsk became the krai capital, as well as the administrative seat of the new Virgin Lands economic region. On 14 March 1961, Khrushchev suggested the city should have a name corresponding to its role in the Virgin Lands Campaign. On 20 March 1961, the Supreme Soviet of the Kazakh SSR renamed Akmolinsk to Tselinograd. On 24 April 1961, the region was reconstituted as Tselinograd Oblast.

In the 1960s, Tselinograd was completely transformed. In 1963, work on the first three new high-rise housing districts began. In addition, the city received a number of new monumental public buildings, including the Virgin Lands Palace, a Palace of Youth, a House of Soviets, a new airport, and several sports venues. In 1971, the Tselinniy Krai was abolished and Tselinograd became the oblast's new capital.

=== Contemporary era (1991–present) ===
Following the dissolution of the Soviet Union and Kazakhstan's independence, the city's name was changed to Akmola. On 6 July 1994, the Supreme Council of Kazakhstan adopted a decree on relocating the country's capital.

On 10 December 1997, the capital of Kazakhstan was relocated from Almaty to Akmola. The city was renamed Astana in 1998. On 10 June 1998, Astana was officially presented as the country's capital at an international ceremony.

Factors cited in the decision to relocate the capital included the city's geographical location, available land for urban development, proximity to regional economic centers, demographic potential, and transport infrastructure. On 16 July 1999, Astana received the UNESCO City of Peace award.

In March 2019, the city was renamed Nur-Sultan in honor of Nursultan Nazarbayev, who had resigned as president of Kazakhstan after nearly three decades in power.

In September 2022, the city's name was changed back to Astana.

== Geography ==
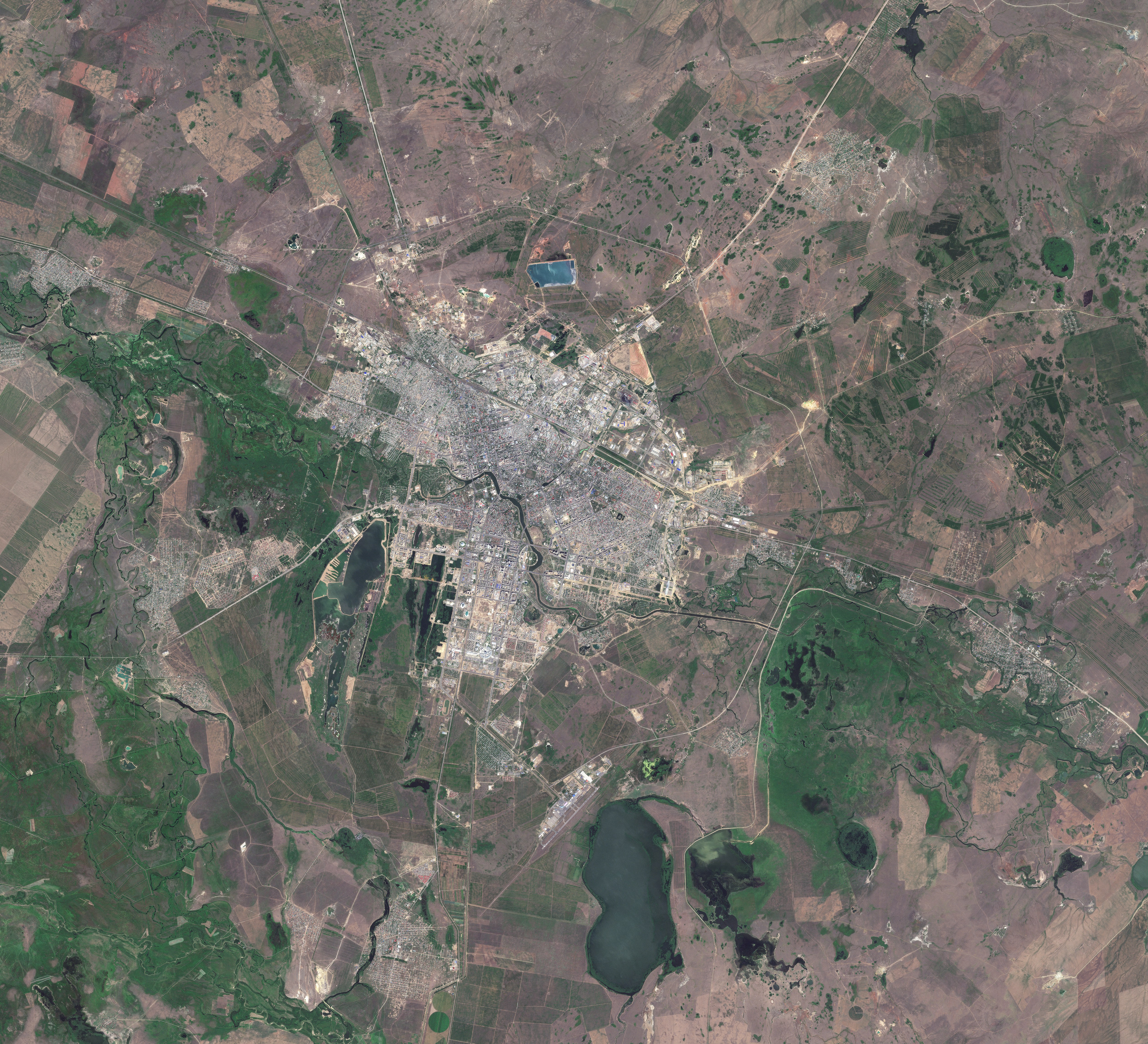
Satellite image of Astana and its vicinity

Astana is almost 1,000 km (620 mi) from the country's largest city and former capital, Almaty. The nearest big cities are Karaganda (200 km [120 mi]) and Omsk in Russia (450 km [280 mi]).

=== Topography ===
Astana is located in central Kazakhstan on the Ishim River in a very flat, semi-arid steppe region which covers most of the country's territory. It is at 51° 10' north latitude and 71° 26' east longitude. The city encompasses 722.0 square kilometres (278.8 sq mi). The elevation of Astana is 347 metres (1,138 ft) above sea level. Astana is in a spacious steppe landscape, in the transitional area between the north of Kazakhstan and the extremely thinly settled national centre, because of the Ishim River. The older boroughs lie north of the river, whilst the new boroughs are located south of the Ishim.

=== Time ===
Astana is 5 hours ahead of UTC, or UTC+5:00.

=== Climate ===
Astana is the second-coldest national capital in the world after Ulaanbaatar, Mongolia, a position formerly held by the capital of Canada, Ottawa, until Astana attained capital city status in 1997. Astana has an extreme continental climate with warm summers (featuring occasional brief rain showers) and long, very cold, dry winters. Summer temperatures sometimes reach 35 °C (95 °F), while −30 to −35 °C (−22 to −31 °F) is common from mid-December to early March. Usually, the city's river remains frozen from the second week of November until early April. Astana has a well-earned reputation among Kazakhs for its frequent strong winds, which are especially noticeable in the rapidly growing but relatively open Left Bank part of the city.

Overall, Astana has a humid continental climate classification in the Köppen scheme (Dfb). The average annual temperature in Astana is 3.9 °C (39.0 °F). January is the coldest month with an average temperature of −14.5 °C (5.9 °F) and record lowest is in January. 1893's cold wave reached temperatures down to −51.6 °C (−60.9 °F). July is the hottest month with an average temperature of 20.6 °C (69.1 °F).

Climate data for Astana (1991–2020, extremes 1881–present)
Month	Jan	Feb	Mar	Apr	May	Jun	Jul	Aug	Sep	Oct	Nov	Dec	Year
Record high °C (°F)	5.0 (41.0)	8.2 (46.8)	22.1 (71.8)	29.7 (85.5)	36.1 (97.0)	40.1 (104.2)	41.6 (106.9)	38.7 (101.7)	36.2 (97.2)	26.7 (80.1)	18.5 (65.3)	5.2 (41.4)	41.6 (106.9)
Mean daily maximum °C (°F)	−10.3 (13.5)	−8.8 (16.2)	−1.5 (29.3)	12.2 (54.0)	20.9 (69.6)	25.8 (78.4)	26.6 (79.9)	25.5 (77.9)	18.9 (66.0)	10.4 (50.7)	−1.3 (29.7)	−8.0 (17.6)	9.2 (48.6)
Daily mean °C (°F)	−14.5 (5.9)	−13.6 (7.5)	−6.0 (21.2)	6.5 (43.7)	14.5 (58.1)	19.6 (67.3)	20.6 (69.1)	19.1 (66.4)	12.6 (54.7)	5.0 (41.0)	−5.2 (22.6)	−12.0 (10.4)	3.9 (39.0)
Mean daily minimum °C (°F)	−18.7 (−1.7)	−18.0 (−0.4)	−10.4 (13.3)	1.2 (34.2)	8.2 (46.8)	13.4 (56.1)	14.9 (58.8)	13.0 (55.4)	6.8 (44.2)	0.5 (32.9)	−8.7 (16.3)	−16.0 (3.2)	−1.2 (29.8)
Record low °C (°F)	−51.6 (−60.9)	−48.9 (−56.0)	−37.2 (−35.0)	−27.8 (−18.0)	−10.8 (12.6)	−1.5 (29.3)	2.3 (36.1)	−2.2 (28.0)	−8.2 (17.2)	−25.3 (−13.5)	−39.2 (−38.6)	−43.5 (−46.3)	−51.6 (−60.9)
Average precipitation mm (inches)	17.8 (0.70)	16.7 (0.66)	20.0 (0.79)	21.7 (0.85)	33.4 (1.31)	40.0 (1.57)	55.8 (2.20)	31.3 (1.23)	20.8 (0.82)	26.0 (1.02)	29.0 (1.14)	24.8 (0.98)	337.3 (13.28)
Average extreme snow depth cm (inches)	19 (7.5)	23 (9.1)	19 (7.5)	1 (0.4)	0 (0)	0 (0)	0 (0)	0 (0)	0 (0)	0 (0)	4 (1.6)	13 (5.1)	23 (9.1)
Average precipitation days (≥ 1 mm)	5.8	5.0	5.4	5.3	6.6	6.6	8.3	5.4	4.3	5.7	6.9	7.1	72.4
Average rainy days	2	2	5	9	15	13	15	13	12	10	7	3	106
Average snowy days	25	23	19	6	1	0.1	0	0	1	7	18	24	124
Average relative humidity (%)	78	77	79	64	54	53	59	57	59	68	80	79	67
Mean monthly sunshine hours	103	147	192	238	301	336	336	294	230	136	100	94	2,507
Mean daily sunshine hours	3.3	5.2	6.2	7.9	9.7	11.2	10.8	9.5	7.7	4.4	3.3	3.0	6.9
Source 1: Pogoda.ru.net
Source 2: NOAA (sun, 1961–1990), Deutscher Wetterdienst (daily sun 1961-1990)

== Demographics ==
Historical population
Year	Pop.	±%
1897	9,688	—
1926	12,781	+31.9%
1939	33,209	+159.8%
1959	102,276	+208.0%
1970	179,514	+75.5%
1979	233,638	+30.2%
1989	277,365	+18.7%
1999	312,965	+12.8%
2009	613,006	+95.9%
2021	1,234,042	+101.3%

As of January 2025, the population of Astana is 1,528,703; more than triple the 2002 population of 493,000.

As of 2026, ethnic Kazakhs made up 83% of the city population, representing a significant increase from only 17% at the time of the country's independence.

Ethnic groups (2026):

- Kazakh: 83%
- Russian: 8%
- Ukrainian: 1.4%
- Tatar: 1%
- Uzbek: 0.6%
- Others: 6%

In 1989, Tselinograd had a population of 281,000. The ethnic mix was about 17.7% Kazakh, 54.1% Russian, and 28.2% other ethnic groups.

By 2007, Astana's population had more than doubled since becoming the capital, to over 600,000, and it topped 1 million in 2017. Migrant workers—legal and illegal—have been attracted from across Kazakhstan and neighbouring states such as Uzbekistan and Kyrgyzstan, and Astana is a magnet for young professionals seeking to build a career. Most of the immigrants in Astana are Russian.

=== Religion ===
Religion in Astana (2021)
Religion	Percent
Islam	78.48%
Christianity	10.99%
Other religions	0.30%
Atheism	2.31%
Undeclared	7.92%

Astana Grand Mosque is the largest mosque in Central Asia

Islam and Christianity (primarily Russian Orthodoxy, Roman Catholicism, and Protestantism) are the predominant religions of the city. Other religions practiced in the country are Judaism, Buddhism, and Hinduism. Astana is home to the largest mosque in Kazakhstan and Central Asia, the Astana Grand Mosque.

The Palace of Peace and Reconciliation was specially constructed in 2006 to host the Congress of Leaders of World and Traditional Religions. It contains accommodations for different religions: Judaism, Islam, Christianity, Buddhism, Hinduism, Taoism, and other faiths. Central Asia's largest synagogue is found in Astana. The Catholic community is served by the Our Mother of Perpetual Help Cathedral.

Moreover, Astana also serves as the headquarters for the Eastern Orthodox Church.

=== Metropolitan area ===
The metropolitan area centered upon Astana includes the Arshaly, Shortandy, Tselinograd, and (partially) Akkol districts of Akmola Region. The area contains 1.2 million people.

== Economy ==
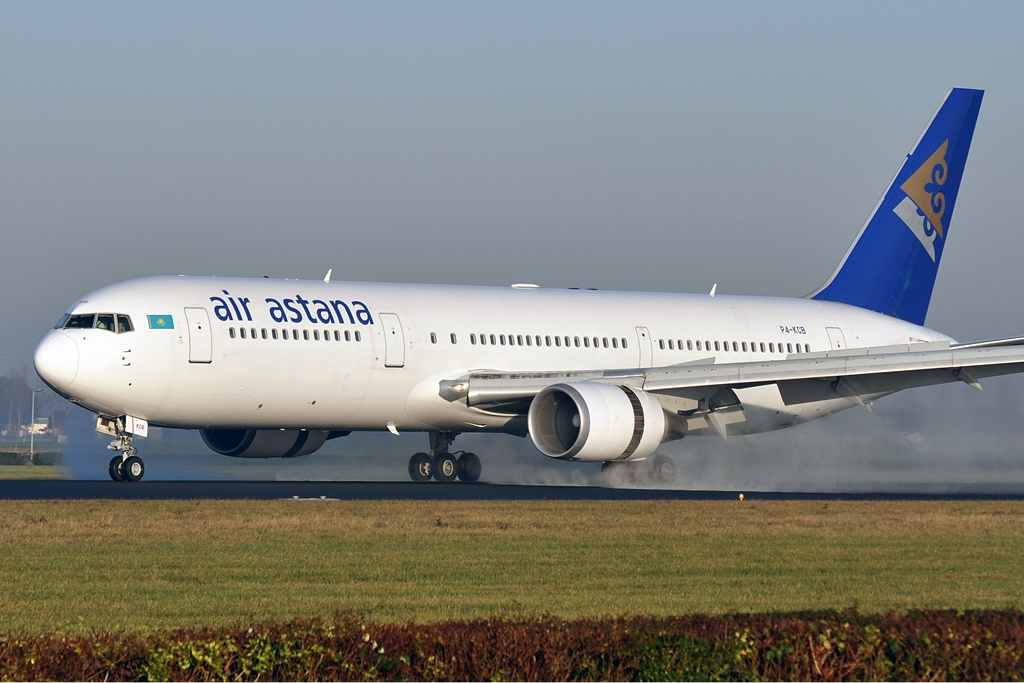
A Boeing 767-300 belonging to Air Astana, the largest airline in Kazakhstan

Astana's economy is based on trade, industrial production, transport, communication, and construction. The city's industrial production is mainly focused on producing building materials and foodstuff.

Astana is a major hub of the Belt and Road Initiative, including for financial services and legal services connected to BRI projects.

Astana is the leader in the CIS region on the Global Financial Centers Index rank in 2022.

The Astana International Financial Center (AIFC) opened in July 2018 to become a hub for financial services in Central Asia.

Astana is the headquarters of state-owned corporations such as Samruk-Kazyna, Kazakhstan Temir Zholy, KazMunayGas, KazTransOil, Kazatomprom, KEGOC, Kazpost, and Kazakhtelecom.

The shift of the capital has given it a boost to Astana's economic development. The high economic growth rate of the city has attracted numerous investors. In the 16 years since Astana became the capital, the volume of investments has increased by almost 30 times, the gross regional product has increased by 90 times, and industrial output has increased by 11 times. The city's Gross Regional Product makes up about 8.5 per cent of the republic's Gross domestic product.

KazMunayGas headquarters

The Astana – New City special economic zone was established in 2001 to help develop industry and increase the attractiveness of the city to investors. The SEZ plans to commission five projects worth 20 billion KZT (around $108 million) in the Industrial Park No. 1 in 2015. The projects include construction of a plant for the production of diesel engines, a fast food complex, temporary storage warehouses and a business center, a furniture factory, and the production of military and civil engineering machinery. The new Astana International Financial Centre opened in July 2018.

Astana's administration is promoting the development of small and medium-sized businesses through the cooperation of the Sovereign Welfare Fund Samruk-Kazyna and the National Economic Chamber. Support is provided by a special program of crediting. As a result, the number of small and medium-sized businesses increased by 13.7% to over 96,000 compared to the previous year as of 1 July 2015. In addition, the number of people employed in small and medium-sized businesses increased by 17.8% to over 234,000 people as of 1 April 2015.

Astana was included in the list of the top 21 intelligent communities of the world, according to the report released by the Intelligent Community Forum in October 2016. The rating list includes the cities, regions, and communities that utilize digital instruments for the construction of the local economy and society.

In 2018, Astana attracted more than three trillion tenge (US$7.91 billion) in foreign direct investment, a record amount for the city. The growth was achieved due to a large number of construction projects.

Tourism has become one of the factors that drives economic growth in the city. Astana is among the top ten most attractive tourist cities in the Commonwealth of Independent States (CIS).

== Diplomacy platform ==
Astana has become a platform for high-profile diplomatic talks and summits on critical global issues. Astana has hosted multiple rounds of talks between the Syrian Arab Republic government, led by Bashar al-Assad, and the Syrian opposition. The 12th Ministerial Conference of the World Trade Organization (WTO) was originally scheduled to take place in June 2020 in then-Nur-Sultan, Kazakhstan, but was postponed due to the COVID-19 pandemic. In May 2020, WTO members discussed Kazakhstan's offer to reschedule the conference to June 2021, but postponed taking a decision due to the ongoing pandemic. In April 2021, members agreed that MC12 would take place in Geneva from 30 November to 3 December. Since 2003, Astana has hosted the Congress on World and Traditional Religions, which is a diverse gathering of religious leaders to discuss religious harmony and ending terrorism and extremism.

== Cityscape ==
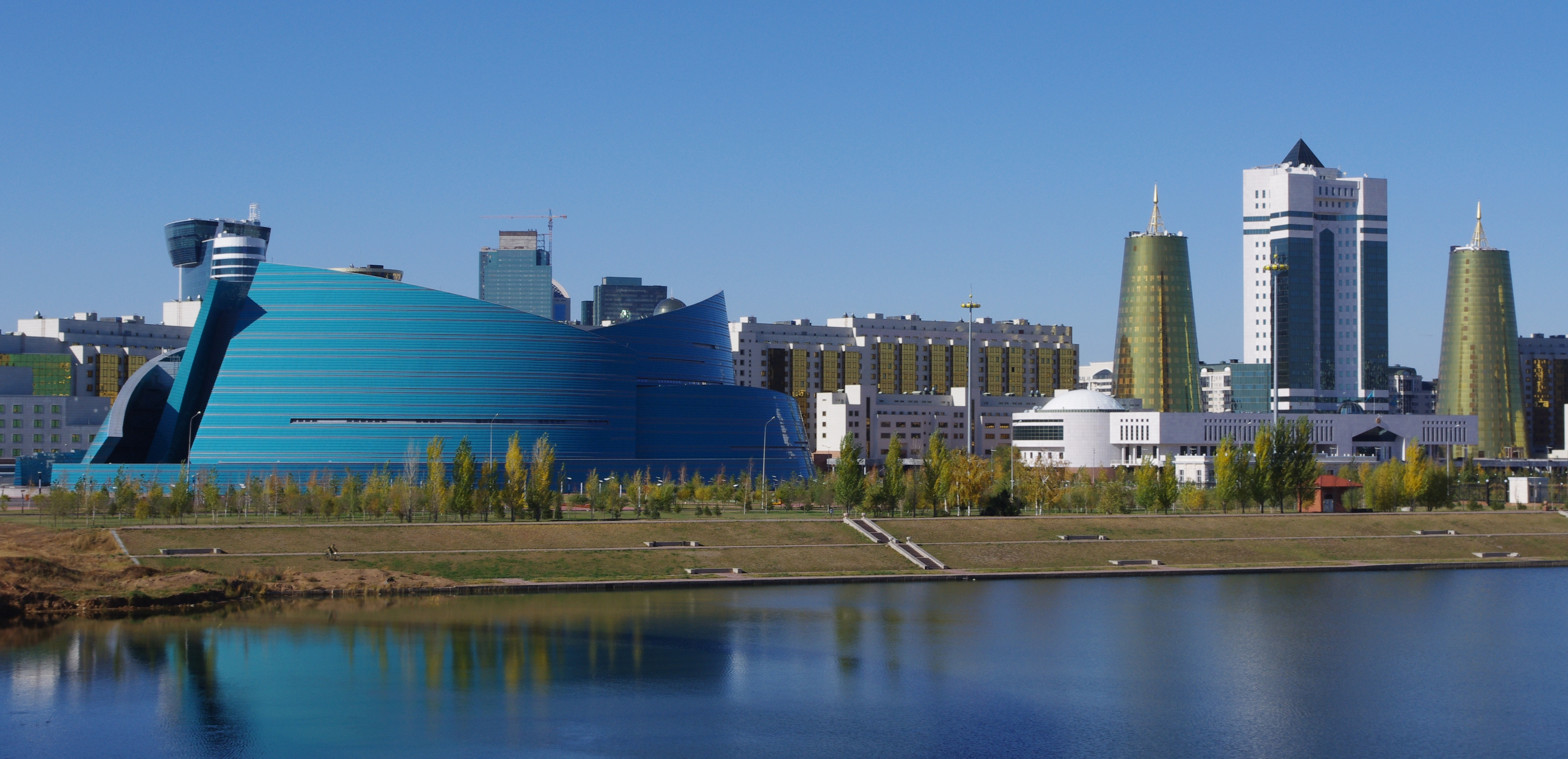
The National Concert hall

Astana is subdivided into six districts. Almaty District was created on 6 May 1998 by presidential decree. The district's territory encompasses an area of 21,054 hectares (52,030 acres; 81.29 square miles) with a population of 375,938 people. The district has five villages. Yesil District, which is also called left bank of the city, was created on 5 August 2008 by presidential decree. The district's territory encompasses an area of 31,179 ha (77,040 acres; 120.38 sq mi) with a population of 119,929 people. Saryarka District was created on 6 May 1998 by presidential decree. The district's territory encompasses an area of 19,202 ha (47,450 acres; 74.14 sq mi) with a population of 339,286 people. Baykonyr District was created on 16 March 2018 by presidential decree. The district's territory encompasses an area of 18,129 ha (44,800 acres; 70.00 sq mi) with a population of 233 351 people. Nura District was created on 28 December 2022 by presidential decree. It was originally the west part of the Yesil District before the divide. This district's territory encompasses an area of 19,336 ha (47,780 acres; 74.60 sq mi) with an population of 303 914 people. Sarayşiq District was created on 29 January 2025 by presidential decree. It was originally the south part of the Almaty District before the divide. This district's territory encompasses an area of 6,953 ha (17,181 acres; 26.85 sq mi) with an population of approximately 200 000 people.

In April 1998, the Government of Kazakhstan asked architects and urban planners of international renown to participate in a design competition for the new capital. On 6 October 1998, Japanese architect Kisho Kurokawa was awarded the First Prize. Kurokawa's proposal aimed to preserve and redevelop the existing city, and create a new city at the south and the east sides of the Ishim River, enabling the Symbiosis of the History and the Future.

North of the railway line, which crosses Astana in an east–west direction, are industrial and poorer residential areas. Between the railway line and the Ishim river is the city centre, where at present intense building activity is occurring. To the west and east are more elevated residential areas with parks and the new area of government administration to the south of the Ishim River. Here many large building projects are under way; for example, the construction of a diplomatic quarter, and government buildings. By 2030, these quarters are to be completed. Astana's chief planner, Vladimir Laptev, wants to build a Berlin in a Eurasian style. He has stated that a purely administrative capital such as Canberra is not one of his goals.

Two of the most significant structures in Astana's developing urban landscape are the Palace of Peace and Reconciliation and the Khan Shatyr Entertainment Center. Their architectural styles are intended to echo features of the nomadic empires that shaped the history of the Eurasian steppes.

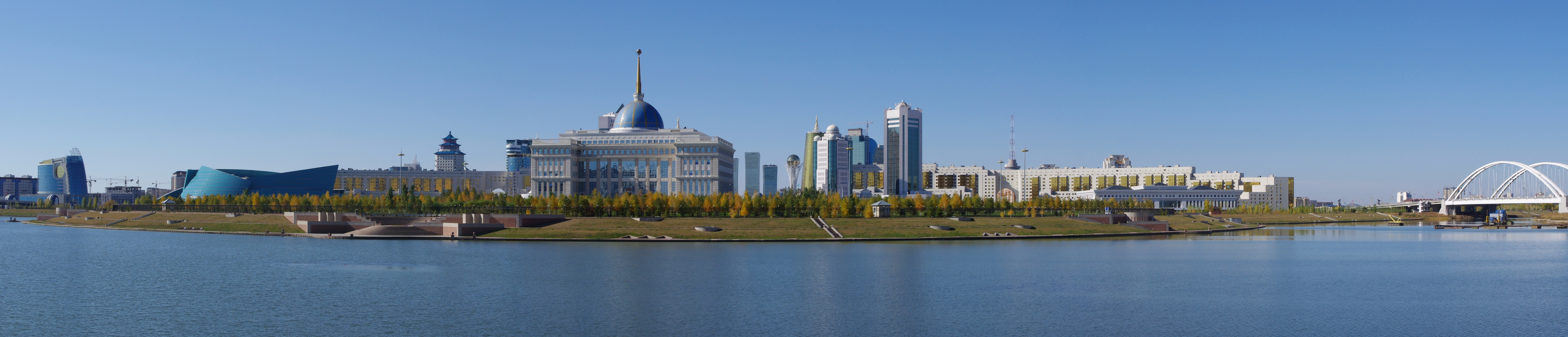
Panoramic view of the governmental headquarters

== Sport ==
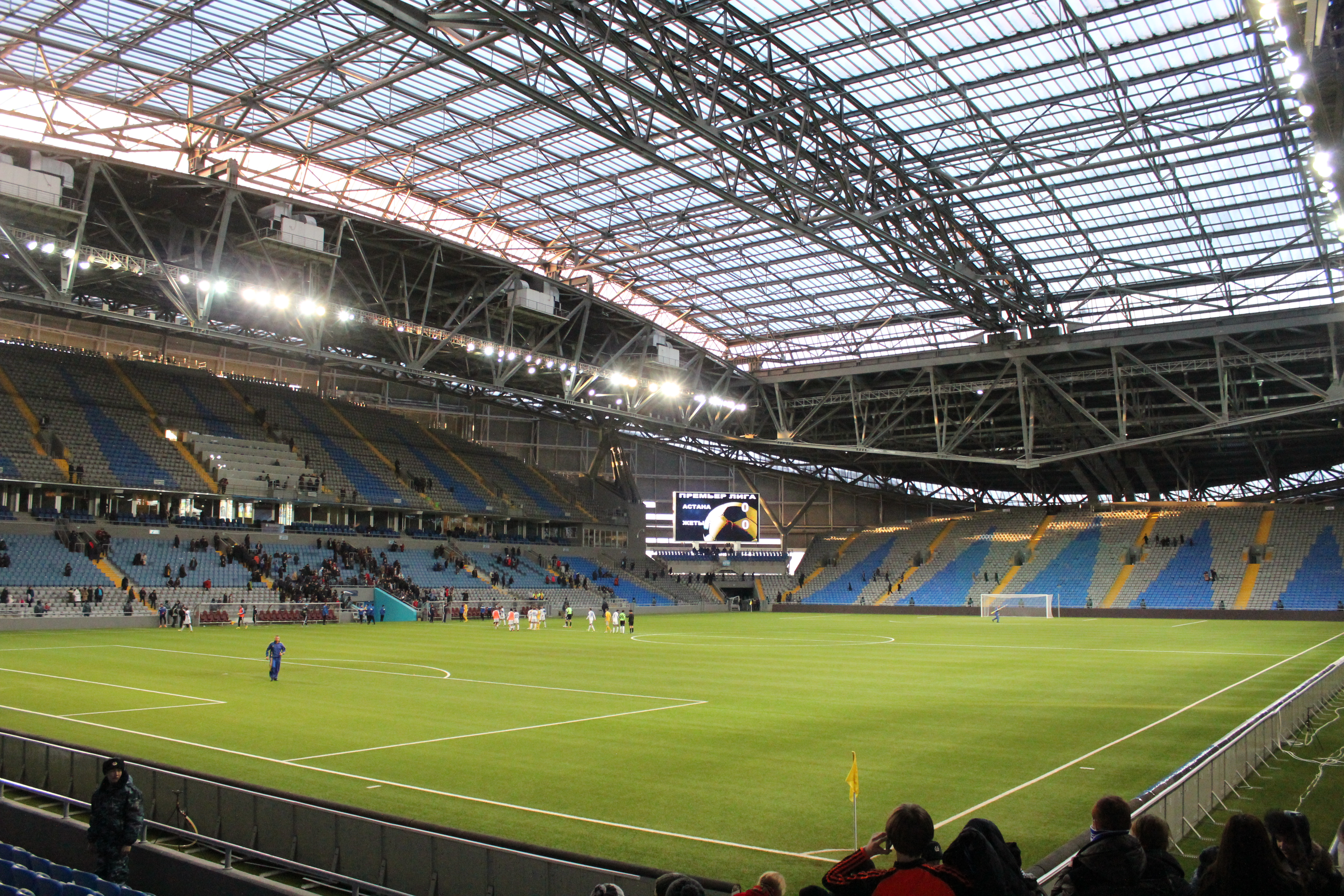
Astana Arena, opened in 2009

The city has a variety of sports teams. The major association football team is the FC Astana of the Kazakhstan Premier League. Founded in 2009, the FC Astana won six league titles, three Kazakh Cups and five Kazakh Super Cups. Their home stadium is the Astana Arena, which also serves as a home for the Kazakhstan national football team and the FC Bayterek. The FC Bayterek is a member of the Kazakhstan First Division. They were founded in 2012, to develop youth football. The FC Astana-1964 is based in the Kazhymukan Munaitpasov Stadium and plays in the Astana Municipal Football League. The club's most successful years were 2000s, when they won 3 league titles. Astana is home to several professional ice hockey teams. The Barys Astana, a founding member of the Kontinental Hockey League in 2008 and based in the Barys Arena. The Nomad Astana and HC Astana play in the Kazakhstan Hockey Championship. The Snezhnye Barsy of the Junior Hockey League is a junior team of the Barys Astana. Astana annually hosts the President of the Republic of Kazakhstan's Cup ice hockey tournament.

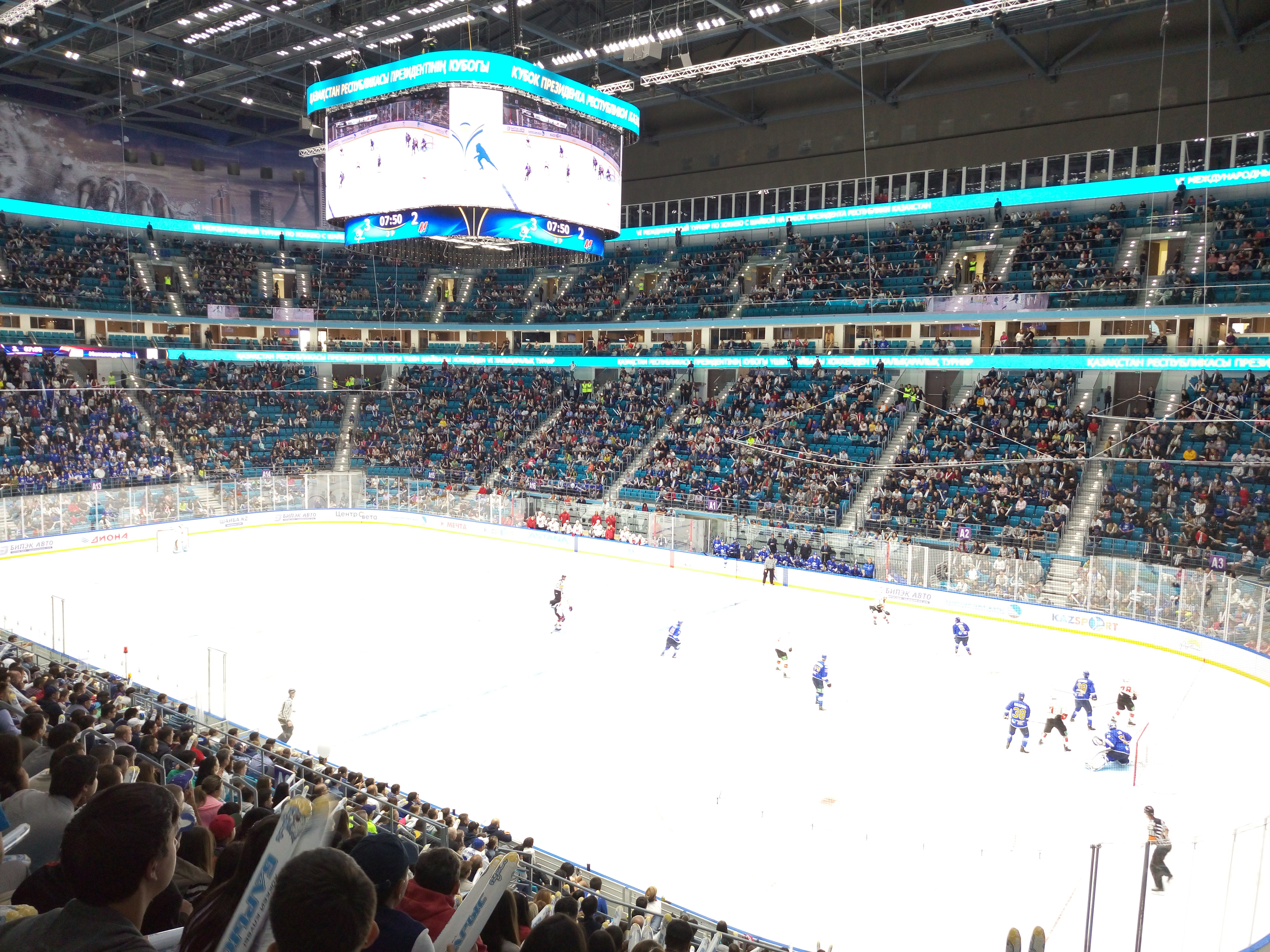
Barys Arena in 2015

The Astana Pro Team, founded in 2007, participates in the UCI World Tour. The team is one of the most successful road cycling teams of recent years, winning several grand tours. The BC Astana of the VTB United League and the Kazakhstan Basketball League is the only professional basketball team in Astana. It is the most successful basketball team in Kazakhstan with three Kazakhstan Basketball League titles and four Kazakhstan Basketball Cups. Its home arena is the Saryarka Velodrome, which is mainly used for track cycling events. The Saryarka Velodrome hosted the UCI Track Cycling World Cup stage in 2011. The Astana Presidential Sports Club was founded in 2012, to combine the main sports teams in Astana. The organization is supported by Sovereign Wealth Fund Samruk-Kazyna. The 2011 Asian Winter Games were partly held in the capital. The Alau Ice Palace, hosted the 2015 World Sprint Speed Skating Championships. The President's Cup tennis tournament is annually held at the Daulet National Tennis Centre.

The martial art palace was opened on 6 July 2019. Sports facilities for five thousand spectators can take part in international competitions in boxing, wrestling, judo, weightlifting, and other Olympic and non-Olympic disciplines. The palace has a 25-meter pool, fitness and wrestling rooms, a football field, as well as a comfortable hotel. The object will be made available to the pupils of the sports school.

== Education ==
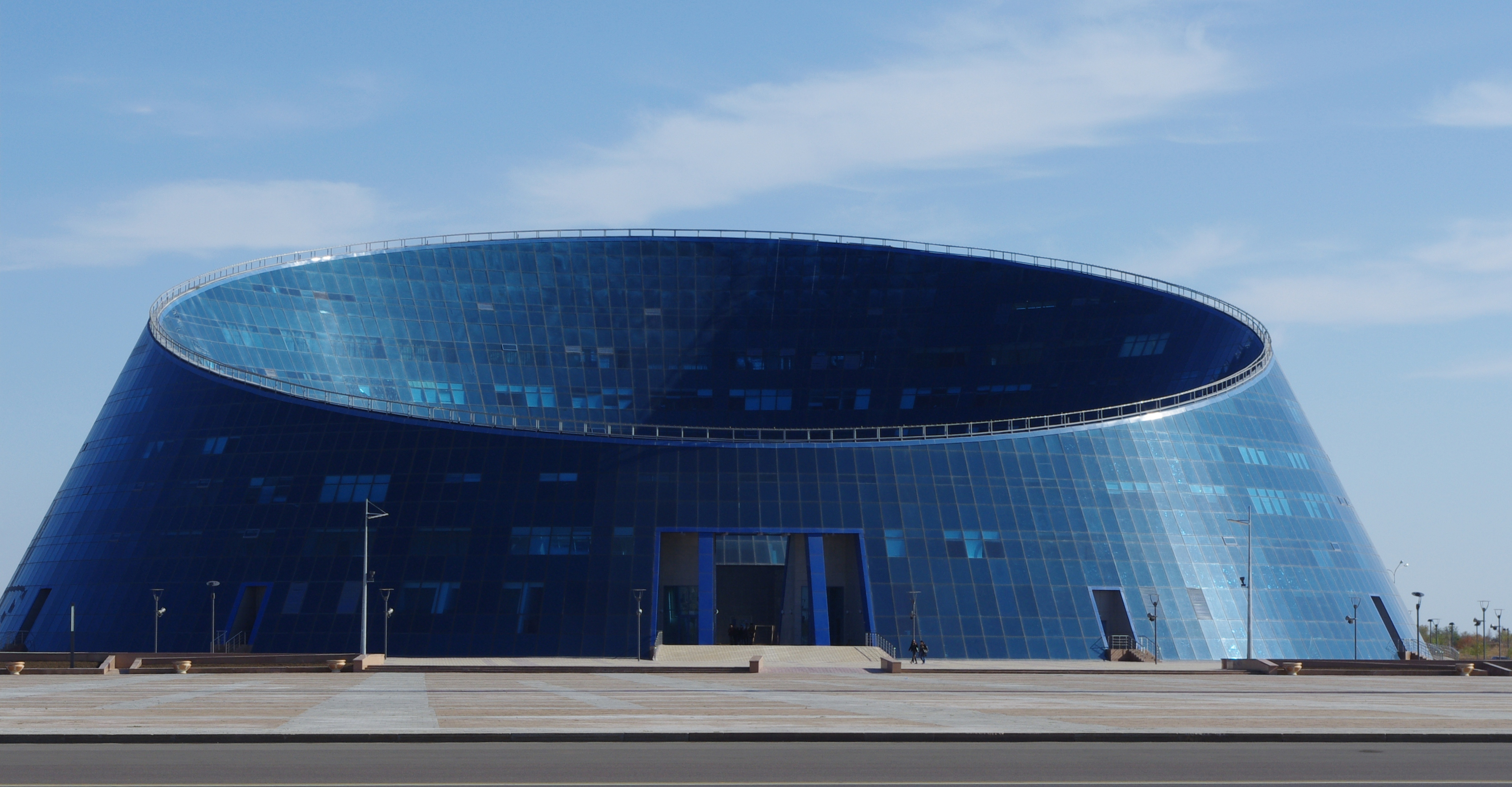
Kazakh National University of Arts

Astana is a predominantly Kazakh-speaking city. As of today, between 91.2% and 92% of the capital's residents have a good command of the Kazakh language. Additionally, 64% of Astana residents identify Kazakh as their primary language of communication in daily life and at home.Astana has numerous universities and junior colleges. In the 2013/2014 academic year, the city had a total of 53,561 students enrolled in its 14 higher education institutions, marking a 10% rise from the previous year. The L.N.Gumilyov Eurasian National University is the biggest university in Astana with 16,558 students and 1,678 academic staff. It was founded as the result of merging the Akmola Civil Engineering Institute with the Akmola Pedagogical Institute on 23 May 1996. The oldest university in Astana is the S. Seifullin Kazakh Agro Technical University founded in 1957. Nazarbayev University is an autonomous research university founded in 2010 in partnership with some of the world's top universities. The Kazakh University of Economics, Finance and International Trade is an economic institution in Astana. The Kazakh Humanities and Law Institute is a law university founded by initiative of Ministry of Justice in 1994. The Astana Medical University was the only medical school in Astana until the opening of the School of Medicine at Nazarbayev University in 2014. The Kazakh National University of Arts is the premier music school and has provided Astana with highly qualified professional specialists in the field of Arts.

Astana schools enrolls about 103,000 students across 83 schools, including 71 state schools and 12 private schools. The Miras International School, established 1999, was the first private high school established in Astana. The Haileybury Astana school was established in 2011, as a branch of the Haileybury and Imperial Service College, an independent school in the United Kingdom. The Astana Kazakh-Turkish High Schools are run by the International KATEV foundation. There are Kazakh-Turkish High Boarding Schools for gifted boys and girls, separately and the Nurorda International School. Astana hosts two Nazarbayev Intellectual Schools (NIS), including the School of Physics and Mathematics and International Baccalaureate world school. The QSI International School of Astana is an international school that provides an American curriculum to its students. The school is a branch of the Quality Schools International that started in the Middle East.

== Transportation ==
=== City transport ===
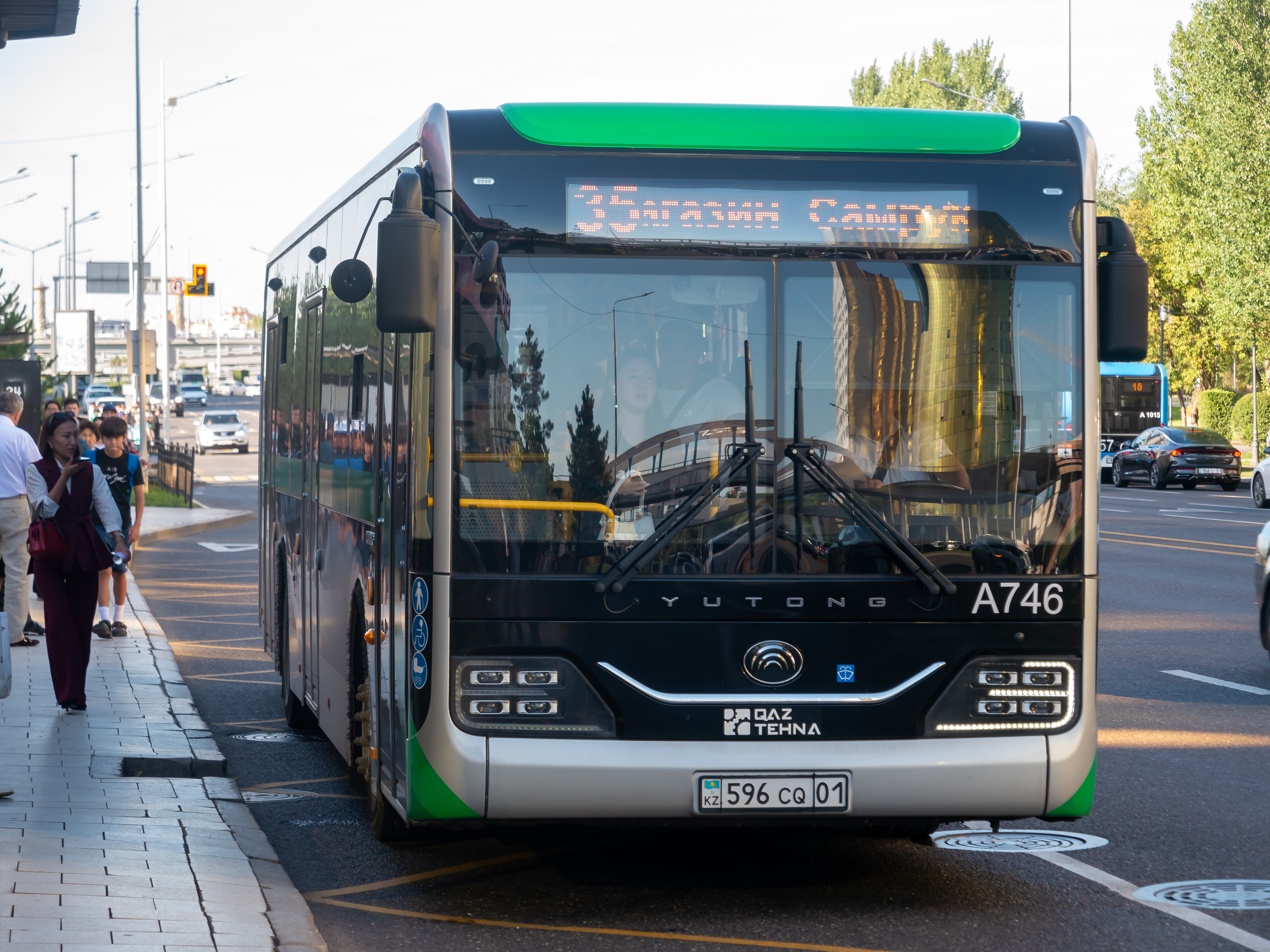
City bus in Astana

The city transport in Astana consists of buses and taxis. Over 720,000 people use public transport daily. There are over 60 bus lines served by more than 1000 vehicles, with over 3000 people working in the public transport sector. Just like buses, share taxis have their own predefined routes and work on a shared basis. There are three share taxi routes in total.

Trolleybus routes were opened in 1983. There were originally 3 routes, however, by 2006, only one route was left. In 2008, the only trolleybus fleet by the special state commission was declared unprofitable due to debts to the energy supply company and as a result, it was completely closed.

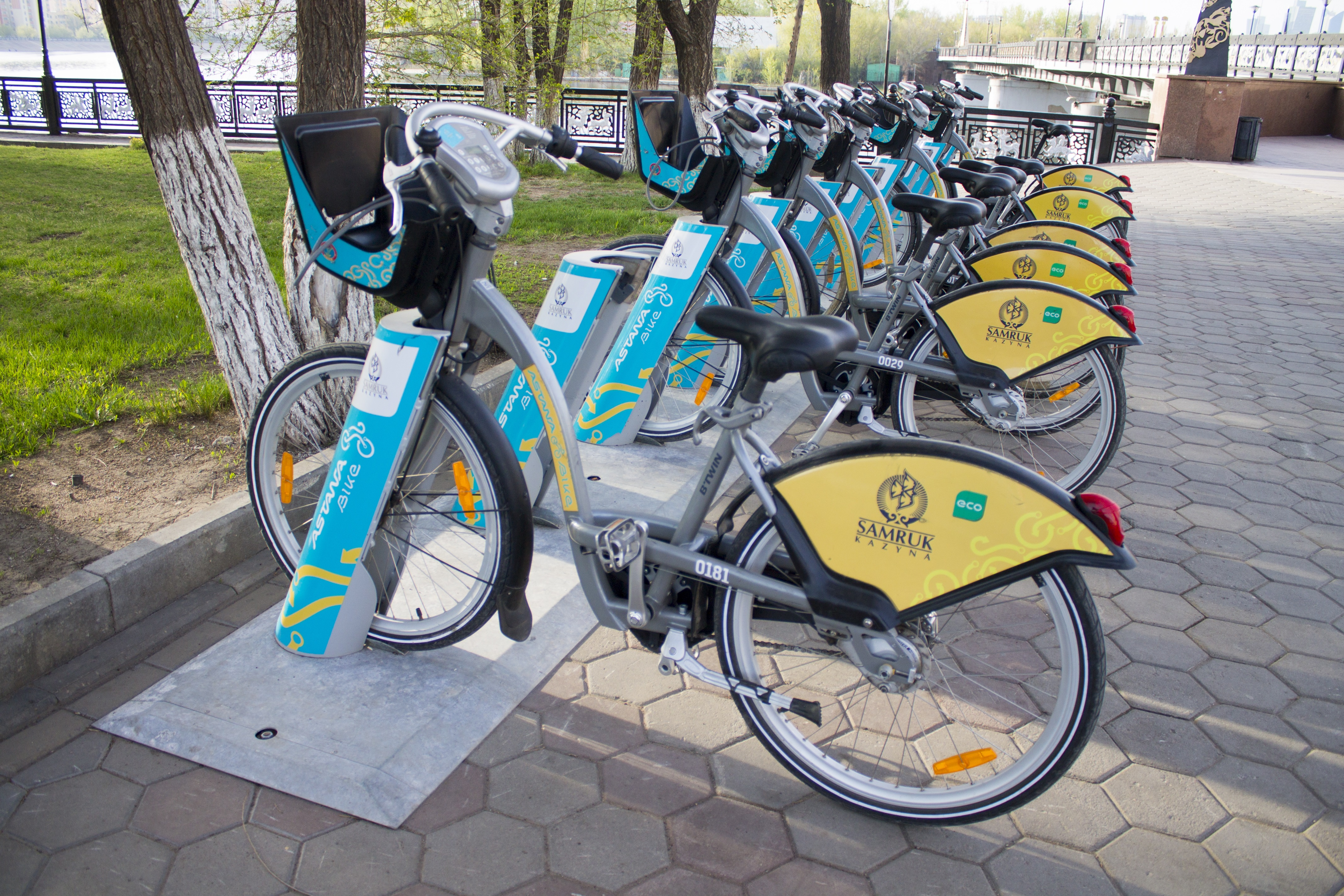
AstanaBike bicycle-sharing system

In 2011, the Akimat of Astana established a company to implement a series of changes and programmes in the metropolis known as the "New transport system of Astana". As part of these programmes, bus rapid transit (BRT) lines were opened. That same year, the construction of a light rail (LRT) was to begin. It was planned that the first stage of construction of a 16.4-kilometer line, which would've included nine stations, was planned to be completed by 1 December 2013. However, in November 2013, President Nursultan Nazarbayev condemned the construction of LRT because of the high cost. In exchange, there was a promise to launch high-speed buses. Despite the controversy, the construction of the LRT began in 2017 with the flyovers along to which the trains will pass.

The bicycle-sharing program AstanaBike has been operating in Astana since 2014. In 2017, the system consisted of 40 stations with 1000 bicycles.

=== Astana LRT ===
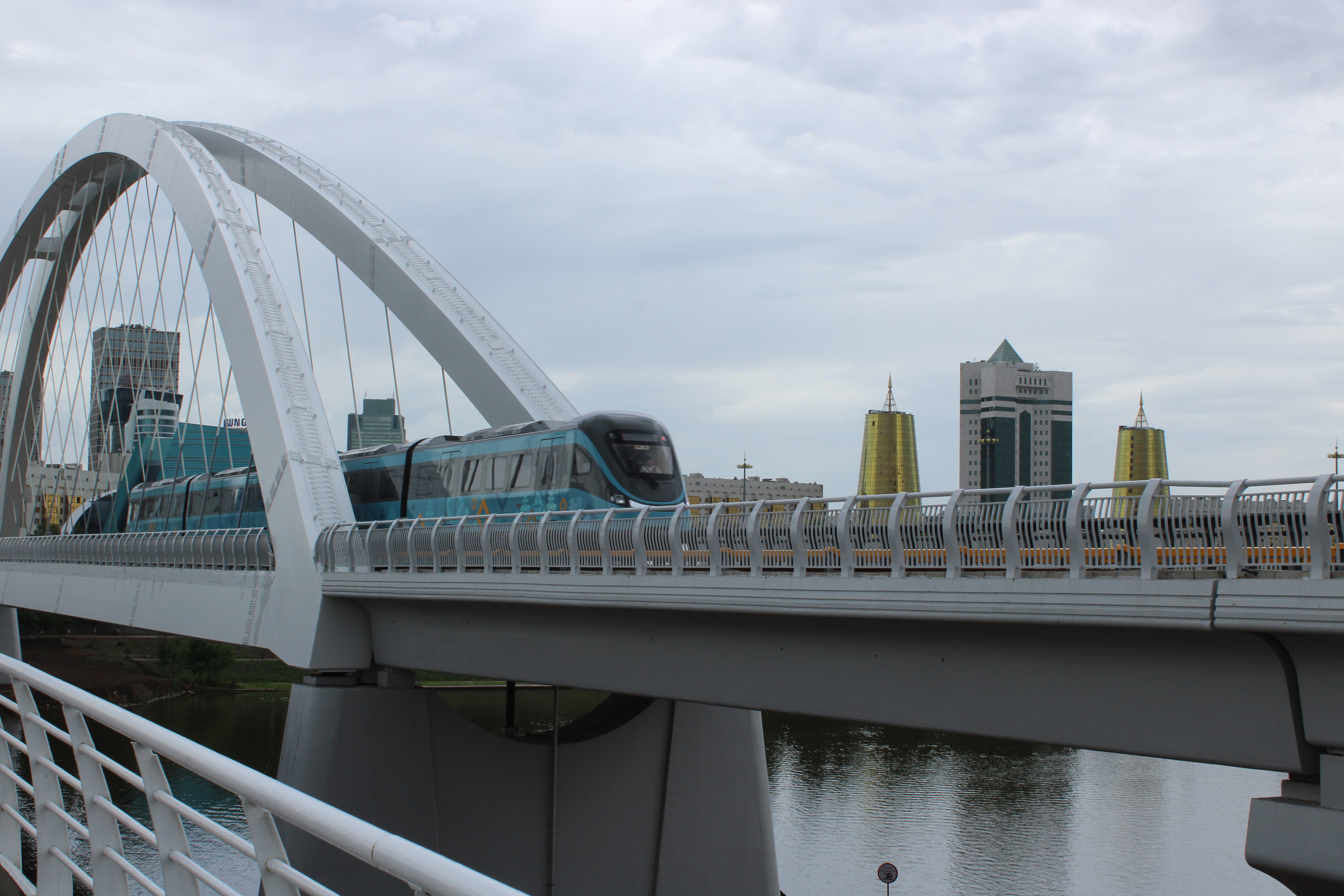
LRT train passes through the Syghanaq bridge

The Astana LRT, later renamed to Tarlan Astana, is an elevated light metro system, which is operated by City Transportation Systems, a public company owned by Akimat of the city of Astana. It consists of 18 stations along one line with a length of 22.4 kilometres (13.9 mi). It connects Nurly Zhol railway station with Nursultan Nazarbayev International Airport.

The construction of the LRT began in 2017. However, after a corruption scandal in 2019, the project stagnated. In 2023, construction resumed and the first line of the Astana Light Metro was officially opened on 16 May 2026.

The second phase of the Astana LRT is currently under construction and will connect satellite town of Qosshy with the capital.

The fare of one ride was set at 200 tenge. Tickets can be purchased from a dedicated ticket vending machine or by scanning a QR code in the Kaspi or Halyk Bank mobile app. Tickets can also be paid for using a bank card, which is read by the terminal.

On 2 July 2026, Astana LRT was renamed to Tarlan Astana, which means "fast horse" in Kazakh.

=== Air ===
Nursultan Nazarbayev International Airport

Nursultan Nazarbayev International Airport (IATA: NQZ, ICAO: UACC), located 17 kilometres (11 mi) south-east of the city center, is the main gateway for the city's domestic and international civilian air traffic. It is the second-busiest airport in Kazakhstan, with 8,315,108 passengers passing through it in 2024. The airport hosts 21 airlines operating regular passenger flights inside the country and internationally. Air Astana maintains its second-largest hub at the airport. An expected 50% increase in passenger traffic by 2017 has spurred the construction of a new terminal with an area of about 40,000 square metres (430,000 sq ft).

=== Railway and roads ===
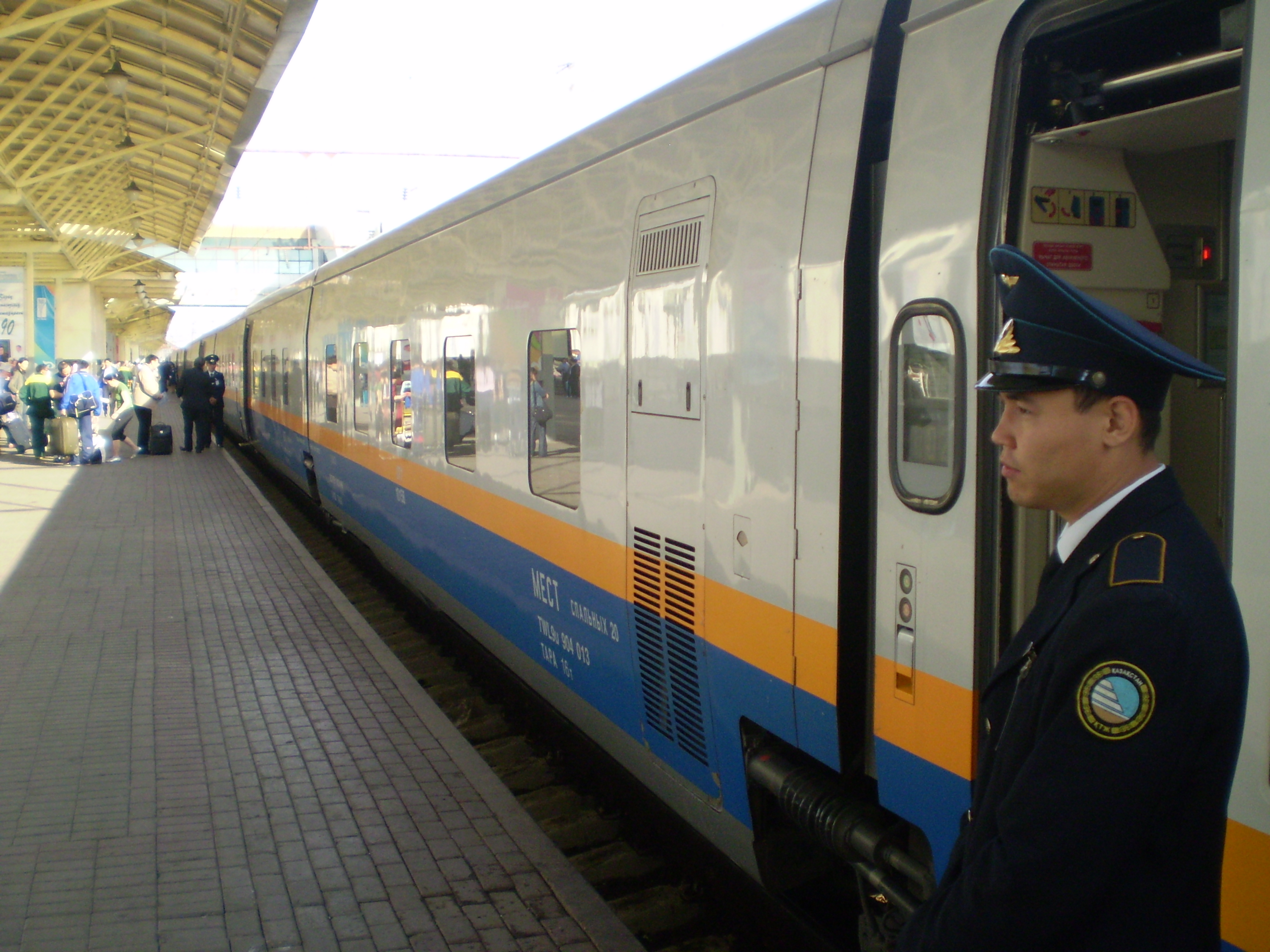
Tulpar Talgo express train to Almaty

Astana is located in the centre of the country, serving as a well-positioned transport node for rail and automotive networks.

Astana railway station is the city's main railway station and serves approximately 7,000 people each day. A new railway station, Nurly Zhol was built during the Expo 2017 event with a customer capacity of 12,000. Tulpar Talgo is a daily express train to Almaty. Short-term plans include the construction of a new railway station in the industrial district; in the vicinity of CHPP-3 a new terminal will be erected for freight cars.

M-36 Chelyabinsk-Almaty and A-343 Astana-Petropavlovsk highways are routed through the city. The strategic geographical positioning of Astana allows the city to serve as a transport and reload centre for cargoes formed at adjacent stations in the area.

=== River transport ===
Since 2008, navigation on the Esil River has been organized within the city. The Akimat of the city in the framework of the implementation of the "Shipping Esil" program created a specialized enterprise GKKP "Esil-Astana".

== Expo 2017 ==
On 1 July 2010, at the 153rd General Assembly of Bureau International des Expositions held in Paris, representatives from then-Astana presented the city's bid to host the Specialised Expo 2017. The Kazakh concept for this exhibition relates to the impact of energy on society in the modern world. The theme of the Astana Expo was "Future Energy".

Expo 2017 opened to much fanfare on 10 June 2017, with heads of state from 17 nations in attendance. It is the first world's fair to be held in Central Asia and its central pavilion, Nur Alem, is the largest spherical building in the world. The two-millionth visitor was registered on 7 August. More than 4 million people attended the event.

== Landmarks ==
Khan Shatyr Entertainment Center

- Akorda is the residence of the President of the Republic of Kazakhstan.
- Astana Grand Mosque – the largest mosque in Central Asia, completed in 2022.
- Baiterek is a 105 m (344 ft) tall observation tower built in 1996. It is a popular tourist attraction and was built to represent the transfer of the capital of Kazakhstan from Almaty to Astana.
- Gate of Eternal Land is a landmark architectural structure, erected in honour of the anniversary of independence of Kazakhstan on the idea of Nursultan Nazarbayev.
- Independence Palace – a building designed for diplomatic and other events of international level; the building also has a large-scale layout plan of Astana with existing and future facilities.
- Kazakh Eli – ("The Country of Kazakhs") – a monument on Independence Square. The 91-meter stele is crowned with the Samruk bird (Samұryқ, Simurg) – the king of all birds, the keeper of the peoples. The mythological image of Samruk also includes the second important monument of Kazakhstan – "Baiterek", in the translation "Tree of Life", under which the king of birds sits and spreads seeds on the ground from the flapping of wings.

National Museum of the Republic of Kazakhstan

- Khan Shatyr is the largest shopping and entertainment center (considered the largest tent in the world).
- Kazakhstan Pavilion and Science Museum "Nur Alem" is the tallest building with a spherical shape, 30 meters in diameter.
- Nurjol Boulevard (formerly Water-Green Boulevard) is a recreational pedestrian zone with an Alley of Singing Fountains.
- Palace of Peace and Reconciliation is the Congress Hall, designed for summits and congresses of representatives of traditional Kazakhstan and world religions.

Other landmarks include Central Concert Hall Kazakhstan, Astana Circus, and National Opera and Ballet Theater.

== Twin towns – sister cities ==
Astana is twinned with:

- Amman, Jordan (2005)
- Ankara, Turkey (2001)
- Ashgabat, Turkmenistan (2017)
- Bangkok, Thailand (2004)
- Beijing, China (2006)
- Bishkek, Kyrgyzstan (2011)
- Damascus, Syria
- Gdańsk, Poland (1996)
- Hanoi, Vietnam (2009)
- Islamabad, Pakistan
- Kazan, Russia (2004)
- Kyiv, Ukraine (1998)
- Manila, Philippines
- Moscow, Russia
- Nice, France (2013)
- Nusantara, Indonesia (2023)
- Oulu, Finland (2013)
- Putrajaya, Malaysia
- Riga, Latvia (1998)
- Saint Petersburg, Russia (1996)
- Seoul, South Korea (2004)
- Tashkent, Uzbekistan
- (Georgia (country)) Tbilisi, Georgia (1996)
- Ufa, Russia (2010)
- Ulaanbaatar, Mongolia (2019)
- Uşak, Turkey
- Vilnius, Lithuania
- Warsaw, Poland (2002)
- Zagreb, Croatia (2014)

=== Friendly cities ===
Astana also cooperates with:

- Baku, Azerbaijan
- Belgrade, Serbia
- Berlin, Germany
- Bucharest, Romania
- Budapest, Hungary
- Cairo, Egypt
- Chelyabinsk, Russia
- Chișinău, Moldova
- Kurgan, Russia
- Kursk, Russia
- Minsk, Belarus
- Omsk, Russia
- Penza, Russia
- Saratov, Russia
- Sverdlovsk Oblast, Russia
- Tomsk, Russia
- Ürümqi, China

== Smart city initiative ==
The Smart Astana project is an initiative developed by the then-Astana city administration that incorporates technology-driven solutions in various sectors, like hospitals, schools, the ticket booking system and street lighting. These projects run on an interconnected application, the Smart Astana.

Astana's smart city sector includes the annual Astana Innovations Challenge, designed to bring attention to the smart city concept.

The world's first smart sustainable city acceleration hub is set to open in Astana, planned to integrate from 10 to 15 startup solutions into the infrastructure of Kazakhstan.

== See also ==
- List of people from Astana
