= Astana Botanical Garden =

Botanical garden in Kazakhstan

- Астана ботаникалық бағы
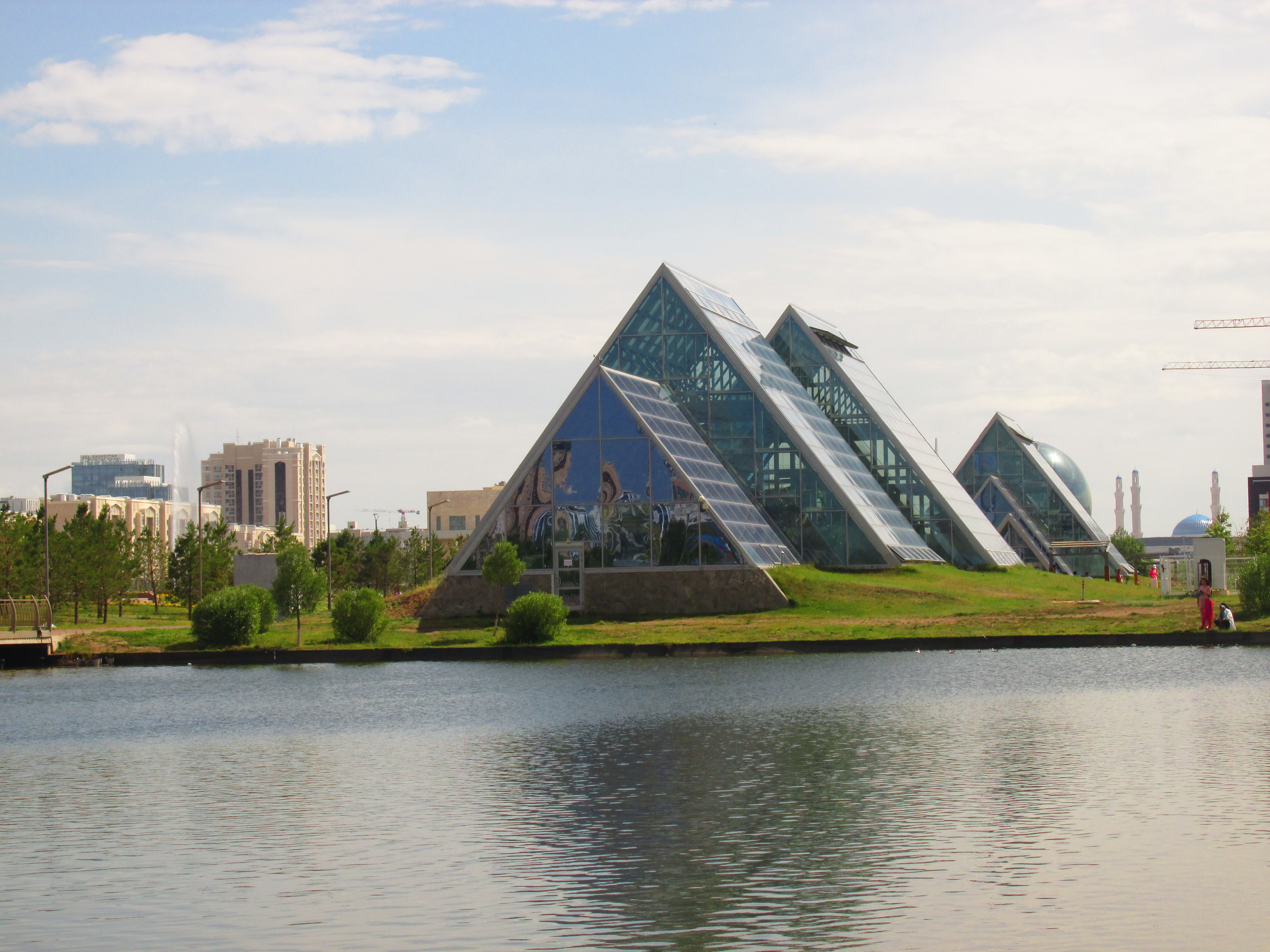
- Garden's greenhouses
- Interactive map of Astana Botanical Garden
- Type: Botanical
- Location: Astana, Kazakhstan
- Coordinates: 51.106°N 71.416°E
- Area: 92 hectares (230 acres)
- Opened: 2 July 2018
- Plants: 9000
- Budget: $35 million

The Astana Botanical Garden (Kazakh: Астана ботаникалық бағы, romanized: Astana botanikalyq bağy) is the largest botanical garden in the city of Astana, Kazakhstan, which features a pond with fountains and three bridges. About 9,000 trees and shrubs from Europe, Asia and North America have been planted, with bicycle and jogging paths laid among the green areas. The Botanical Garden is also used as a venue for city celebrations.

== History ==
The idea of creating a Botanical Garden in the city appeared at the end of the 2000s. In 2012, a large subbotnik took place, at which the Astana citizens, together with the President Nursultan Nazarbayev, planted the first batch of seedlings in front of the Astana Arena stadium.

The construction of the garden began in 2016 and was originally planned to be completed by the opening of Expo 2017. However it was delayed and eventually was opened on 2 July 2018 to coincide the 20th anniversary of Capital City Day. The opening ceremony was attended by President Nazarbayev. The cost of the project amounted to 23 billion tenge ($35 million), where about 12 billion tenge was allocated by private investments.

== Gallery ==
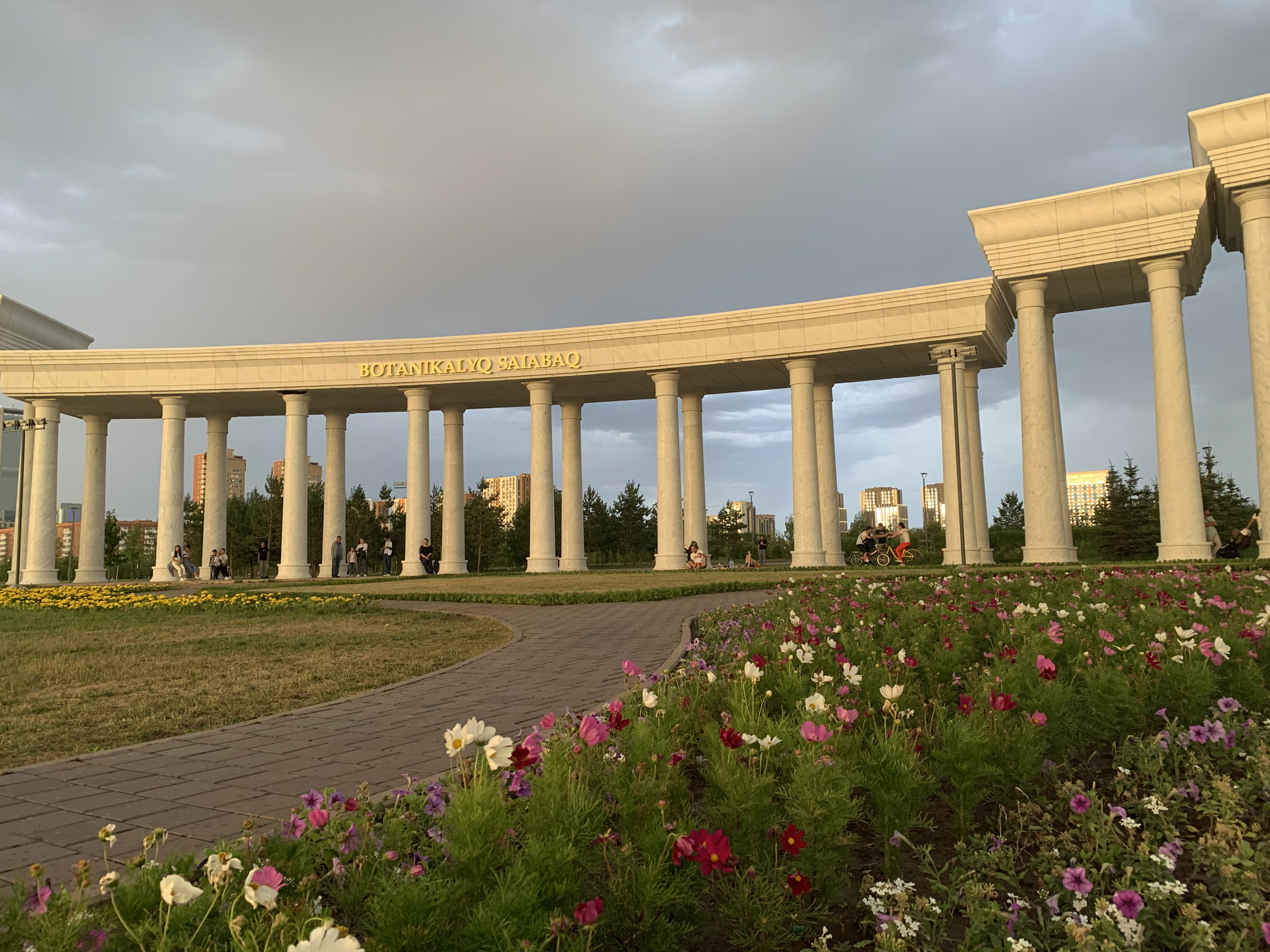

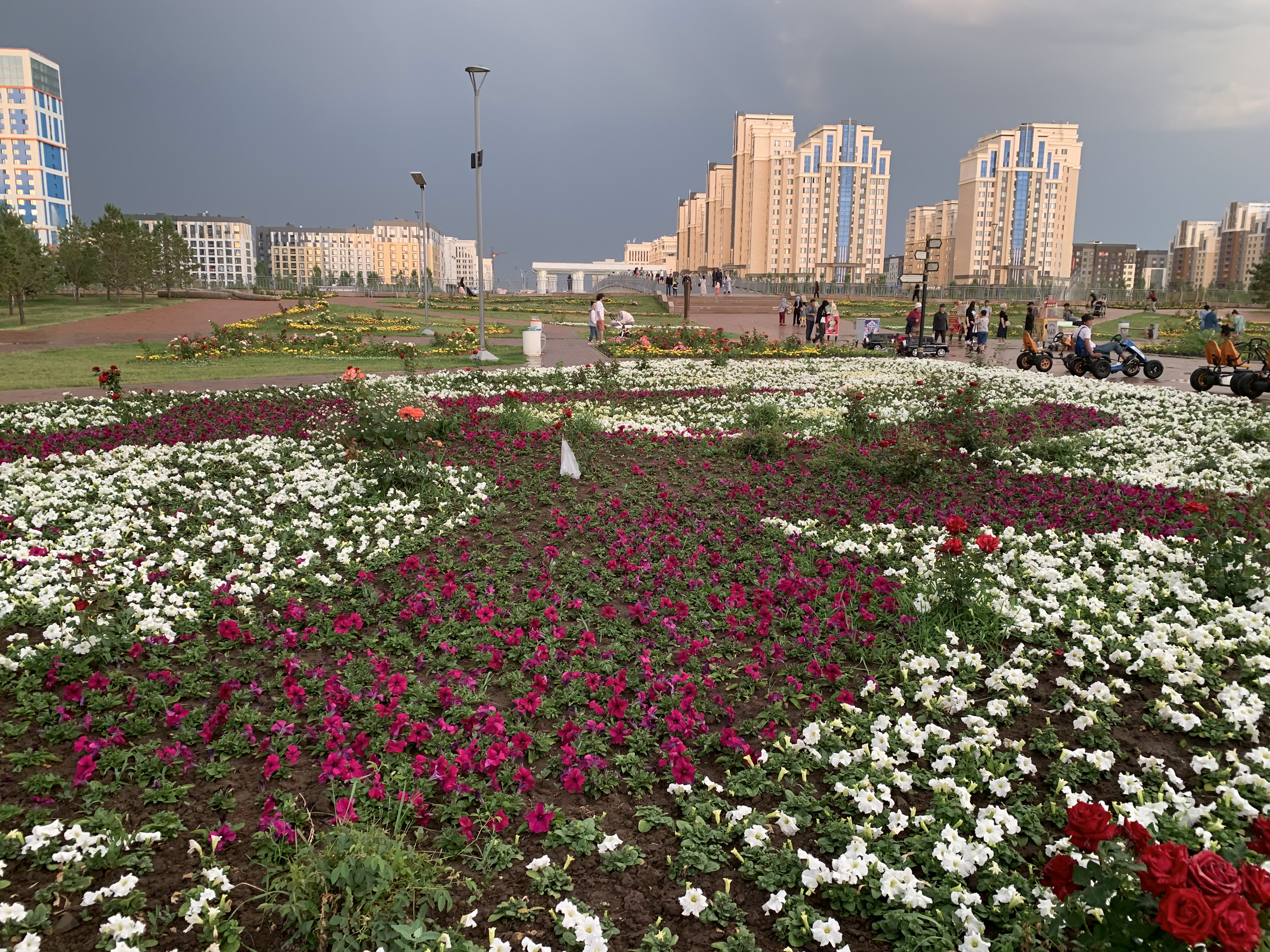

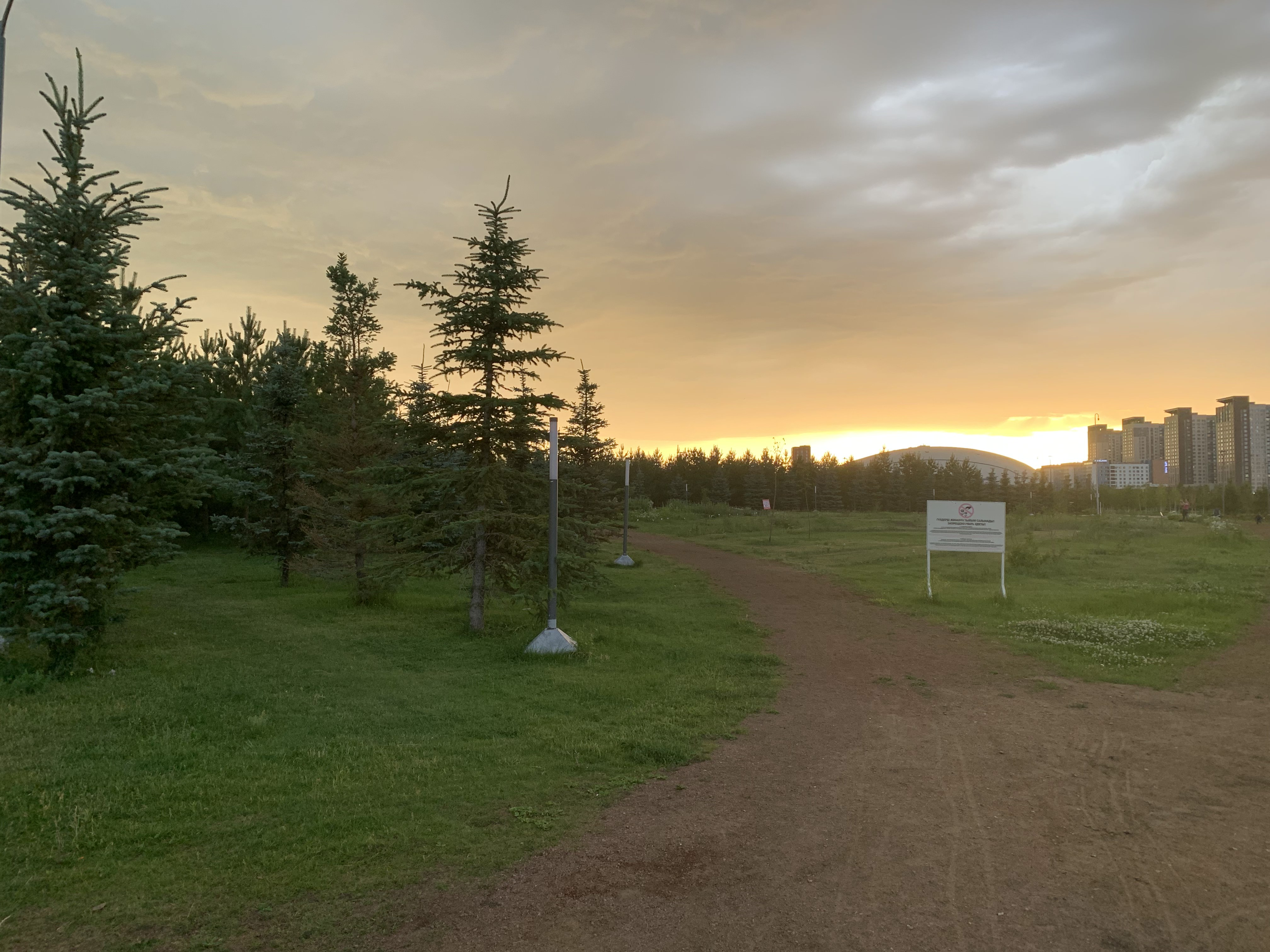
