= Baiterek (monument) =

Landmark observation tower in Astana, Kazakhstan

Baiterek tower
- Kazakh: Бәйтерек, Bäiterek; Russian: Байтерек
- Baiterek Tower
- Interactive map of the Baiterek tower area
- Alternative names: Bayterek

General information
- Status: Completed
- Type: Monument, observation tower
- Location: Astana, Kazakhstan
- Coordinates: 51°07′42″N 71°25′50″E
- Construction started: October 25, 1996
- Completed: August 30, 2002
- Renovated: 2017
- Owner: City of Astana

Height
- Antenna spire: 105 m (344 ft)
- Top floor: 97 m (318 ft)

Design and construction
- Architect: Akmurza Rustembekov
- Structural engineer: Mark Vaynshtein (chief structural engineer)

Baiterek (Kazakh: Бәйтерек, romanized: Bäiterek; "tall poplar tree") is a monument and observation tower in Astana, the capital city of Kazakhstan. A tourist attraction popular with foreign visitors and Kazakhs, it is emblematic of the city, which became capital of the country in 1997. The tower is located on Nurjol Boulevard, and is considered a symbol of post-independence Kazakhstan.

== History ==
The project was launched on the initiative of the first President of the Republic of Kazakhstan, Nursultan Nazarbayev, as part of the wider plan to create a new national capital in the steppe region. The project was commissioned in 1996 and realised by the Kazakh architect Akmurza Rustembekov.

According to Nursultan Nazarbayev’s memoirs, several proposals were considered for a landmark symbol of Kazakhstan’s new capital. For example, Zurab Tsereteli proposed constructing a 200-metre-high arch topped with a figure of a Golden Warrior. Arab architects suggested building a 200-metre spire with a large yurt-shaped structure at its base. The President ultimately chose the symbolism of the Baiterek, made a sketch of its approximate outlines, and submitted it to the Union of Architects of Kazakhstan, where a project was developed based on these contours. An important reason for selecting the domestic project was its cost: the estimated cost of the Baiterek was about $5 million, whereas Tsereteli’s project was estimated at $60 million.

== Design ==
The 105 meters tall structure rises from a wide flat base within a raised plaza. It consists of a narrow cylindrical shaft, surrounded by white branch-like girders that flare out near the top, supporting a gold-mirrored 22 meter diameter sphere. The base contains a ticket booth and exhibition space, with two lifts rising within the shaft to the observation deck within the 'egg'. Entrances to the monument are sunk below eye level, reached by stairs from the surrounding plaza.

The observation deck is 97 meters above ground level. It consists of two levels, one with 360 degree views of Astana and beyond, with a second, higher level, reached by a flight of stairs. The top level features a gilded hand print of the right hand of Nursultan Nazarbayev, the first President of independent Kazakhstan, mounted in an ornate pedestal. A plaque invites visitors to place a hand in the imprint and make a wish. Alongside the handprint, and also oriented in the direction of the presidential palace, is a wooden sculpture of a globe and 16 radiating segments, commemorating the Congress of Leaders of World and Traditional Religions, held several times in Astana, previously known as "Nur-sultan".

== Symbolism ==
The monument was built as a symbol of the transfer of the capital from Almaty to Astana in 1997.

The monument is meant to embody a folktale about a mythical tree of life and a magic bird of happiness: the bird, named Samruk, laid her egg in the crevice between two branches of the tree.

The significance of "Baiterek" as a symbol of a new stage in the life of the Kazakh people is emphasized by the artistic composition "Ayaly alakan" (Kazakh: Аялы алақан - "caring hands") with an imprint of the president's right hand, located at a height of 97 meters, which symbolizes 1997 - the year of the proclamation Astana as the new capital of the state and, accordingly, a new starting point in the history of the country.

== Photo gallery ==
Bayterek tower at night

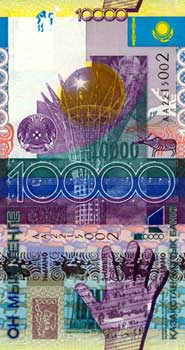
The 10,000 Kazakhstani tenge banknote showing the image of the Bayterek tower

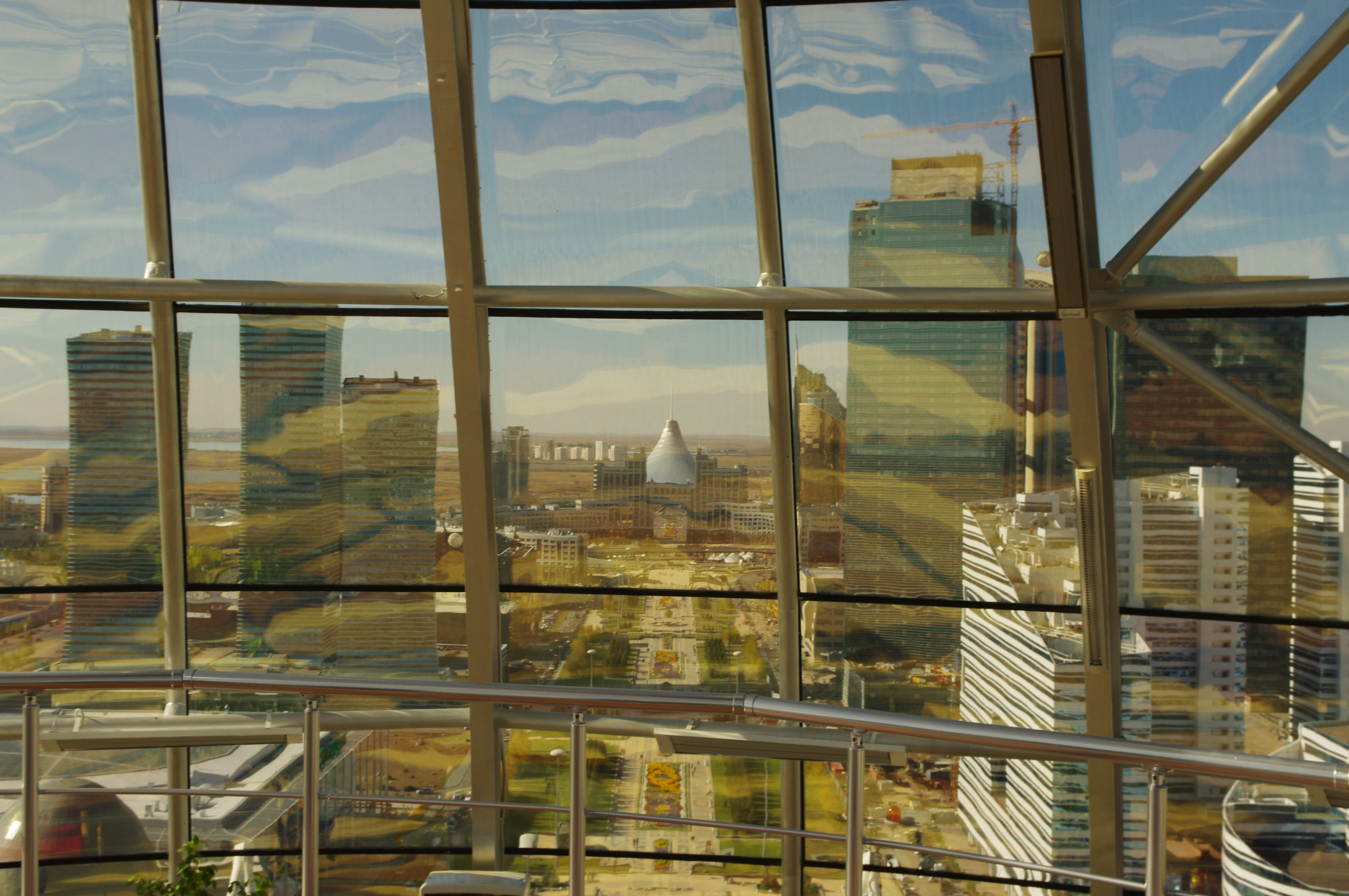
View from the top floor of Bayterek

Ground-level view of Bayterek tower

== See also ==
- History of Kazakhstan
