= Tourism in Kazakhstan =

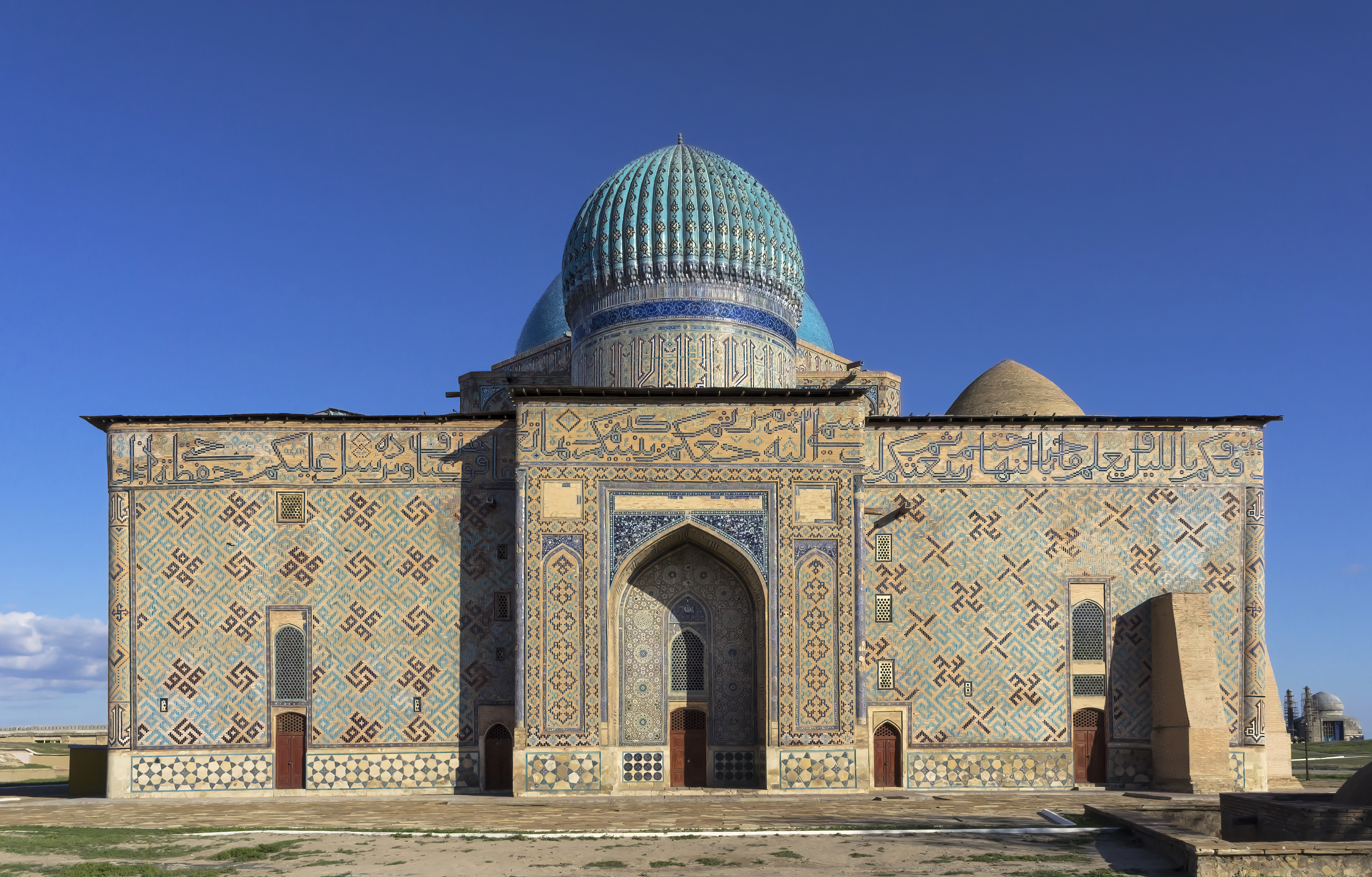
View of Mausoleum of Khoja Ahmed Yasawi

Number of international tourism arrivals in Kazakhstan

Kazakhstan is the ninth-largest country by area and the largest landlocked country in the world. Tourism is not a major component of the economy. As of 2014, tourism has accounted for 0.3% of Kazakhstan GDP, but the government had plans to increase it to 3% by 2020, however due to the COVID-19 pandemic it decreased to 0.34%.

According to the World Economic Forum's Travel and Tourism Competitiveness Report 2017, travel and tourism industry GDP in Kazakhstan is $3.08 billion or 1.6 percent of total GDP. The WEF ranks Kazakhstan 81st in its 2017 report, which is four positions higher compared to the previous period. Kazakhstan received 6.5 million tourists in 2016.

== Industry ==
In 2012, Kazakhstan ranked 51st in the world in terms of number of tourist arrivals. In 2000 total 1.47 million international tourists visited Kazakhstan, which was increased to 4.81 million in 2012. The Guardian describes tourism in Kazakhstan as, "hugely underdeveloped," despite the attractions of the country's dramatic mountain, lake and desert landscapes. Factors hampering an increase in tourist visits are said to include "shabby infrastructure," "poor service" and the logistical difficulties of travel in a geographically enormous, underdeveloped country. Even for locals, going for holiday abroad may cost only half the price of taking a holiday in Kazakhstan. High-end tourists like Britain's Prince Harry have visited for the skiing.

According to the UK consulting firm Brand Finance, Kazakhstan is one of the fastest growing nation brands of 2019. The country was ranked 44th in the 2019 report, which is 7 spots higher than in the previous year. According to the report, a good nation brand can help boost inbound tourism and promote economic cooperation with other countries.

=== Hong Kong Airlines ===
In April 2025, Hong Kong Airlines announced plans to launch passenger flights to Kazakhstan's largest cities, Almaty and Astana. This development was revealed during a visit by Kazakh Vice Minister of Transport Talgat Lastayev to Hong Kong International Airport on 29 April. The discussions, which included meetings with senior officials from the Hong Kong Transport and Logistics Bureau, Airport Authority Hong Kong, and major regional carriers such as Cathay Pacific, also highlighted Hong Kong International Airport's continued leadership in global air cargo, having ranked first worldwide for 14 consecutive years, handling 4.9 million tons of cargo in 2024.

=== Government initiative ===
The Kazakh Government, long characterized as authoritarian with a history of human rights abuses and suppression of political opposition, has started an initiative named the "Tourism Industry Development Plan 2020". This initiative aims to establish five tourism clusters in Kazakhstan: Astana city, Almaty city, East Kazakhstan, South Kazakhstan, and West Kazakhstan Oblasts. It also seeks investment of $4 billion and the creation of 300,000 new jobs in the tourism industry by 2020.

In May 1999 the Kazakhstan Tourism Association (President – Roza Asanbayeva) was founded with the approval of the President of Kazakhstan Nursultan Nazarbayev. KTA is a non-commercial, non-governmental organization including following members: the Kazakhstan Association of Hotels and Restaurants (Honour President – Kuat Tanysbayev), Amadeus computerized reservation systems, tour operators, insurance companies, airlines, universities and the media. The association's main objective is to protect the interests of over 400 members, by lobbying the government and promoting tourism within the national economy.

The 2006 comedy film Borat, which portrayed Kazakhstan as a comically backwards, racist and antisemitic country, resulted in an increase in tourism. The government banned the film and took out advertisements to defend the nation's honor. By contrast, upon the release of the sequel, Borat Subsequent Moviefilm, in 2020, the national tourism agency Kazakh Tourism adopted the film's catchphrase as its slogan – Kazakhstan. Very Nice! – and produced a number of videos featuring it.

In 2024, the Jibek Joly tourist train embarked on its inaugural, five day journey throughout Kazakhstan to Uzbekistan, as part of the government of Kazakhstan's tourism initiative. It began in Almaty, Kazakhstan, visited Turkistan, and finished in Tashkent, Uzbekistan. Alongside this, over 120 railway stations were renovated, and new airport terminals were constructed in Almaty, Shymkent, and Kyzylorda. Also in that year, the prime minister reported Kazakhstan received 15 million foreign visitors.

== Visa policy ==
Kazakhstan offers a permanent visa-free regime for up to 90 days to citizens of Armenia, Belarus, Georgia, Moldova, Kyrgyzstan, Mongolia, Russia and Ukraine and for up to 30 days to citizens of Argentina, Azerbaijan, Serbia, South Korea, Tajikistan, Turkey and Uzbekistan.

Kazakhstan established a visa-free regime for citizens of 45 countries including European Union and OECD member states, the US, UAE, South Korea, Australia and New Zealand.

In September 2020, Kazakhstan started issuing visas electronically. The country also expanded the list of countries whose citizens can get single-entry business visas, tourist visas and medical treatment visas online. The new list includes 109 states.

== Arrivals by country ==
Inbound tourism visitors to Kazakhstan by country (2025)
Rank	Country	Arrivals
1	Uzbekistan	5,590,148
2	Kyrgyzstan	3,545,711
3	Russia	3,502,587
4	China	961,627
5	Tajikistan	883,715
6	Belarus	167,115
7	India	157,845
8	Turkey	135,952
9	Azerbaijan	96,833
10	Germany	95,229
11	Turkmenistan	54,378
12	South Korea	50,906
13	Mongolia	42,905
14	United States	38,525
15	Ukraine	25,122
16	United Kingdom	24,292
17	Georgia	22,359
18	Philippines	20,389
19	Malaysia	19,138
20	United Arab Emirates	18,302
21	Iran	15,821
22	Oman	15,744
23	Italy	15,493
24	Armenia	15,452
25	France	15,120
Others		209,820
Total		15,740,528

Most visitors arriving to Kazakhstan were from the following countries of nationality:

Tourism to Kazakhstan by state, 2013–2024
Country	2024	2016	2015	2014	2013
Uzbekistan	▲5,873,312	▲2,459,757	▲2,297,180	▼2,107,177	▲2,494,568
Russia	▲3,255,076	▼1,587,409	▼1,646,568	▼1,757,721	▲1,780,574
Kyrgyzstan	▲3,366,936	▼1,348,709	▲1,359,625	▼1,308,139	▼1,382,706
Tajikistan	▲964,390	▲207,009	▲158,507	▼137,443	▲186,214
China	▲655,085	▲117,465	▼111,706	▲228,617	▲205,066
Azerbaijan	▲102,202	▲94,846	▲89,296	▼83,174	▲112,617
Germany	▲92,063	▲90,286	▲88,346	▲79,572	▼75,491
Turkey	▲129,595	▼89,611	▲106,301	▲104,986	▲92,070
Ukraine	▼24,519	▼73,390	▲97,100	▲84,932	▲82,971
Belarus	▲156,761	▲63,520	▲62,786	▲55,356	▲55,090
Turkmenistan	▼36,345	▼63,156	▲69,230	▲66,938	▲47,711
United States	▲35,958	▼26,402	▲29,124	▲25,824	▼22,508
Armenia	▼17,589	▼26,097	▼37,461	▼39,934	▲54,244
South Korea	▲40,178	▲22,276	▲22,046	▲20,445	▼16,620
United Kingdom	▲20,264	▼20,166	▲24,201	▲23,036	▼22,389
Total	▲15,262,368	▲6,509,390	▲6,430,158	▼6,332,734	▲6,841,085
