= Miras International School Astana =

Coordinates: 51°9′6″N 71°29′14″E

- Astana, Kazakhstan.

Information
- Established: September 2, 1999
- Grades: K–12
- Enrollment: 344

Miras International School Astana is a K–12 international school in Astana, Kazakhstan.

The school opened its doors in 1999 and became the first international school in Kazakhstan authorized for all stages of the International Baccalaureate Programme.

It includes a French section serving levels maternelle (preschool) through lycée (senior high school). It began classes in September 2011.
