= Nurjol Boulevard =

Street in Astana, Kazakhstan

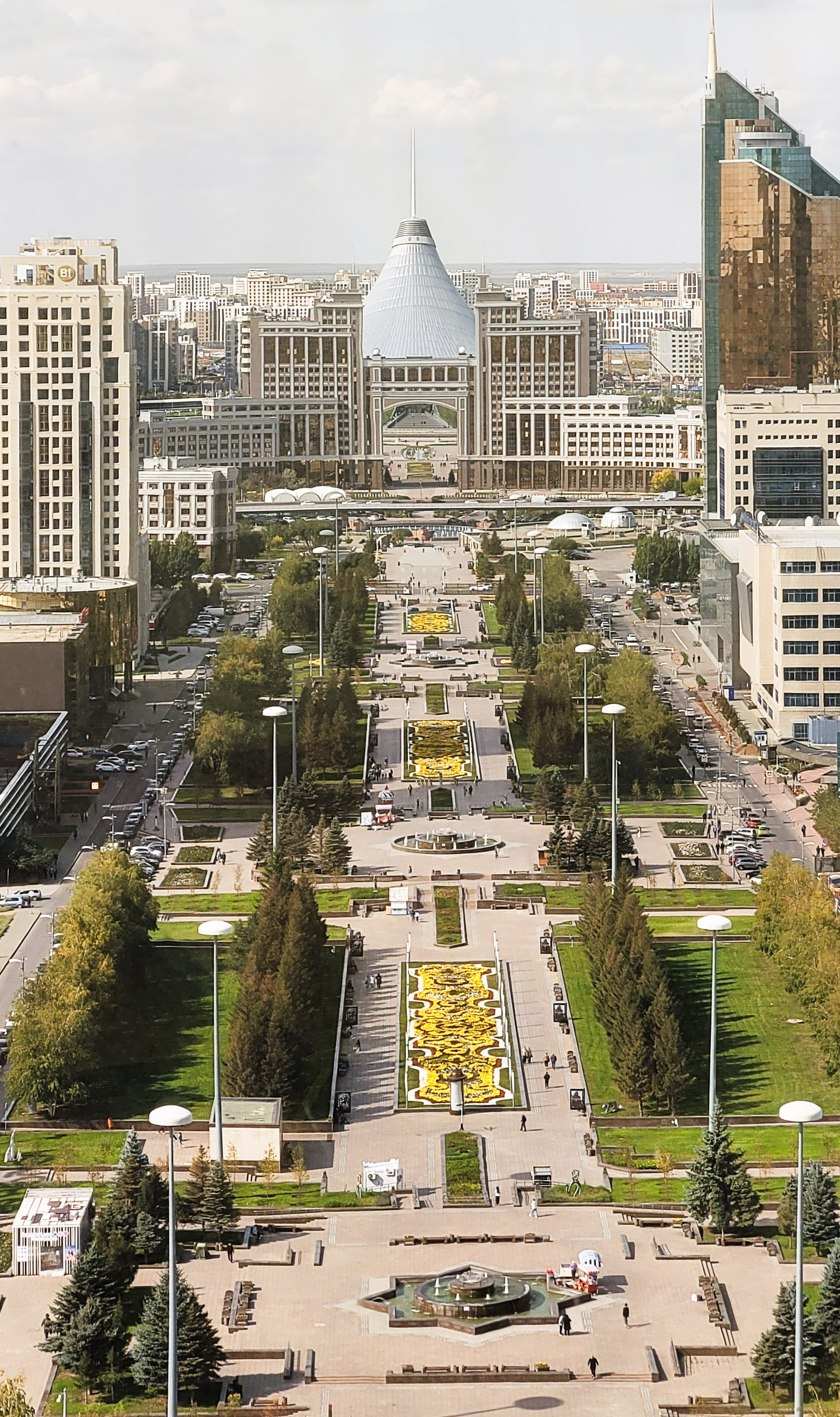
- Nurjol Boulevard viewed from the Baiterek Tower
- Native name: бульвар Нұржол (Kazakh)
- Former name(s): Suly nuly Boulevard
- Length: 2,200 m (7,200 ft)
- Location: Astana, Kazakhstan
- Coordinates: 51°7′37.95″N 71°26′13.01″E

Other
- Designer: Kisho Kurokawa

The Nurjol Boulevard (Kazakh: бульвар Нұржол, romanized: Bülvar Nūrjol), formerly known as Green Water Boulevard (Kazakh: сулы-нулы бульвар, romanized: Suly Nuly Bülvar) is a pedestrian zone in the business and administrative center on the left bank of Ishim river in Astana. The Boulevard is one of the main attractions of the city and country. Both Nurzhol Boulevard and the layout of the city were designed by a leading Japanese architect Kisho Kurokawa. The boulevard runs from the President's residence Ak Orda to the marquee-shaped Khan Shatyr Entertainment Center (Хан Шатыр).

Along the boulevard there is a row of buildings designed by well-known domestic and foreign architects, including the city's most recognisable structure, the Bayterek.

== Gallery ==
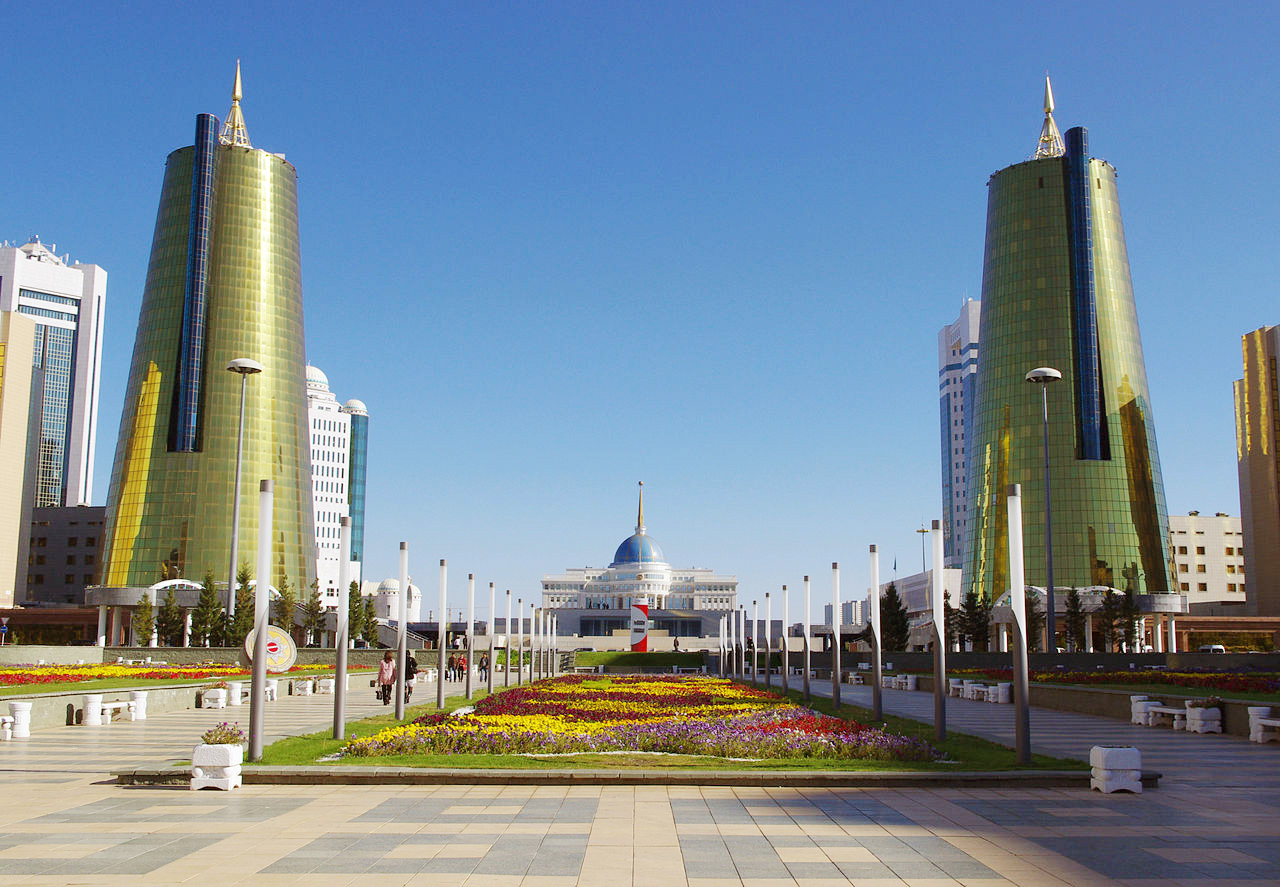

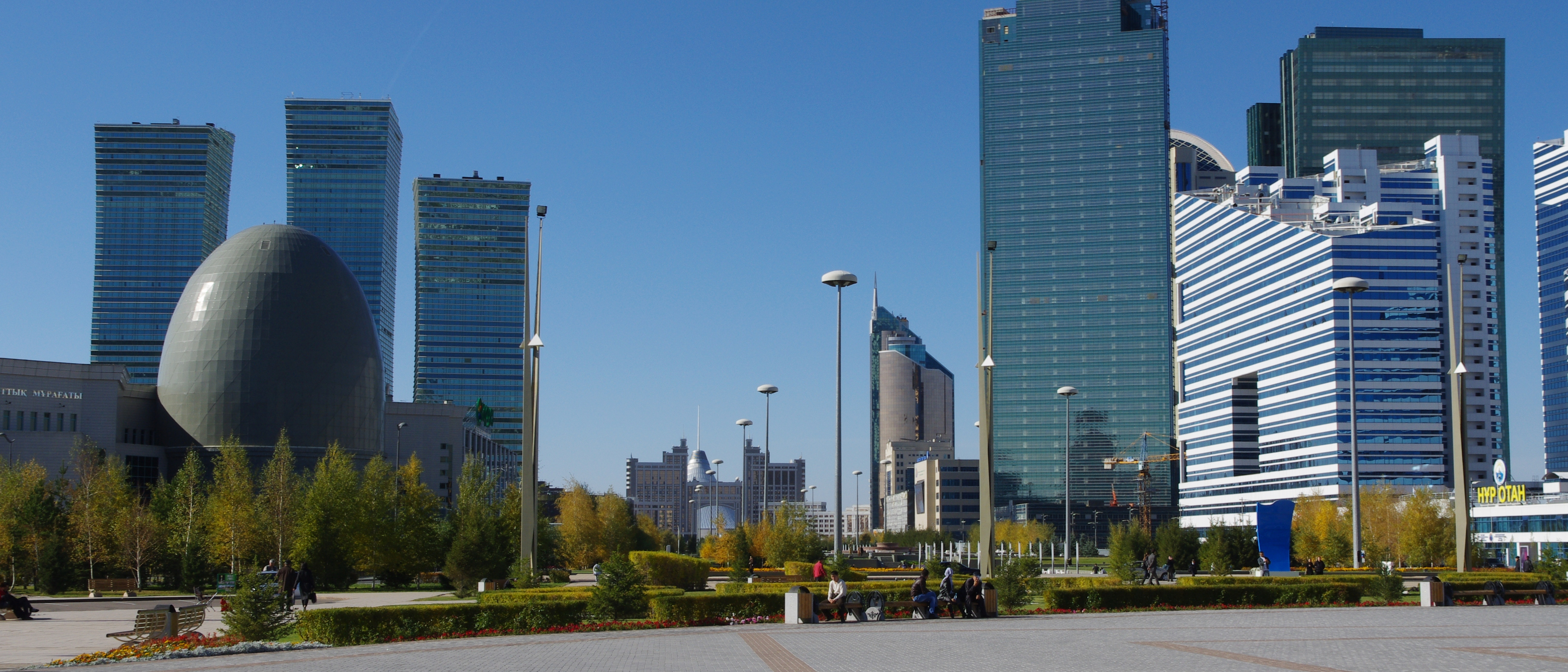
