= Nursultan Mosque =

Mosque in Astana, Kazakhstan

- Астана қаласының Орталық мешіті

- Location within Kazakhstan

Religion
- Affiliation: Islam
- Branch/tradition: Sunni

Location
- Location: Astana, Kazakhstan
- Country: Kazakhstan
- Coordinates: 51.0730°N 71.4105°E

Architecture
- Architects: Dewan Architects & Engineers
- Type: Mosque
- Groundbreaking: 2019
- Completed: 2022

Specifications
- Capacity: 235 000
- Height (max): 130 m
- Minaret: 4

Nursultan Mosque (Kazakh: Нұрсұлтан мешіті, romanized: Nūrsūltan meşıtı) is a mosque in Astana, Kazakhstan. It is the largest mosque in Central Asia, the second largest mosque outside the Middle East, and one of the largest in the world.

On March 18, 2019, the initiator of the project, President of Kazakhstan Nursultan Nazarbayev, laid the foundation stone at the site of the new mosque. The construction was funded by private investors, and no state budget funds were used. On August 12, 2022, the Grand Republican Mosque was officially inaugurated with the participation of Nazarbayev. On July 4, 2026, the mosque was officially named “Nursultan Mosque”.

The main dome of the mosque is the largest of its kind in the world.

The height of the dome is 83.2 metres (273 ft) with a diameter of 62 m (203 ft). The surrounding four minarets are 130 metres (430 ft) and are made of five parts to symbolize the five pillars of Islam – faith, prayer, fasting, zakat and pilgrimage. One of the towers in the left wing has been opened to the public. Guests can take an elevator up and admire the view of the city.

The entrance door of the mosque is considered one of the tallest wooden doors in the world, standing at 12.4 m (41 ft) with a weight of one and a half tons. The material is made of hard iroko wood, which grows in tropical Africa. The doors are decorated with Kazakh patterns and the outer walls with white Arabic script on a blue background.

The interior doors of the mosque are 12 m (39 ft) high and the windows are made of handmade stained glass with colorful ornaments.

The walls of the mosque and the inside of the dome are decorated with colorful patterns, verses from the Quran and prayers. The Arabic calligraphy was illustrated by Kazakh master Asylbek Baizakuly.

The wall on the side facing the qibla is inscribed with the 99 names of Allah, illuminated with golden light from within. The mosaic wall is 100 m (330 ft) long and 22.4 m (73 ft) high and consists of 25 million glasses of different colors.

The big hall and the women's prayer zone are fully covered with Kazakh ornamental carpets. The total area of the carpet is 15,525 m^{2} (167,110 ft^{2}), making it the largest handmade carpet in the world.

== Gallery ==
Exterior

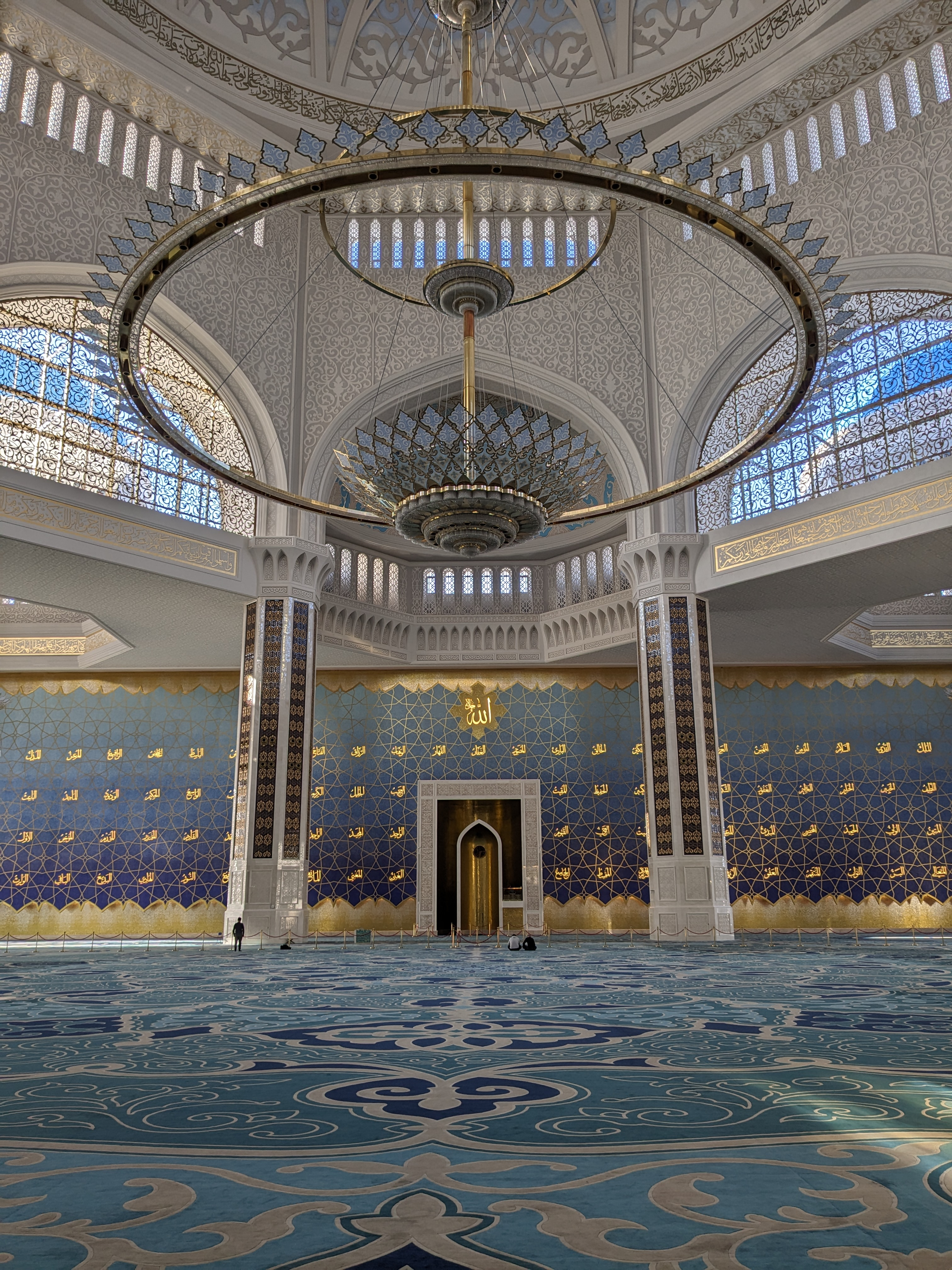
Main prayer hall

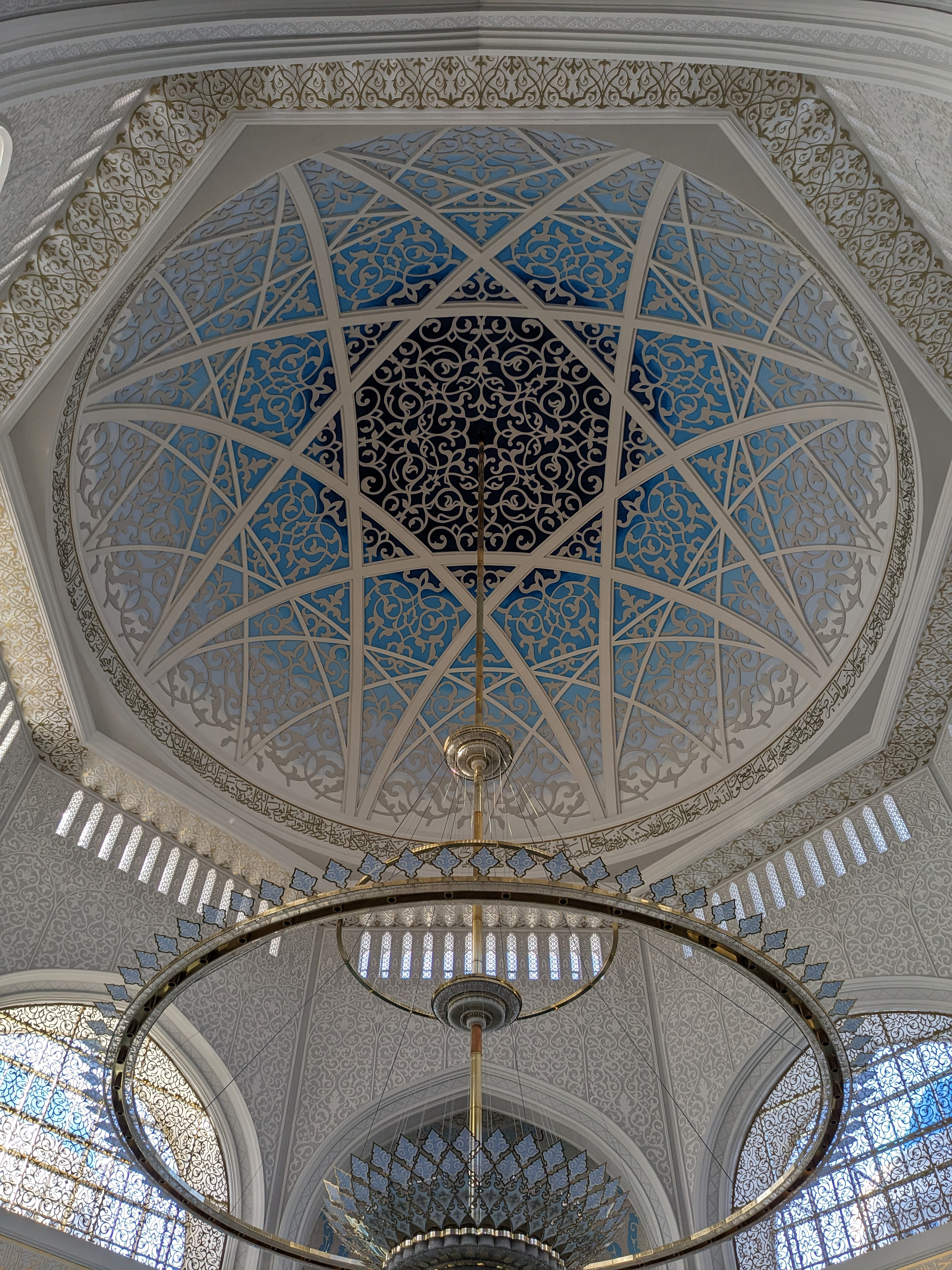
Interior dome decoration

== See also ==
- Islam in Kazakhstan
