= Capital relocation in Kazakhstan =

The relocation of Kazakhstan’s capital from Almaty to Akmola marked the third capital relocation in Kazakhstan’s history and the first in independent Kazakhstan. It was also the only capital relocation in the post-Soviet space, significantly impacting the country’s economic and demographic landscape. President Nursultan Nazarbayev was the initiator of this move.

== Reasons for Relocation ==
According to Nursultan Nazarbayev’s recollections, the idea of building a new capital first occurred to him in the early months of independence in 1992. After gaining independence, Kazakhstan faced potential issues with Almaty’s location, far away from other regions. There were even isolated separatist sentiments in some areas, and moving the capital was seen as a solution to certain national security concerns. Almaty’s location in a basin limited its expansion due to the surrounding mountains, and by the early 1990s, the city had little space left for growth. Additionally, Almaty’s location in a seismic zone posed a significant risk of destructive earthquakes.

For security reasons, the capital of an independent Kazakhstan needed to be situated far from external borders, closer to the center of the country. Ensuring the safety and efficiency of top state institutions in the event of regional unrest was also a priority.

When selecting a new capital, Nazarbayev considered 32 criteria, including socioeconomic potential, climate, topography, seismic activity, environmental conditions, engineering and transportation infrastructure, communications, construction facilities, and workforce availability. Cities like Ulytau, Karaganda, Kokshetau, and Aktobe were considered. Ulytau was quickly ruled out due to water scarcity, lack of rail connections, and its remote location. Karaganda and Kokshetau were eliminated due to weak infrastructure, and Aktobe was ruled out because it was too far from the center of the country.

A special commission appointed by the president selected Akmola for its proximity to major economic regions that drive Kazakhstan’s economy. This choice allowed for a balanced regional demographic, promoted migration from overpopulated southern regions to the more industrially developed northern cities, and encouraged people to engage in industrial and agricultural production in Central and Northern Kazakhstan. Other advantages of Akmola included its location at a major road junction, its compact size, an adequate water supply, and sufficient undeveloped land for construction and architectural planning. The city’s center alone had around 30 hectares of available land for necessary infrastructure, allowing easy connection to existing utilities.

== History of the Capital Relocation ==
The idea of relocating the capital was first introduced by President Nursultan Nazarbayev in a public address. As he recalls:

At first, I shared this idea with a small circle of elites. To say that members of the government and parliament were surprised is an understatement. My announcement was met with smiles, and perhaps even laughter behind my back. Knowing that I don’t make idle remarks, many took the idea of relocation as a bad joke. In one of my speeches at the end of 1993, I cautiously suggested moving the capital from Almaty to another city, testing the waters. Many in the audience likely thought I had misspoken or was tired from intense work… In early 1994, I repeated the idea, but again it was taken as an inappropriate joke. People laughed and assumed it would be forgotten.

On July 6, 1994, Nazarbayev formally proposed the capital relocation to the Supreme Council of Kazakhstan. The president argued that while relocation costs would be significant, they represented an investment in the country’s future. The debate in parliament lasted all day, with opinions divided. Some deputies supported the president’s view, others argued that changing the capital was inappropriate during an economic crisis when people’s wages were delayed, and a third group supported the idea but suggested postponing it. Supreme Council Chairman Abish Kekilbayev described the debate as follows:

The usual hum in the hall quickly subsided as they prepared to listen. President Nazarbayev himself made the announcement. There was complete silence; everyone was listening intently. The president was thoroughly prepared. He answered the barrage of questions clearly and in-depth. Some questions were sarcastic and probing, with many searching for a hidden agenda. Some suspected geopolitical motives, while others attributed the proposal to daily concerns or political ambitions. The president patiently responded to all the sharp questions, explaining the matter in scrupulous detail. Even seasoned politicians seemed uneasy, noticeably nervous. Many could not fathom leaving the green beauty of Almaty and the majestic Alatau mountains for a shabby, soot-covered town in the steppe with its fierce blizzards and freezing winters. I won’t hide it—I, too, was more inclined to agree with them.

In the end, the proposal to relocate the capital was put to a vote and passed by the Supreme Council on July 6, 1994, with a narrow majority. July 6 is now celebrated in Kazakhstan as Capital City Day.

On September 15, 1995, Nazarbayev issued a decree with the force of law On the Capital of the Republic of Kazakhstan, establishing a State Commission to coordinate the relocation of higher and central government bodies to Akmola, headed by Nikolai Makeyevskiy. The government of Kazakhstan was tasked with creating an off-budget New Capital fund to attract investments for the development of Akmola and preparing proposals for tax, customs, and other incentives for investors participating in the city’s construction and infrastructure development.

On October 20, 1997, the president issued a decree declaring Akmola as the capital of Kazakhstan, effective December 10, 1997.

On May 6, 1998, the capital was renamed Astana. The international presentation of Astana as the new capital took place on June 10, 1998.
