= Vladimir Laptev =

Russian politician (1945–2025)

Vladimir Nikolayevich Laptev (Russian: Влади́мир Никола́евич Ла́птев; 26 November 1945 – 4 October 2025) was a Russian politician who was the Head of the Administration of Noginsky District, Moscow Oblast. He died on 4 October 2025, at the age of 79.
