= Kokshetau =

City in Akmola Region, Kazakhstan

Kokshetau Kökşetau (Kazakh)
- City

Official Cyrillic transcription(s)
  - Kazakh: Көкшетау
  - Russian: Кокшетау
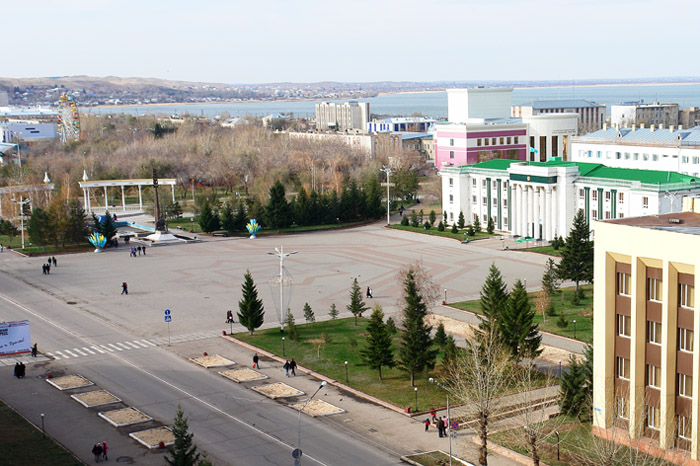
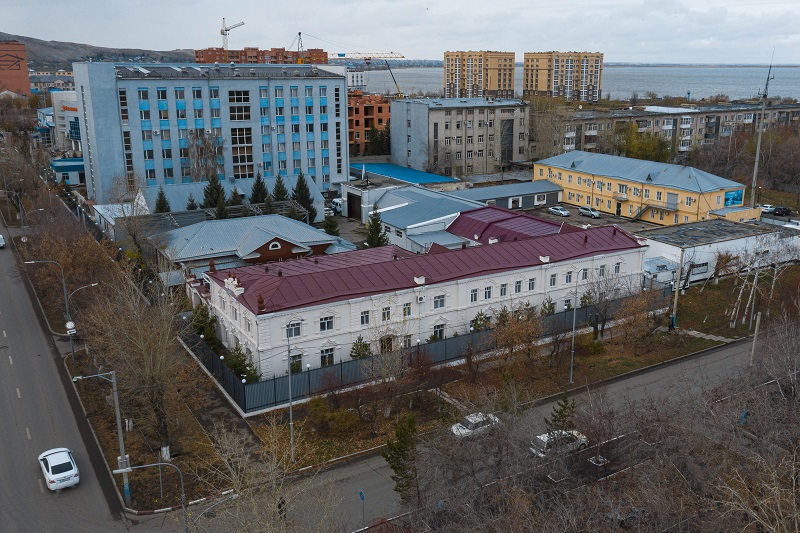
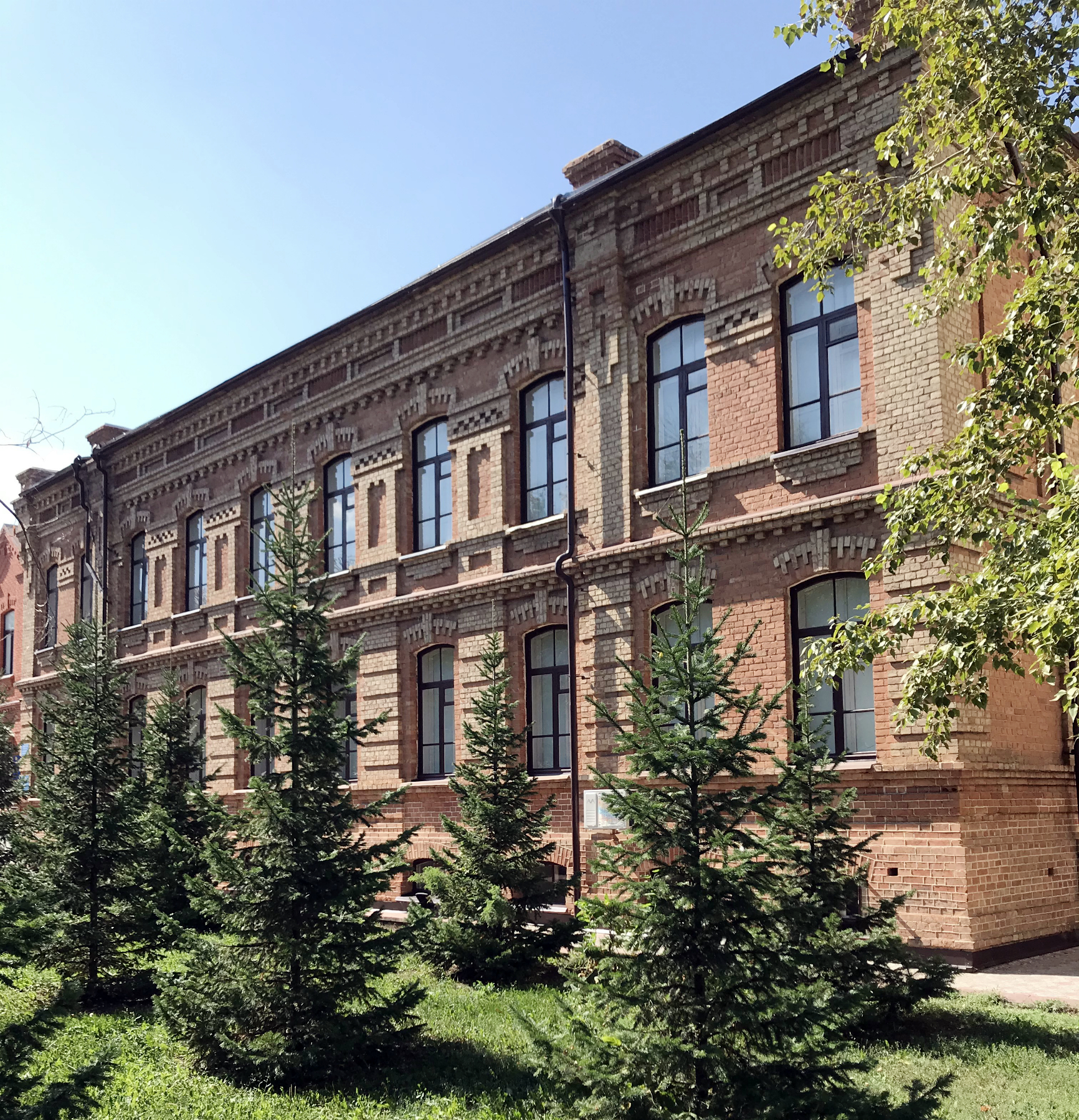
- Skyline of Kokshetau with the city's central Abylai Khan Square in the foreground Historical center of Kokshetau Akmola Regional Museum of History and Local Lore

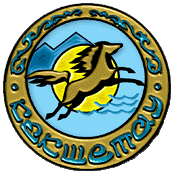
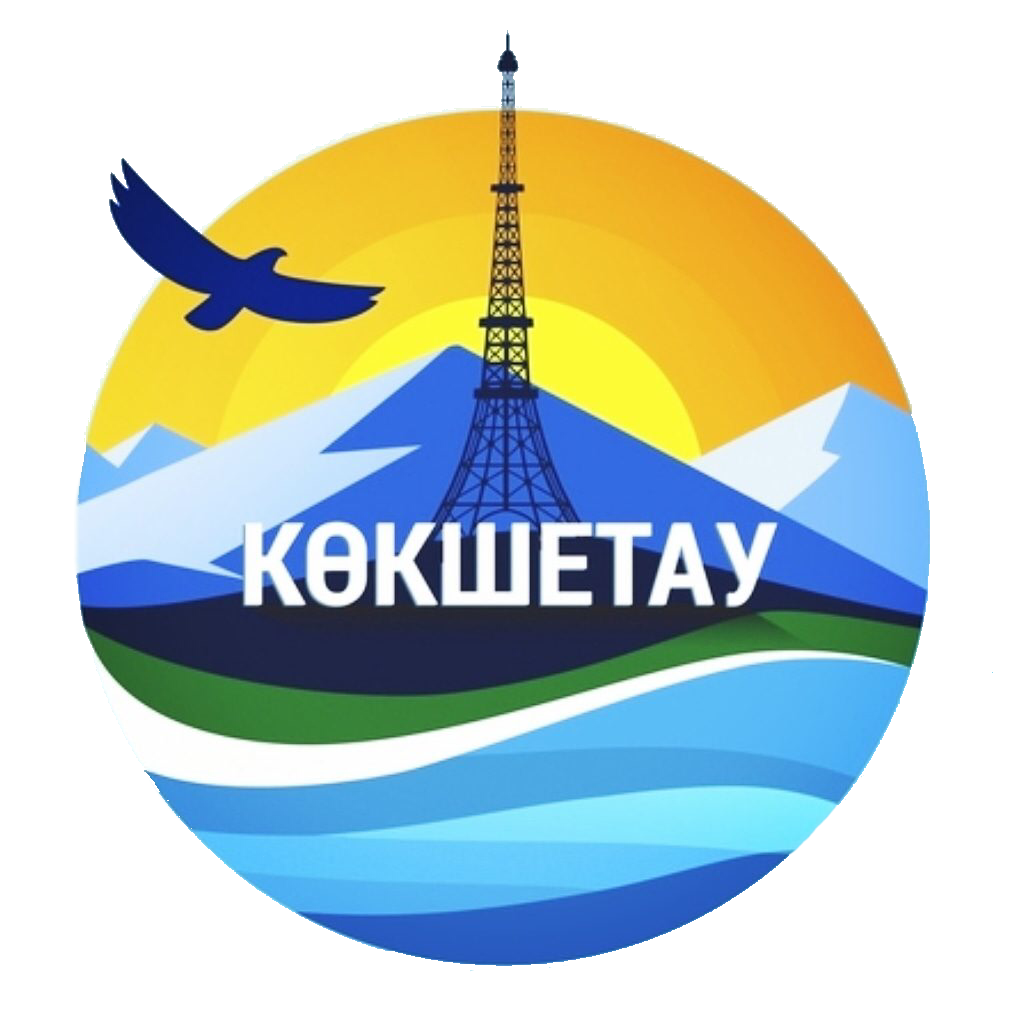
- Coat of arms Brandmark
- Nickname: 7162
- Anthem: none
- Interactive map of Kokshetau
- Location of Kokshetau in Kazakhstan Kokshetau (Asia)
- Coordinates: 53°17′N 69°23′E
- Country: Kazakhstan
- Region: Akmola Region
- Founded: 19th century (29 April 1824)
- City status since: 1895; 131 years ago

Government
  - Akim (mayor): Anuar Kumpekeev

Area
  - City: 234 km^{2} (90 sq mi)
  - Urban: 425 km^{2} (164 sq mi)
- Elevation: 234 m (768 ft)

Population (2024 est.)
  - City: 176,849
  - Rank: 17th in Kazakhstan; 1st in Akmola Region
  - Density: 624/km^{2} (1,620/sq mi)
  - Urban: 193,492
- Demonym(s): Көкшетаулық (kk, singular); Кокшетауцы (ru, plural); Кокшетауец (ru, male); Кокшетаука (ru, female)

Demographics (2022 est.)
  - Kazakhs: 59.34%
  - Russians: 28.38%
  - Ukrainians: 2.75%
  - Tatars: 2.22%
  - Germans: 1.98%
  - Poles: 1.35%
  - Ingush: 1.06%
  - Other: 2.92%
- Time zone: UTC+05:00 (Kazakhstan Time)
- Postal code: 020000–020010
- Area code: +7-7162
- Vehicle registration: 03 (region) (before 2012: C – on older plates)
- Sister cities: Waukesha, Wisconsin
- Climate: BSk
- Highways: A1; A13
- International airports: Kokshetau (KOV)
- Major railway stations: Kokshetau-1 station
- KATO ID: 111010000
- HDI (2022): 0.816 very high · 3rd
- GDP (nominal): 2023
  - Total: ▲$8,0 billion (KZT 3 685 297,6 million)
  - Per capita: ▲$10,173 (KZT 4 676,7 thousand)
- Website: www.kokshetau.kz

Kokshetau, (Note: Kazakh: Көкшетау, romanized: Kökşetau, pronounced [kʰɵkʃʲetʰɑ́w]; lit. 'Blue Mountain'; Russian: Кокшетау, romanized: Kokshetau, pronounced [kəkʂiˈtaʊ]; English: /ˌkɒkʃɪˈtaʊ/ KOK-shit-OW) formerly known as Kokchetav, (Note: Russian: Кокчетав [kəktɕeˈtaf]; English: /ˌkɒktʃɪˈtæv/ KOK-chit-AV) between 1868 and 1993, is a lakeside city in northern Kazakhstan and the capital of Akmola Region. It stretches along the southern shore of Lake Kopa, lying in the north of Kokshetau Hills, a northern subsystem of the Kokshetau Uplands (Saryarka) and the southern edge of the Ishim Steppe. It is named after Mount Kokshe.

Kokshetau is the 17th-most populous city in Kazakhstan, the 4th-most populous city in northern part of the country, and the largest city in Akmola Region. It was the administrative center of Kokshetau Region (oblast) from 1944 to 1991 as part of the Soviet Union and from 1991 as part of Kazakhstan to 1997 when it was abolished. It is also situated at the junction of the Trans-Kazakhstan and South Siberian railways. Kokshetau lies at an elevation of approximately 234 m (768 ft) above sea level. The climate of Kokshetau features hot summers and cold winters.

It has 183,170 inhabitants (2026 est.), up from 123,389 (1999 census), while Akmola Region had a total population of 738,587 (2019 est.), down from 1,061,820 (1989 census), making it the tenth most populous region in Kazakhstan. The city's history has been influenced by people of many nations and religions. Kokshetau retains multiethnic population, with 59% ethnic Kazakhs (up from 36%), the rest being mostly 28% ethnic Russians (down from 42%) and other ethnic groups such as Ukrainians, Tatars and Germans. Kokshetau City Administration (area of 425 km^{2} [164 sq mi]), with a population of roughly 165,153 residents, includes one settlement administration (which consists of the work settlement of Stantsyonny) and the Krasnoyarsk rural district, which includes two rural settlements (the villages of Krasny Yar and Kyzyl-Zhuldyz).

The city is considered to have been founded in 1824 as a military fortress, while it was granted city status in 1895. It was the centre of Kokshetau Region, which was abolished in 1997. It is well known for its nature and tourist sites, such as Burabay and Zerendi, among others. The city's main football team is FC Okzhetpes. Kokshetau is about 185 km (115 mi) from Petropavl, 300 km (190 mi) northwest of the national capital Astana along the A1, 318 km (198 mi) from Omsk along the A13, and 384 km (239 mi) from Kostanay. The city is served by Kokshetau Airport (KOV). The akim (mayor) is Anuar Kumpekeev from the Amanat Party.

Kokshetau is an important economic, educational, and cultural centre of the Akmola Region. Attractions in and around Kokshetau include Akmola Regional Museum of History and Local Lore, Bukpa Hill, Kokshetau City Park, Kokshetau City History Museum, Museum of Literature and Art. The northwest entrance to Burabay National Park (Kazakh: «Бурабай» мемлекеттік ұлттық табиғи паркі, romanized: «Burabai» memlekettık ūlttyq tabiği parkı) and Burabay spa town is a little over 43 miles (70 km) from Kokshetau. Kokshetau was awarded the title Kazakhstan City of Culture for the year 2021.

== Names and etymology ==
- English: Kokshetau, a transliteration of the Russian form
- Kazakh: Көкшетау, romanized: Kökşetau [kɵkʂʲetɑw]
- Russian: Кокшета́у, romanized: Kokshetau Russian pronunciation: [kəkʂɛtaʊ]

The name Kokshetau (Kazakh: Kökşetau; pronounced [køkɕetɑw]) is of Kazakh origin literally meaning a (lit. 'smoky-blue mountain'), kokshe / "көкше", meaning (lit. 'blueish') and tau / "тау", meaning (lit. 'mountain') — the name of always turning blue, as if in a deep haze of mountains, thus "Blueish Mountain/Smoky-Blue Mountain" in English. That is how from ancient times Kazakhs were calling the highest mountain in Akmola Region "Mount Kokshe" (947 m), located 60 miles away from the city.

Following the collapse of the Soviet Union, Kazakhstan declared its independence on 16 December 1991 (Kazakhstan Independence Day), and on 7 October 1993, by the Resolution of the Presidium of the Supreme Council of the Republic of Kazakhstan, the city of Kokchetav (Russian: Кокчета́в, IPA: [koktɕɪˈtav]) was renamed to the more Kazakh sounding Kokshetau as part of the government's campaign to apply Kazakh names to cities, but the city's airport still retains KOV as its IATA code. In Russian it became known as Kokshetau.

=== Chronology of name changes ===
Historically, several names in various languages have identified Kokshetau.

- Stanitsa Kokchetavskaya (1827–1868; which is a romanized back-transliteration from Russian name in Cyrillic: стани́ца Кокчетавская; Kazakh: Көкшетау бекінісі, lit. 'The village of Kokshetau')
- Kokchetav (1868–1993; in publications dating from the Soviet period, the city name was occasionally spelled in English as "Kokchetav", which is a back-transliteration from post-revolution Russian name in Cyrillic: Кокчета́в, Russian name in Cyrillic script (1868-1918): Кокчѣтавъ; Kazakh name in Yañalif script (1929-1940): Kɵkşetau, Kazakh name in Cyrillic script (after 1940): Көкшетау)
- Kokshetau (since 1993; which is a romanized back-transliteration from Russian name in Cyrillic: Кокшета́у; Kazakh name in Cyrillic script: Көкшетау, Kazakh name in Latin script (new version before 2021): Kókshetaý, Kazakh name in Latin script (latest version of the Kazakh Latin alphabet after 2021): Kökşetau)

== Physical geography and geology ==
=== Location ===
Kokshetau is located in the country of Kazakhstan and lies in the northern portion of Akmola Region. The city is located on the border of the West Siberian Plain, on the southeastern shore of Lake Kopa, at an altitude of 234 meters above sea level, in the Kokshetau Mountains, north part of the Kokshetau Hills, the foothills of which surround the city from the south and west. It covers an area of 234 km^{2} (90 sq mi). It is located about 300 kilometres (190 mi) north-west of the national capital of Astana.

The city lay along low hills and by a kidney-shaped lake. There are numerous hills in the vicinity of the city (Bukpa Hill). The city is located in the flat part of the interfluve of the Kylshakty river, flowing in the eastern part of the city, and the Shagalaly river, flowing from the western side of the city. The city has several parks and gardens. Also, within the city limits can be found small forests, mostly consisting of birches and pine plantations. The Kokshetau area is known for its two national parks, Burabay and Kokshetau.

Nearby places

The village of Krasny Yar lies adjoined directly to the west of Kokshetau, on the bank of the River Shagalaly. Also contiguous with Kokshetau, directly to the east, with no natural border, is the smaller village of Stantsyonny.

Nearby cities

- Petropavl
- Astana
- Ekibastuz
- Omsk (Russia)
- Kostanay
- Rudny
- Shchuchinsk
- Karaganda
- Kurgan (Russia)
- Tyumen (Russia)

Nearby towns

- Atbasar
- Arkalyk
- Tara (Russia)
- Taiynsha
- Akkol
- Derzhavinsk
- Ereymentau
- Esil
- Ishim (Russia)
- Makinsk
- Stepnyak
- Stepnogorsk

Nearby villages

- Krasny Yar
- Stantsyonny
- Kyzylzhulduz
- Kyzyltan
- Kaindy
- Akkol (Zerendi District)
- Kishkenekol
- Astrakhanka
- Balkashino
- Shortandy
- Zerendi
- Zhaksy

=== Time ===
The time offset from the UTC used by Kokshetau is 5 hours after UTC, or UTC+5:00 (Kazakhstan Time). This is also used by all of Kazakhstan. This time apply throughout the year as Kazakhstan does not observe Daylight saving time (DST).

=== Climate ===
According to the Köppen climate classification, Kokshetau lies in a cold semi-arid climate zone (Köppen climate classification: BSk) with extreme continental influences. The city has an extreme continental climate with long, very cold, frigid, snowy, dry winters and warm, dry, sunny summers (featuring occasional brief rain showers). Winter is frosty and long (more than 5 months). In spring, prevails clear and dry weather, with a large number of sunny days. Autumn begins in August or September, and the weather is observed from clear at the beginning of the season, to cloudy in October–November. The average annual temperature in Kokshetau is 3.6 °C (38.5 °F). Summer temperatures occasionally reach 35 °C (95 °F) while −30 to −35 °C (−22 to −31 °F) is not unusual between mid-December and early March.

The warmest month is July with daily mean temperature near 20.5 °C (68.9 °F), and the coldest month is January, with a daily mean of −14 °C (7 °F). Snow and ice are dominant during the winter season. July is the wettest month (averaging 68.5 mm (2.7 in) of precipitation) while March is the driest (averaging 10.5 mm (0.4 in) of precipitation). Yearly precipitation amounts to 313 mm (12.3 in). Typically, the city's Lake Kopa and rivers of Kylshakty and Shagalaly are frozen over between the second week of November and the beginning of April.

- Average January temperature: −14 °C (7 °F)
- Average July temperature: +20.5 °C (68.9 °F)
- Average annual precipitation: 176 mm (7 in) to 512.5 mm (20 in)

Climate data for Kokshetau (1991–2020, extremes 1925–present)
Month	Jan	Feb	Mar	Apr	May	Jun	Jul	Aug	Sep	Oct	Nov	Dec	Year
Record high °C (°F)	4.0 (39.2)	6.6 (43.9)	18.7 (65.7)	30.3 (86.5)	35.5 (95.9)	40.1 (104.2)	39.2 (102.6)	37.7 (99.9)	35.0 (95.0)	25.0 (77.0)	16.5 (61.7)	6.0 (42.8)	40.1 (104.2)
Mean daily maximum °C (°F)	−10.3 (13.5)	−8.8 (16.2)	−1.2 (29.8)	10.5 (50.9)	19.6 (67.3)	24.3 (75.7)	25.2 (77.4)	23.6 (74.5)	17.3 (63.1)	9.1 (48.4)	−2.2 (28.0)	−8.1 (17.4)	8.3 (46.9)
Daily mean °C (°F)	−14.3 (6.3)	−13.2 (8.2)	−5.7 (21.7)	5.1 (41.2)	13.5 (56.3)	18.6 (65.5)	19.6 (67.3)	17.8 (64.0)	11.8 (53.2)	4.7 (40.5)	−5.6 (21.9)	−11.7 (10.9)	3.4 (38.1)
Mean daily minimum °C (°F)	−18.8 (−1.8)	−18.0 (−0.4)	−10.5 (13.1)	−0.2 (31.6)	6.9 (44.4)	12.1 (53.8)	13.8 (56.8)	12.0 (53.6)	6.4 (43.5)	0.6 (33.1)	−9.2 (15.4)	−15.7 (3.7)	−1.7 (28.9)
Record low °C (°F)	−42.2 (−44.0)	−42.0 (−43.6)	−37.8 (−36.0)	−26.1 (−15.0)	−8.9 (16.0)	−5.7 (21.7)	2.0 (35.6)	−2.2 (28.0)	−10.5 (13.1)	−26.0 (−14.8)	−42.6 (−44.7)	−44.0 (−47.2)	−44.0 (−47.2)
Average precipitation mm (inches)	12.1 (0.48)	11.3 (0.44)	13.0 (0.51)	19.2 (0.76)	26.3 (1.04)	43.2 (1.70)	72.4 (2.85)	44.0 (1.73)	23.0 (0.91)	22.1 (0.87)	18.2 (0.72)	14.8 (0.58)	319.6 (12.58)
Average precipitation days (≥ 1.0 mm)	3.2	3.0	3.1	4.4	5.6	7.0	9.2	7.0	4.3	5.2	4.4	4.0	60.4
Mean monthly sunshine hours	89	127	196	227	277	306	313	250	190	118	88	75	2,256
Mean daily sunshine hours	2.9	4.3	6.3	7.6	8.9	10.2	10.1	8.1	6.3	3.8	2.9	2.4	6.2
Source 1: Pogoda.ru.net
Source 2: NOAA (sun, 1961–1990), Deutscher Wetterdienst (daily sun 1961-1990)

== Legal status and administrative-territorial division ==
Kokshetau is the capital (administrative centre) of the Akmola Region (oblys, county, area). Kokshetau city administration (Kazakh: Kökşetau qalasy äkımdıgı, Russian: Городская администрация Кокшетау) (area of 425 km^{2} [164 sq mi]), with a population of roughly 193,492 residents, includes one settlement administration and the Krasnoyarsk rural district, which includes two rural settlements, served by the city public transport system.

Kokshetau was the centre of a region covering seventy-eight thousand square kilometres of the Virgin Lands; it administered 15 agricultural districts and connected 4 other towns, 116 state farms, and 25 collective farms, and that region encompassed a population of more than 600,000.

Administrative divisions of the Kokshetau City Administration
No.	Populated place	Population	KATO ID
1	selo of Krasny Yar	▲9875	111033100
2	p.g.t of Stantsyonny	▲2623	111037100
3	selo of Kyzylzhulduz	▼65	111033300

=== Administrative districts and microdistricts ===
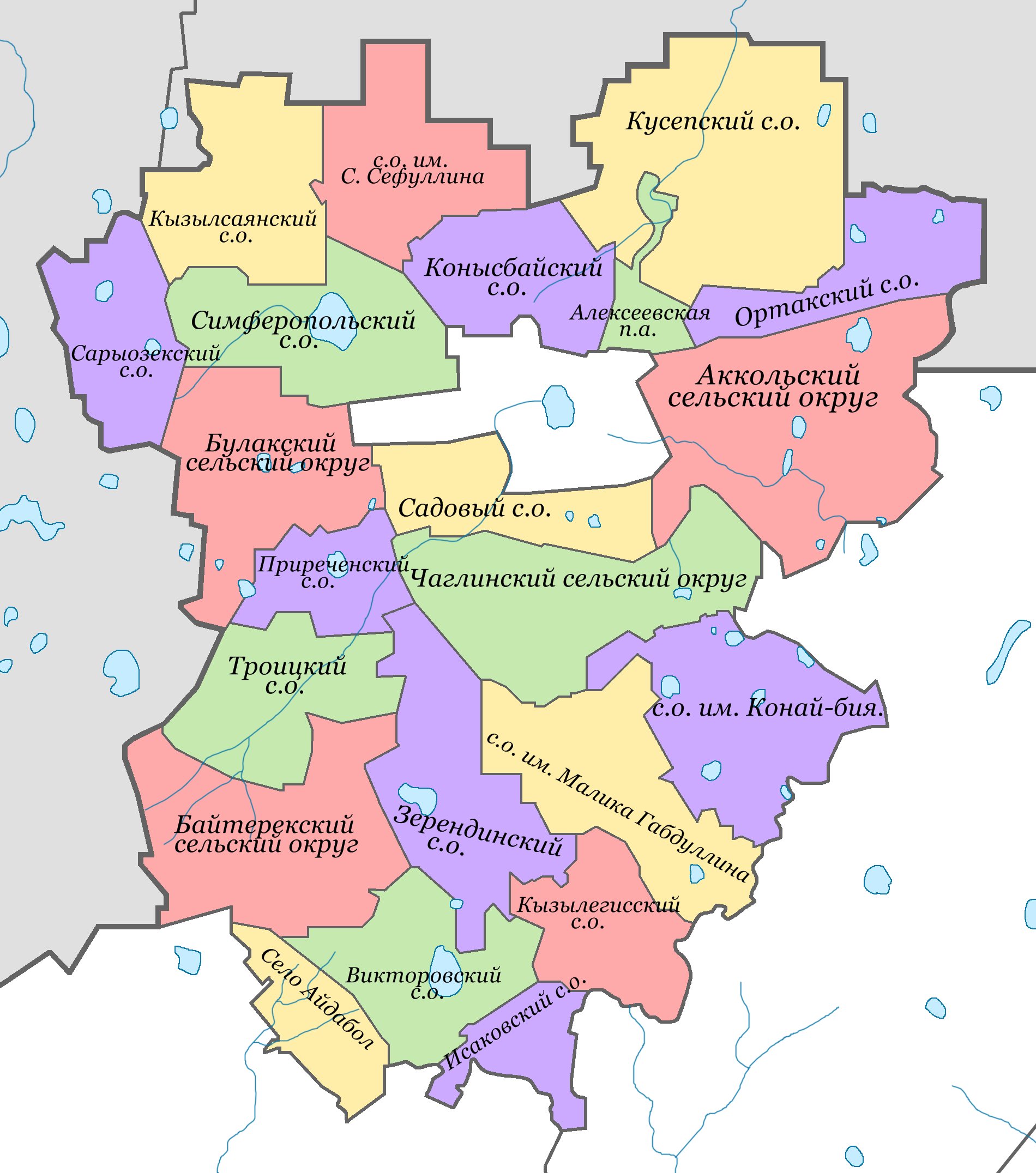
A map of Zerendi District of Akmola Region. The white area in the middle indicates Kokshetau City Administration territorial unit.

Kokshetau is divided into seven administrative districts (Kazakh: аудандар).

Listed alphabetically

- Aul
- Beybitshilik
- Bostandyk
- Bukpa
- Kokshe
- Sary-Arka
- Zhaylau

=== Districts ===
Traditionally, Kokshetau was divided into seventeen administrative microdistricts (Kazakh: шағын аудандар) that today have no administrative function. These are administrative units that possess no independent governance structures. They are used for management of utilities and publicly owned housing.

Kokshetau includes the following microdistricts:

Borovskoy
English name	Kazakh name	Russian name
City Centre	Қала орталығы	Центр города
Barmashino	Бармашино	Бармашино
Abylai Khan Avenue	Абылай хан даңғылы	Проспект Абылай-хана
Regional hospital	Облыстық аурухана	Областная больница
Birlik	Бірлік	Бирлик
Saryarka	Сарыарқа	Сарыарка
Sunkar	Сұнқар	Сункар
Koktem	Көктем	Коктем
Vasilkov	Васильков	Васильковский
Town of builders	Құрылысшылар қаласы	Городок строителей
Railway Station	Вокзал	Вокзал
Jubilee	Юбилейный	Юбилейный
Borovskoy	Боровской	Боровской
Khassenov Market	Хасен базары	Хасеновский рынок
Central	Орталық	Центральный
Zhaylau	Жайлау	Жайлау
Shanghai	Шанхай	Шанхай

== Authorities, local government and politics ==
=== Kokshetau authorities ===
The city administration and Kokshetau City Mäslihat is in the Kokshetau Akimat building on Mukhtar Auezov Street. Kokshetau City Mäslihat is a representative body of the city, elected every four years and holds its sessions in Kokshetau Akimat. The Mayor of Kokshetau is Amanat Party member Bauyrzhan Gaisa.

Local government

The bodies of local self-government of Kokshetau are:

- Kokshetau City Mäslihat, a representative body. Consisting of 17 deputies for four years.
- Mayor of Kokshetau, head of the Kokshetau City Administration manages the administration on the principles of unity of command.

=== Regional authorities ===
Most key buildings of the regional government are along Abai Street and Mukhtar Auezov Street. Abai Street is named after a Kazakh poet, composer and Hanafi Maturidi theologian philosopher Abai Qunanbaiuly. On the eastern side of Abai Street on Abylai Khan Square sits the Akmola Regional Akimat, in a modern cream and brown-toned building.

Local government

The bodies of local self-government of Akmola region are:

- Akmola Regional Mäslihat (parliament of Akmola Region), a representative body. Consisting of 32 deputies for five years.

==== List of akims (mayors) of Kokshetau (1992–present) ====
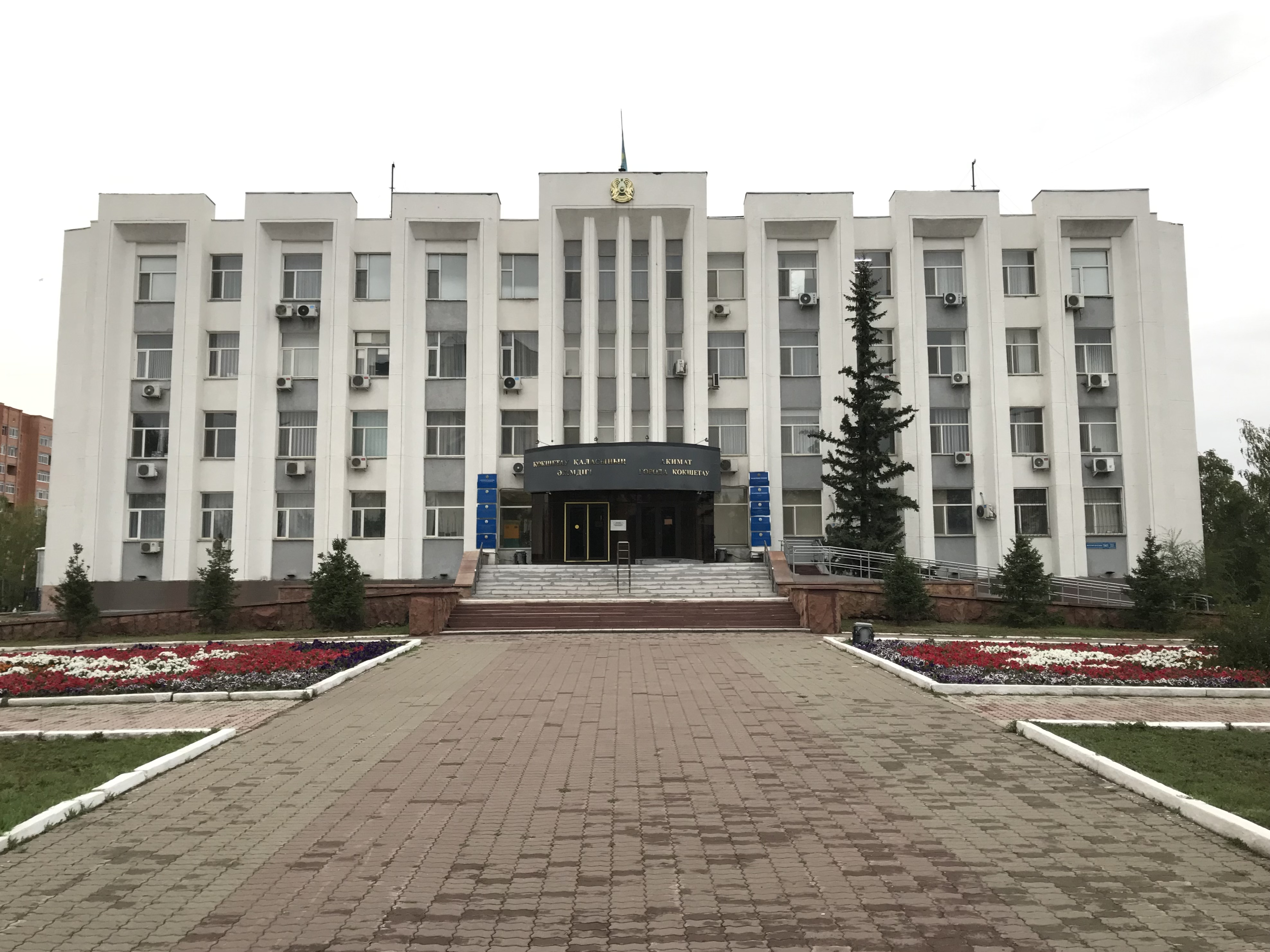
The seat of Kokshetau City Administration and Kokshetau City Mäslihat on Mukhtar Auezov Street

The Akim (Kazakh: әкім, äkım) of Kokshetau is the chief authority in the city of Kokshetau. The position was established in 1992. The mayor is responsible for the administration of government services, the composition of councils and committees overseeing Kokshetau City Administration departments and serves as the chairperson for the meeting of the Kokshetau City Mäslihat. The mayor also functions to help devise long-term development plans in consultation with other stakeholders and bodies to improve the condition, livability, and sustainability of the city.

	Name	Took office	Left office
1	Aidar Murzin	1992	1996
2	Kairbek Kusainov	1996	1997
3	Kamaltin Mukhamedzhanov	1997	1998
4	Valery Nabitovsky	1998	1999
5	Askar Khassen	1999	2001
6	Erkesh Bayakhmetov	2001	2003
7	Dauren Adilbekov	2004	2004
8	Rashit Akimov	2004	2007
9	Andrey Nikishov	2007	2008
10	Bakhyt Saparov	2008	2010
11	Munarbek Batyrkhanov	2010	2013
12	Zharkyn Zhumagulov	2013	2014
13	Zhomart Nurgaliev	2014	2014
14	Ermek Marzhikpaev	2015	2019
15	Amangeldy Smailov	2019	2021
16	Bauyrzhan Gaisa	2021	2024
17	Anuar Kumpekeev	2024	Present

==== Politics ====
The city council (Kokshetau City Mäslihat) of Kokshetau is made up of 17 representatives that are elected every four years. The Kokshetau City Mäslihat governs the city alongside the Akim (Mayor). The 2023 local government elections for Kokshetau City Mäslihat in Kokshetau yielded the following results:

Parties	Number of Representatives
Amanat	10
Aq Jol Democratic Party (Aq Jol)	2
People's Party of Kazakhstan (QHP)	1
Respublica	1
Independent	*3
Total number of members	17

== History ==
Historical affiliations

Kokshetau Mountains 1465–1756
∟ part of the Kazakh Khanate
Kokshetau Mountains 1756
∟ part of the Qing dynasty
Kokshetau Mountains 1756–1827
∟ part of the Kazakh Khanate
Omsk Oblast 1827–1838
∟ part of the Russian Empire
Border control of the Siberian Kirghiz 1838–1854
∟ part of the Russian Empire
Siberian Kirghiz Oblast 1854–1868
∟ part of the Russian Empire
Akmolinsk Oblast 1868–1917
∟ part of the Russian Empire

1917-1922 Revolution

Alash Autonomy 1917–1918
The Ufa Directory 1918–1918
Russian Government 1918–1919
Kirghiz Territory 1919–1920
∟ part of the Russian SFSR
Kirghiz ASSR 1920–1922
∟ autonomous part of the Russian SFSR

Kirghiz ASSR 1922–1925
∟ part of the Russian SFSR in the USSR
Kazakh ASSR 1925–1936
∟ part of the Russian SFSR in the USSR
Soviet Kazakhstan 1936–1991
∟ constituent republic of the Soviet Union
Kazakhstan 1991–present

=== Early history ===
Kokshetau past incorporates all the main stages and turning points of the history of Kazakhstan. For many centuries, nomadic Kazakh tribes lived on the territory of the former Kokshetau Region. The territory of Kokshetau was part of the Middle Horde, the clans of the tribal union of the Argyns that occupied vast regions of Northern and Central Kazakhstan. In the 18th – 19th centuries, the headquarters of famous khans, such as Abylai Khan, Kasym Khan, Kenesary Khan, were located on the land of Kokshetau Region.

The Battle of Kokshetau Mountains, part of the First Sino–Kazakh War, was fought between the Kazakh Khanate and Dzungar remnants against the Qing dynasty military, which ended with the Chinese victory and temporary occupation, before harsh winter ultimately decimated the Chinese force and eventual withdrawal.

=== Foundation of Kokshetau (1824–1917) ===
As Russia's hand stretched southwards, Kokshetau was initially founded on 29 April 1824 as an administrative outpost at the foot of the southern side of Mount Kokshe on the shores of Lake Ulken Shabakty. The Middle Horde signed treaties of protection with Russia. The local population strongly opposed the fact that the new settlement was placed in the chosen place. In the summer of 1827, the district order was transferred to the new place where the city of Kokshetau is now located. The settlement began to be called Kokchetav. The construction of the settlement began at the foot of Bukpa Hill, on the southern shores of Lake Kopa, and a picket was set up to protect the district order.

By the middle of 19th-century, the population of the settlement was significantly increasing due to the migration of the peasants from Russia (Povolzhye) and Ukraine who were driven to migrate by starvation and poverty to farm the steppe. In 1868, when the Akmolinsk Oblast was formed, Kokshetau became a district city in this region, which further developed as a center of agricultural and animal husbandry and as a resort town. In 1876, the city lost its military significance. The line and fortress were abolished. In 1895, Kokshetau was granted city status. By that time the population in the town was above 5 thousand people.

=== Soviet era (1918–1991) ===
In 1928, Kokshetau District was divided into several boroughs and until 1944 Kokshetau's territory was part of Karaganda Region and later part of North Kazakhstan Region. On 16 March 1944, according to the Decree of the Presidium of Supreme Soviet of Kazakh SSR, Kokshetau became the administrative center of the newly created Kokchetav Oblast. Relatively rapid growth and development of Kokshetau took place during the years of development of virgin lands, especially in the second half of the 1950s.

=== Fall of the Soviet Union and modern history (1991–present) ===
On 3 May 1997, Kokshetau Oblast was abolished, the city was deprived of the status of a regional center. On 8 April 1999, after Akmola and North Kazakhstan regions were reorganized, Kokshetau became the center of Akmola Region.

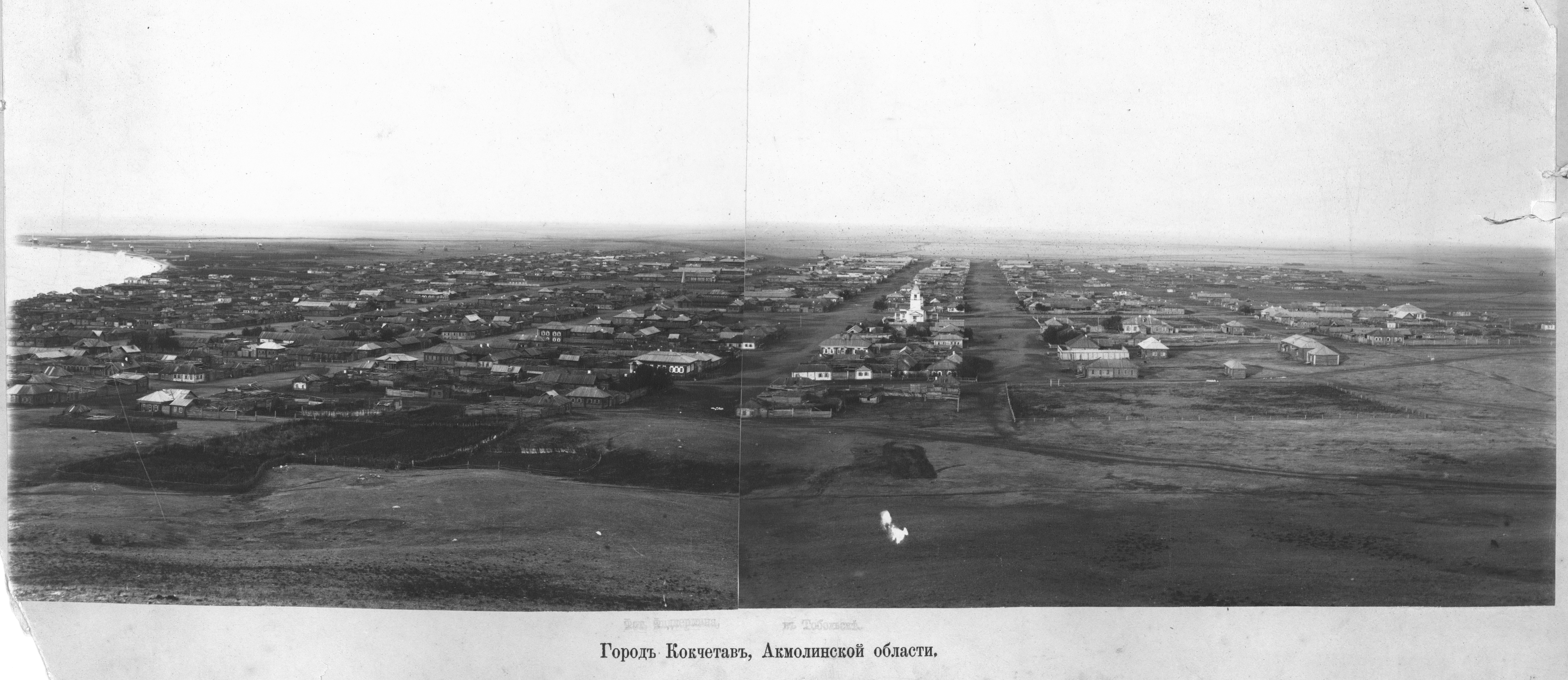
A 19th-century panorama view looking into the city of Kokshetau before rebuilding as seen from the Bukpa Hill Lookout. The Lake Kopa is visible to the left, and the St George's Church to the right.

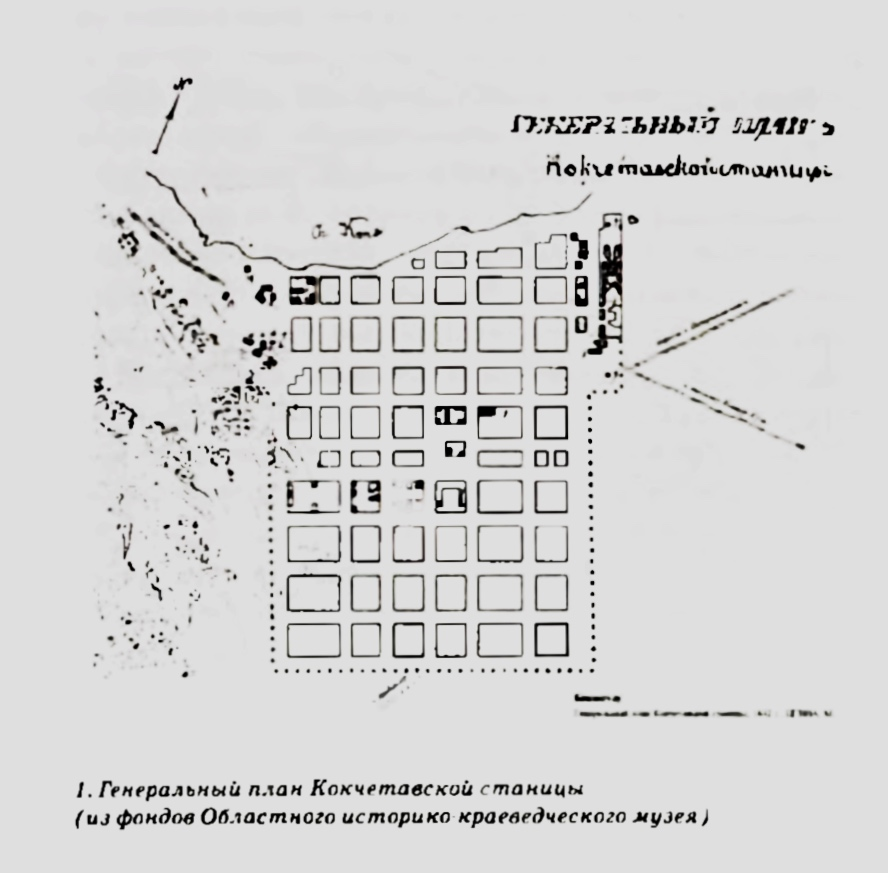
General plan of Kokchetav stanitsa, 19th century

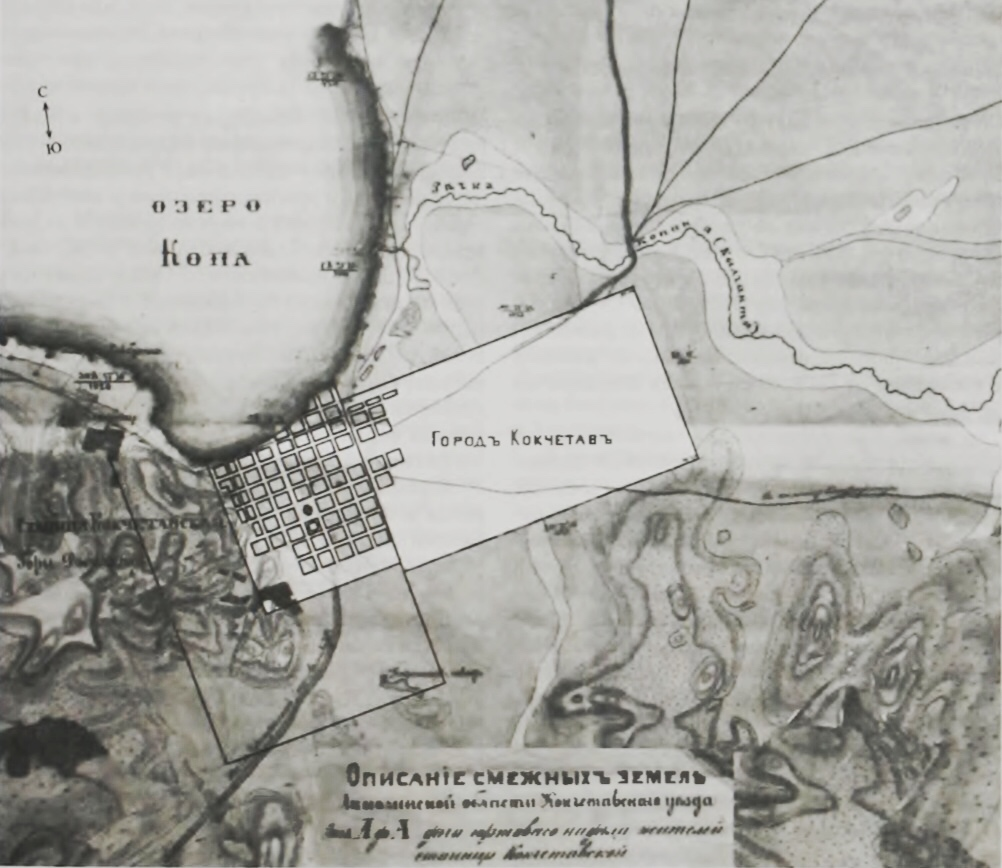
Map of Kokchetav uezd in the late 19th century

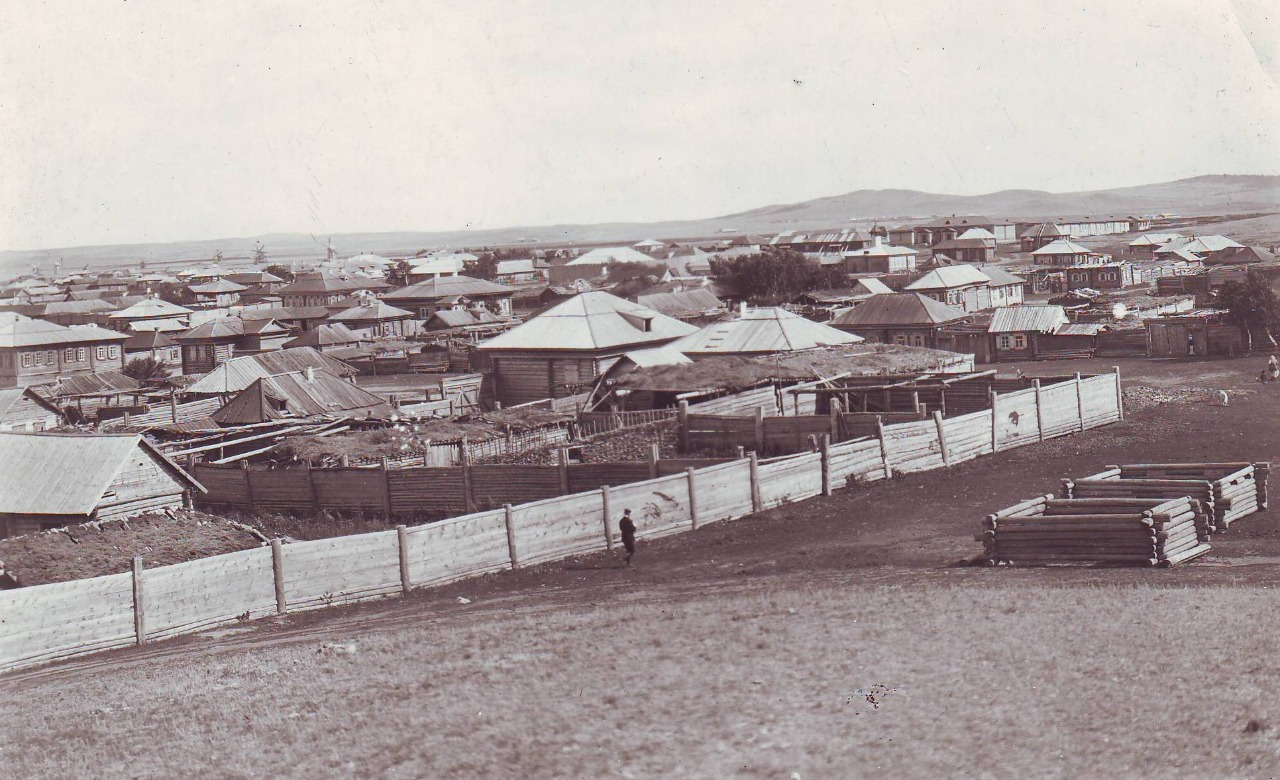
A 19th-century view of the city

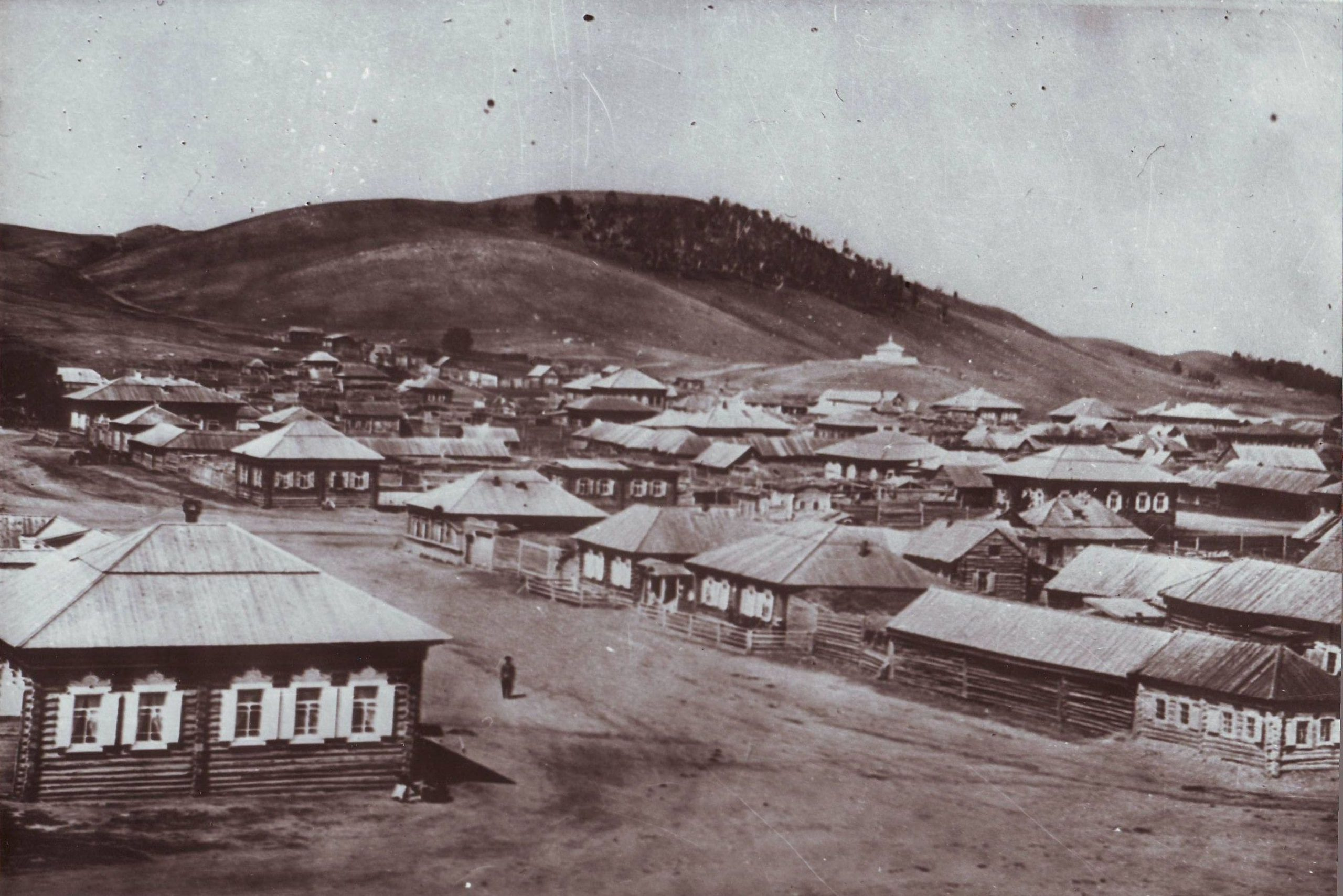
An 1880 image of Bukpa Hill in the background

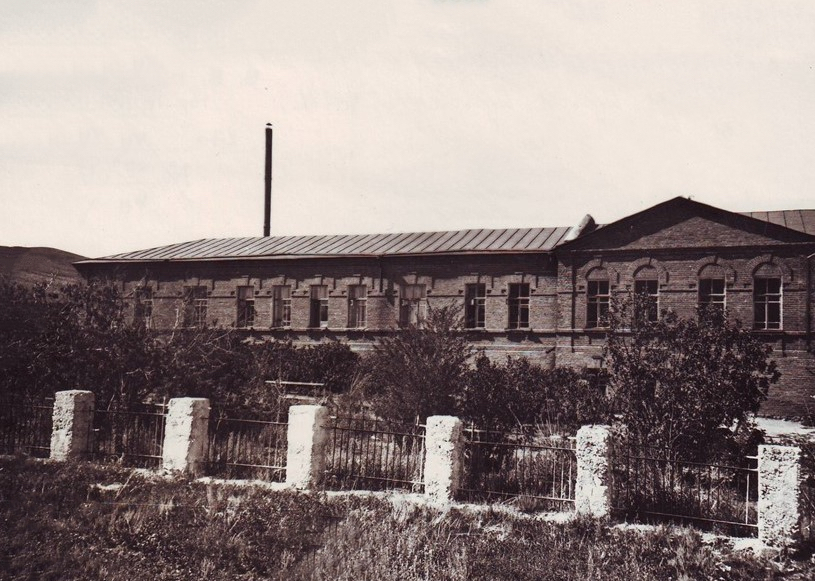
1916: Military hospital in Kokchetav

== Demographics ==
=== Population ===
Kokshetau is the seventeenth-largest city in Kazakhstan. Kokshetau ranks fourth in terms of population in Northern Kazakhstan, ranking after Pavlodar, Kostanay and Petropavl. Residents of Kokshetau are referred to as "көкшетаулықтар" (kökşetaulyqtar) in Kazakh and "кокшета́уцы" (kokshetautsy) in Russian.

Vital statistics for 2023:

- Births: 3,173 (male – 54.87%, female – 45.13%)
- Deaths: 1,545 (male – 52.10%, female – 47.90%)

Infant mortality rate (2023):

- 15 infant deaths (aged under one year)

Marriage and divorce statistics (2023):

- There were 1,359 marriages in total
- There were 360 divorces granted

Demographic evolution (city)
1885	1887	1894	1897	1910	1911	1920	1923	1926	1931	1936	1939	1945
5,705	1,819	4,411	4,962	4,273	6,700	7,796	10,383	11,060	12,500	16,300	19,260	23,400
1959	1970	1974	1979	1989	1990	1991	1992	1993	1999	2000	2001	2002
52,909	80,564	91,000	103,162	136,757	139,000	143,300	145,200	144,000	123,389	122,445	122,173	121,052
2003	2004	2005	2006	2007	2008	2009	2010	2011	2012	2013	2014	2015
121,661	123,640	125,455	127,317	129,244	131,215	135,106	136,156	137,268	136,835	139,063	140,847	142,411
2016	2017	2018	2019	2020	2021	2022	2023	2024	2025	style="background:#f7f9ff;"	145,795	145,531	145,789	145,161	146,104	148,550	150,649	176,322	176,849	179,907	183,170

Note: 2024 and 2020 are population estimates; 1897 is the Russian Imperial Census; 1959, 1970, 1979 and 1989 are the Soviet Census.

=== Languages ===
Kazakh and Russian are both the main spoken languages. Throughout its history Kokshetau has been a city of many languages. The state and official language in Kokshetau, as in all Kazakhstan, is the Kazakh language. Kazakh is one of the Turkic languages and the mother tongue of Kazakhs living in Kokshetau.

It is also common to find the Kazakh being spoken in the city, mainly by Kazakhs and other Turkic people, while many elderly people speak Kazakh or Russian, depending on their upbringing. Russians, Ukrainians, some Tatars, Germans, Poles, Ingush, Belarusians, Koreans, Azerbaijanis, Armenians, Bashkirs, Moldovans, Mari in Kokshetau speak Russian.

=== Ethnic and national composition ===
Kokshetau is an ethnically and culturally diverse city. It has changed its demographics, nowadays having more ethnic Kazakhs in a city that formerly had a Slavic majority. It is the only regional center in Northern Kazakhstan where Kazakhs make up the majority.

As of January 2024, the population of Kokshetau is 176,849, and the extended urbanized area has 193,492 inhabitants.

Historically, Kokshetau was ethnically diverse. As of the 2020 Census, ethnic Kazakhs made up (~58%) of the city population, representing an increase from 36% in 1999.

Ethnic composition of Kokshetau

Ethnicity	Year									
Ethnicity	1897		1939		2004		2014		2024	
Ethnicity	Population	%	Population	%	Population^{1}	%	Population^{1}	%	Population^{1}	%
Kazakhs	800	16.2	3,789	19.6	60,882	45.0	85,236	55.4	120,719	62.4
Russians	3,111	62.7	11,920	61.9	51,188	37.8	48,734	31.6	45,130	23.3
Ukrainians	379	7.6	1,501	7.8	7,558	5.6	4,986	3.2	7,490	3.9
Germans	2	0.04	98	0.5	2,686	2.0	2,943	1.9	4,782	2.5
Tatars	481	9.7	1,275	6.6	4,158	3.1	3,727	2.4	4,203	2.2
Poles	3	0.06	179	0.9	2,326	1.7	2,230	1.4	3,004	1.6
Others	186	3.7	498	2.6	6,502	4.8	6,117	4.0	8,164	4.2
Total	4,962	100	19,260	100	135,300	100	154,000	100	193,492	100
^{1}The population estimates for 2004, 2014, and 2024 include settlements under the jurisdiction of the Kokshetau City Administration, such as urban-type settlement of Stantsyonny and village of Krasny Yar.

=== Religion ===
Religion in Kokshetau (c.a.) (2009 census), Percentage
Sunni Islam	56.65%
Christians	40.85%
Atheism and irreligion	2.12%
Undeclared	0.33%
Judaism	0.02%
Buddhism	0.02%
Other religions	0.01%

Kokshetau is one of the most religiously diverse cities of Kazakhstan with more than 56.65 per cent of its population adhering to Islam. Religious buildings are scattered around the city.

==== Sunni Islam ====
Islam (primarily Sunni Islam) is the predominant religion within Kokshetau, with 56.65% of residents identifying as Muslims in the 2009 Census. There were 83,436 Muslims reported in the 2009 census. Kokshetau's first Mosque was established by Ablay (Abilkhair) Gabbas in 1846. Kokshetau has a mosque constructed in the beginning of the 20th century. A new mosque for 1,200 people named after Nauan Hazrat opened in 2015.

Mosques:

- Nauan Hazrat Mosque (capacity 1,200—1,400), located at the corner of Momishuly and Auelbekov streets. It is the largest mosque in Akmola Region.
- Zhakiya Kazhi Mosque, located on the Aulbekova Street.

==== Russian Orthodox Church ====
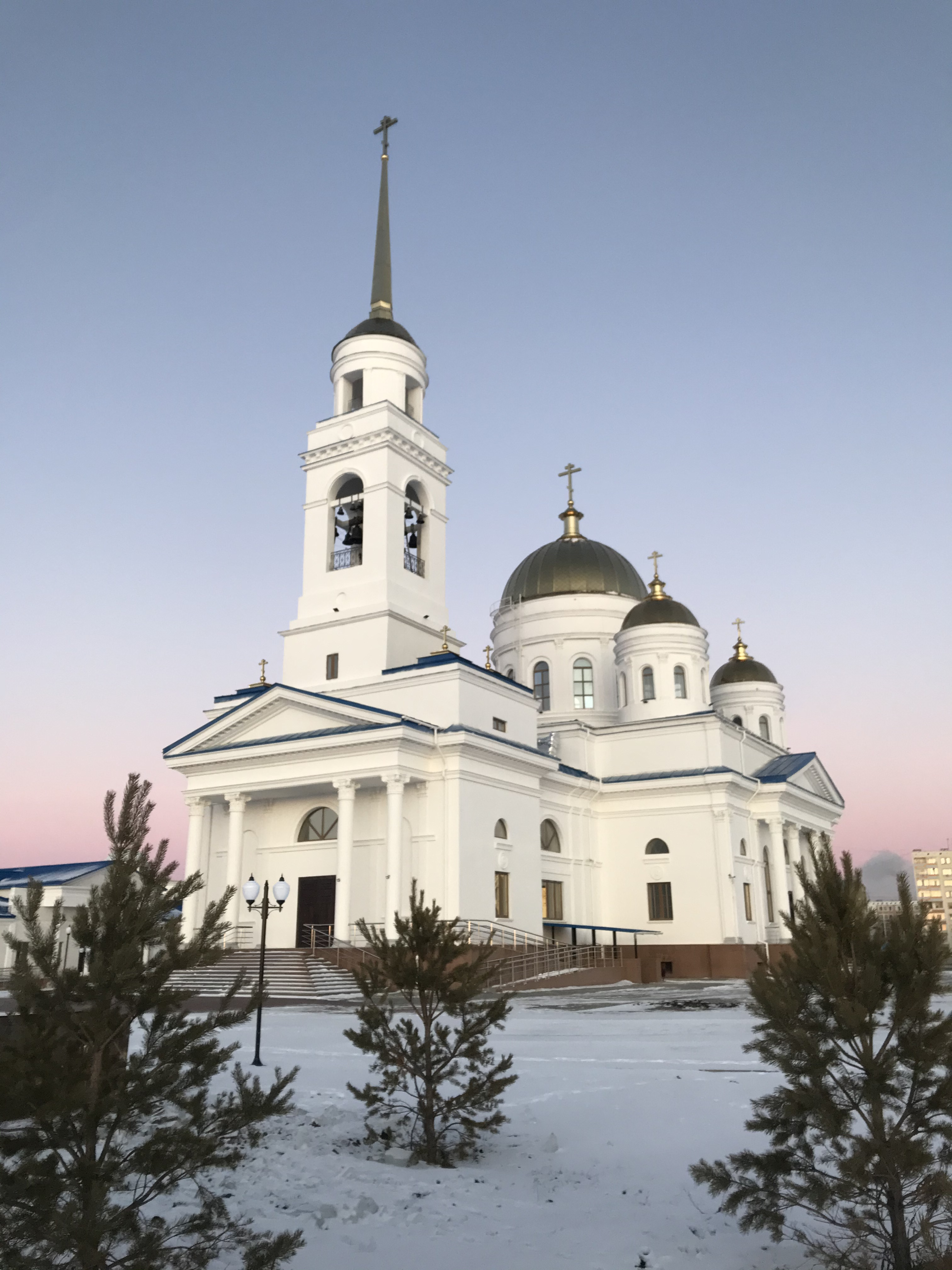
Church of the Resurrection

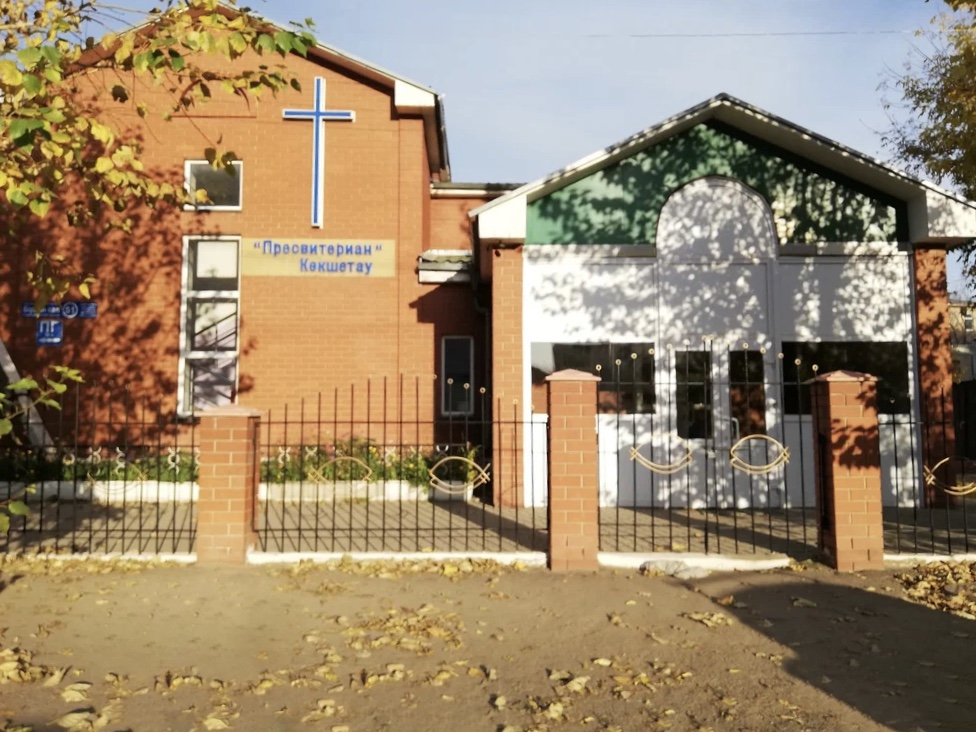
Presbyterian Worship Centre

Kokshetau has a Russian Orthodox Church temple of Archangel Michael. The Kokshetau and Akmola diocese is located in the Church of the Resurrection in the city.

Russian Orthodox churches:

- Church of the Resurrection (capacity 1,500), (ROC). It is located on the new embankment of Lake Kopa. The church was built in the traditions of Russian church architecture of the mid-XIX century.
- Church of the Holy Archangel Michael, Kokshetau, (ROC)
- St George's Church, Kokshetau. Kokshetau's first Christian Church.

==== Other religions ====
Other religions practiced are Christianity (primarily Roman Catholicism, and Protestantism). Christianity is Kokshetau's second largest religion. There were 60,168 Christians reported in the 2009 census. Much of Kokshetau's civic life and civil society is secular in the sense that it has no religious character.

In 1997, a Roman Catholic Church was built in neo-Gothic style using red bricks.

Roman Catholic churches:

- Church of St. Anthony of Padua, Kokshetau

== Entertainment, tourism and culture ==
Kokshetau is the major cultural center of Akmola Region. Culture in Kokshetau, first developed during the period of Russian Empire, grew under the Soviet Union, which established many of the first cultural institutions of the city. Now it has 2 theatres and 5 museums. There is 1 cinema and 12 libraries. The city is full of clubs, restaurants, and bars.

As the capital of Akmola Region, Kokshetau is a melting pot of cultures from all ethnic groups of the region. Though Kazakh people are an indigenous community of Kokshetau, the city's culture represents many languages and ethnic groups, supports differences regarding religion, traditions and linguistics, rather than any single and dominant culture.

=== Theatres ===
Kokshetau has a strong theater culture. Kokshetau is home to many theatre groups, mainly operating under the support of the ministry of culture. Theatre halls in the city organize several shows and performances throughout the year. Kokshetau's major theaters are:

- From the central Abylai Khan Square, pedestrianised Kanysh Satbayev Street runs south a couple of blocks to the Palace of Culture (Kazakh: Mädeniet Saraiy; opened in 1977), which also incorporates Akmola Regional Russian Drama Theater, and it is quite popular among locals.
- Akmola Regional Kazakh Music and Drama Theatre named after Shahhmet Kussainov (opened in 1996) is the biggest theatre in Kokshetau and is popular among Kazakh speaking people.
- Children's puppet theater "Altyn Saka" (opened in 2022)

=== National events/festivals ===
The city organises many public celebrations that greatly attract the locals as well as the visitors.

- "Dombyra Fest"
- "Sabantuy" (annual)
- "Festival of Kazakh culture" (annual). It is the most widely celebrated festival among Kazakhs.
- "Bir shanyrak astynda"
- "Russian (Russkaya) Pesnya"

=== Philharmonic ===
- Akmola Regional Philharmonic named after Ükılı Ybyrai was founded in 1956.

=== Historical museums ===
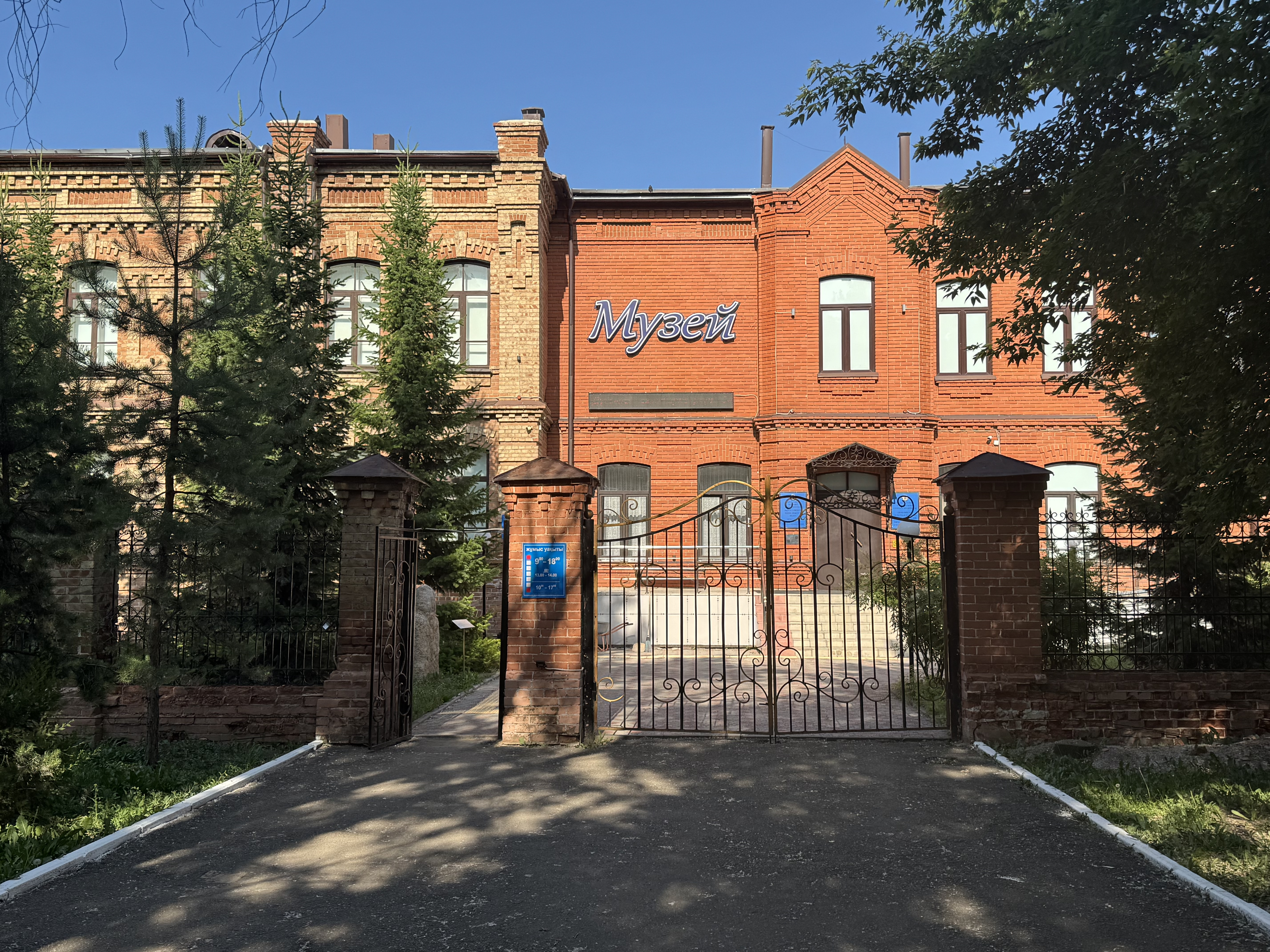
Akmola Regional Museum of History and Local Lore

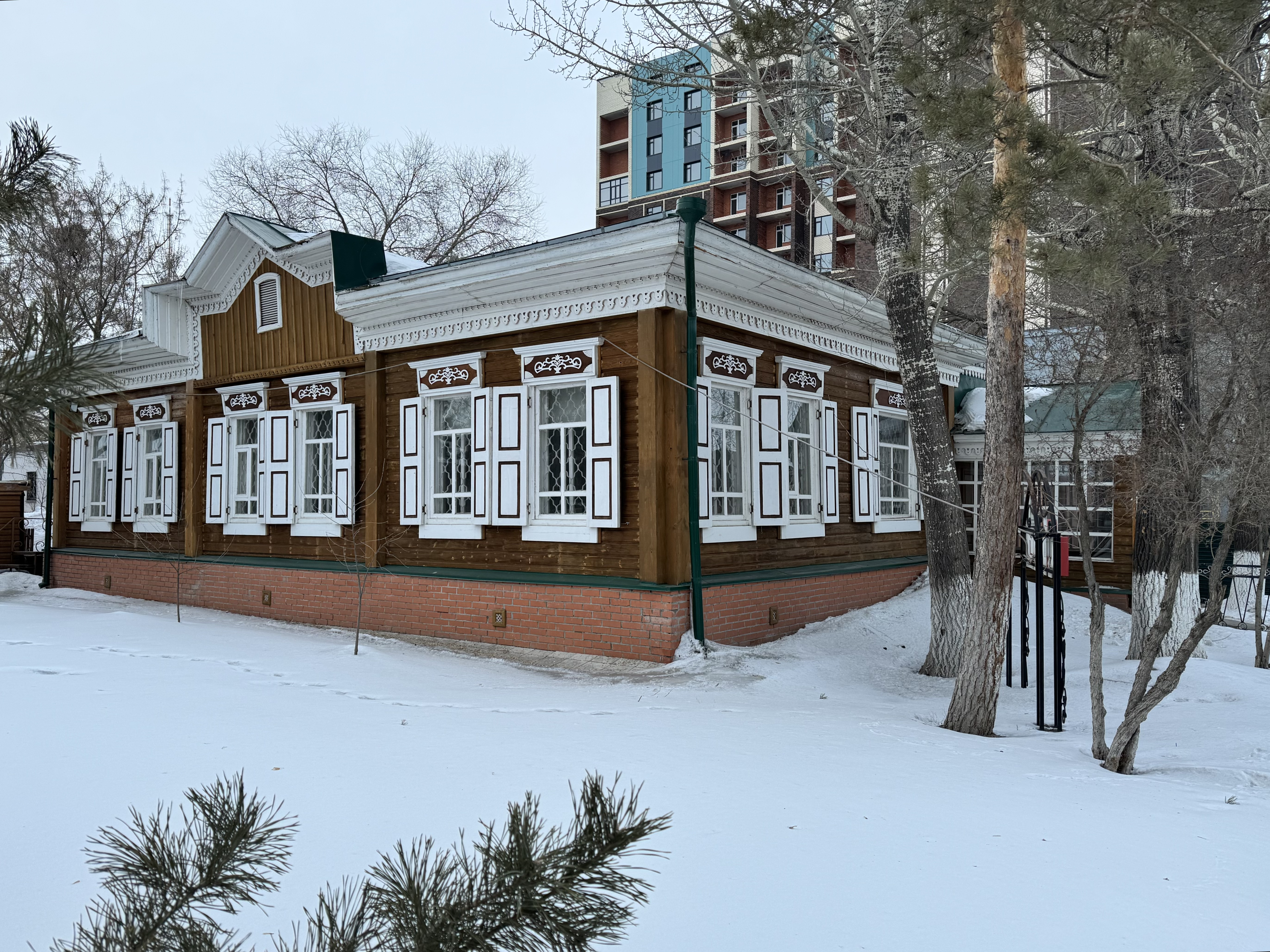
Kokshetau City History Museum

Kokshetau is home to several of Akmola Region's most important museums. Kokshetau has several museums dedicated to Akmola Region's history and culture. Museums in the city include:

- Akmola Regional Museum of History and Local Lore (opened in 1920) offers a display of minerals and semi-precious stones in the foyer, and rooms on the ground floor devoted to palaeontology and to World War II, the latter focused on displays related to local war heroes. It is the largest museum in Kokshetau.
- Kokshetau City History Museum (KCHM; opened as Valerian Kuybyshev’s Memorial Museum in 1949), located at the a street on a hillside. The wooden house of the museum is where Valerian Kuybyshev, one of the Revolution's most famous heroes, had grown up. The house is surrounded by trees, with a stable or coach-house at the back and a particular memorial tree planted by his mother in 1903 in memory of Valerian's brother, accidentally shot and killed by a friend. This little museum initially was dedicated to a really tough revolutionary. As a boy Valerian Kuybyshev had started taking part in the anti-tsarist movement and then in the days of the Bolshevik struggle had led troops against the White Guards in the Civil War, he was one of those revolutionaries in the true spirit of the Revolution. There were also Amankeldı İmanov and Alibi Dzhangildin who are national heroes of the Central Asian uprising in 1916. The city's museum offers a view of Kokshetau's history through old maps and photos.
- Museum of Mercy and Courage (opened in 1982)

Biographical museums:

- Museum of the Hero of the Soviet Union Malik Gabdullin (opened in 1993), located at the corner of Auelbekov and Nazarbayev streets, on the eastern side of the town centre, the modern-looking two-storey wooden building. Malik Gabdullin was born in 1915, in a village 30 km away from Kokshetau. When he was made a Hero of the Soviet Union in 1943, the authorities constructed for his family a larger and nicer wooden house adjacent to this, but his pious father donated the wood from this building to efforts to reconstruct the Kokshetau Mosque, when the latter was damaged by fire in 1956.

Literature museums:

- Museum of Literature and Art (opened in 1989)

=== Cinemas ===
The first film screening in the city of Kokchetav (now Kokshetau) took place in 1910.

- Cinema Alem (formerly known as the Druzhba Cinema; it was built in 1963, and as of 2023 was still being used as a cinema). It is located in Independence Square and is currently the largest cinema in the city.

=== Libraries ===
==== Public libraries ====
The city has 12 libraries. In addition to the libraries affiliated with the various universities and schools, the Akmola Regional Universal Scientific Library is a major research library. There are several archives in Kokshetau.

- Akmola Regional Universal Scientific Library (ARUSL) named after Magzhan Zhumabayev. ARUSL was inaugurated in 1946. It is Akmola Region's main academic library and scientific information centre.

==== University libraries ====
The Kokshetau State University library contains over 735,000 units of educational and scientific literature and a rare fund, which consists of 104 copies of printed works published in the 19th century in Kazakh, Russian, German and English languages, making it one of the largest libraries in all of Akmola Region.

=== Kazakhstan Capital of Culture 2021 ===
Kokshetau was selected as a Kazakhstan Capital of Culture for 2021.

=== Palaces ===
- Kokshetau Palace of Culture
- Palace of Culture «Dostar»
- Palace of Childhood and Youth «Bolashak Sarayi»
- Kokshetau Wedding Palace, a civil registry building. It was built in 2017.

=== Mausoleums ===
- Nauan Hazrat Mausoleum. The construction of the mausoleum began in 2020. It was built around the grave of the famous religious figure Nauryzbay Talasuly. It is located near the old Muslim cemetery. This site was added to the list of objects of historical and cultural heritage of Akmola Region, as well as the list of 100 sacred places of Kazakhstan.

=== Cemeteries ===
There are 5 cemeteries in Kokshetau.

- Old Cossack cemetery. It is located at the area of Barmashino where a monument to a Soviet soldier is situated. The mass grave of Soviet officers and soldiers who died in local hospitals is also located there.
- Old Orthodox cemetery. The cemetery was closed to new burials in the 1969.
- Old Muslim cemetery
- Muslim cemetery (Second Cemetery)
- Christian cemetery (Third Cemetery)

== Monuments and memorials ==
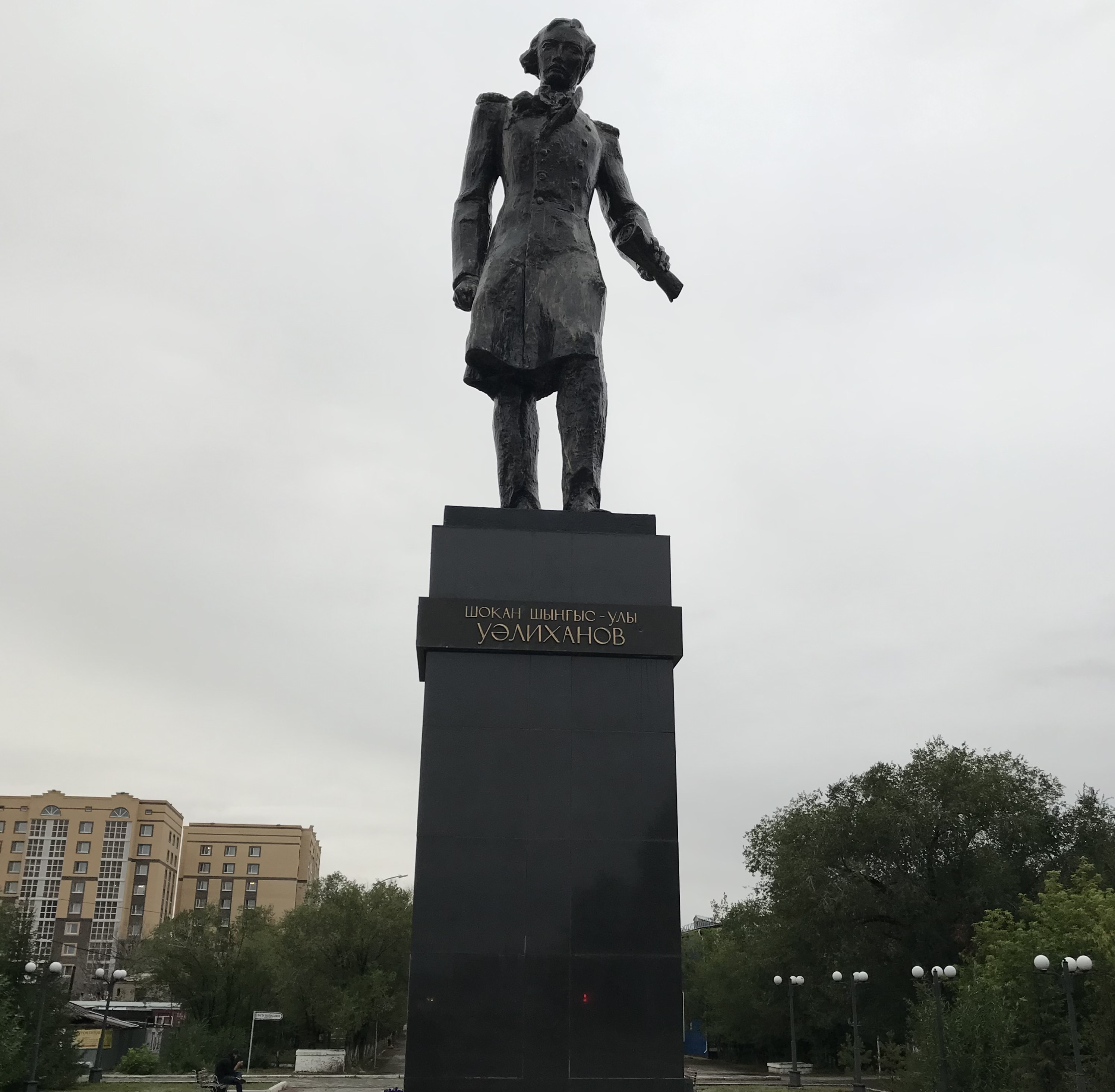
Shoqan Walikhanov Monument

- The statue of Shoqan Walikhanov who had been a traveller, scientist, geographer, and one of the first Kazakh democrat, a tall handsome figure in a granite officer's greatcoat. He had been an officer in the tsar's army and was supposed to be a descendant of Genghis Khan himself, no less. His grandfather Abylai Khan had been called the last Khan of the Kazakh Khanate.
- On the west side of the Abylai Khan Square there is a statue of Abylai Khan, depicted squatting regally, his right hand on his hip in a display of relaxed strength. Behind the Kazakh ruler rises a very tall stalk of wheat, on the tip of which a bird is flying.
- In the central park there is also a statue of Vladimir Lenin, standing next to a simple Soviet monument to the Kazakhstnis killed in the Civil War; it was removed from the central square.
- A bust of Talgat Bigeldinov, a pilot who notched up 305 combat missions, shot down seven enemy aircraft and was twice made Hero of the Soviet Union, is followed by a series of polished stones inscribed with he names of the Hero Cities of the Soviet Union. These run for two blocks, ending up at the War Memorial. A young flag-bearing soldier kneels before an eternal flame. Behind him rises peculiar silvery sculpture of a star with a point missing. The portraits of local war heroes are presented on the surrounding wall, in alphabetical order, starting with Talgat Bigeldinov.
- In the centre of the city, just in front of the Akmola Regional Museum of History and Local Lore, an inscription on a wall-like monument records a decree of the Presidium of the Supreme Soviet of the USSR from 1958, awarding Kokshetau Oblast the Order of Lenin by virtue of its success in surpassing the yearly plan for bread production.
- There is also a statue of a young, rathe studently-looking Valerian Kuybyshev, a Bolshevik military commander during the Civil War and key figure behind the first Five-Year Plan, who gave his name to the city of Samara during the Soviet period.

== Economy and services ==
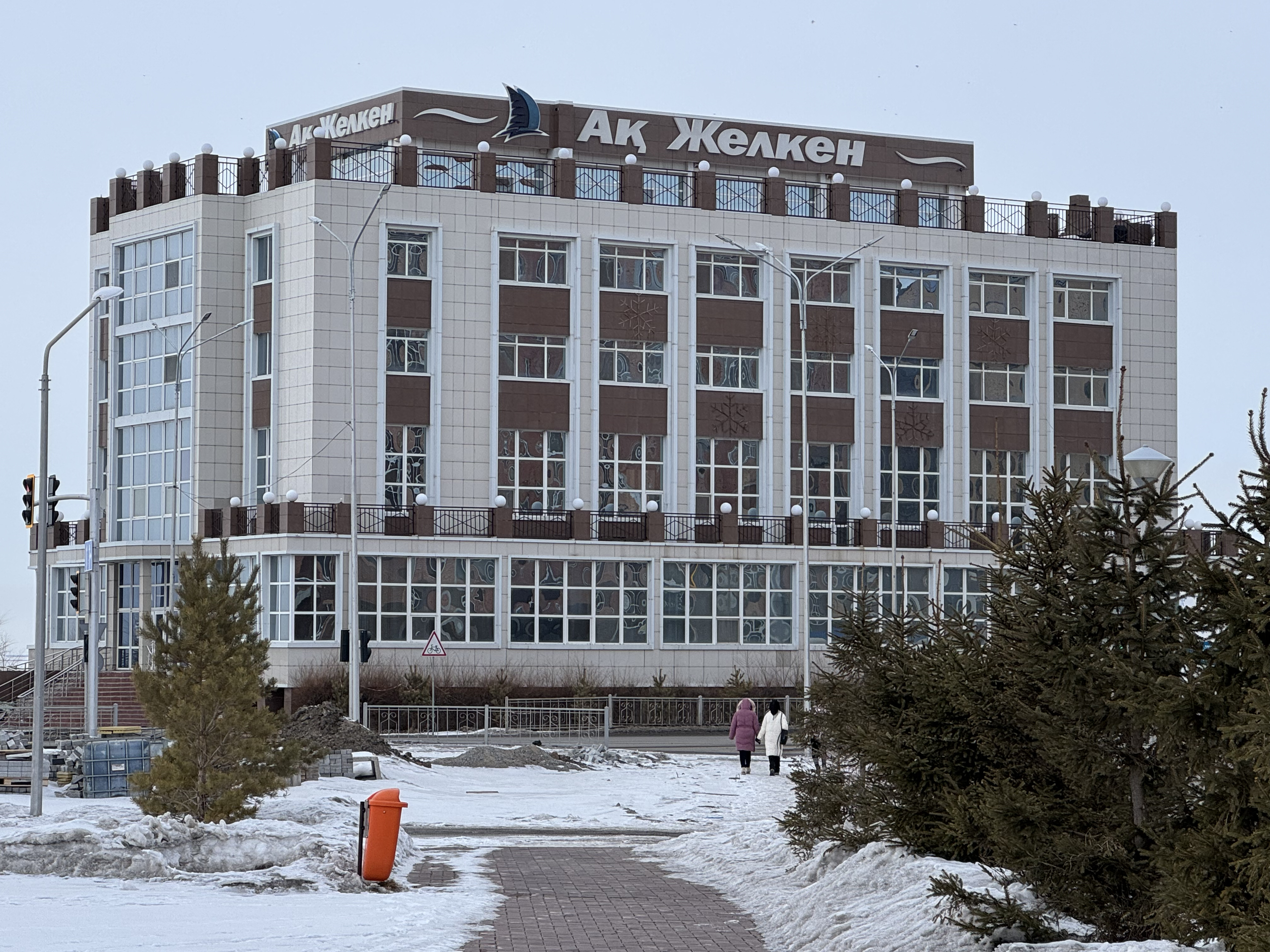
Hotel in Kokshetau

In autumn 1941, the Podolskiy Sewing Machines Plant, two factories from the city of Ordzhonikidze and military hospitals were evacuated to Kokshetau.

Kokshetau has traditionally been an important commercial center in northern Kazakhstan, but after the collapse of the Soviet Union most of the old manufacturing lines, whose markets included the entire Soviet Union, either stopped working or had to greatly reduce their operations. The collapse of the Soviet Union also meant the collapse of Kazakhstan's industrial base.

Nevertheless, the city continues to be an important regional center for the Akmola Region, acting as a commercial hub for the surrounding areas in the region. In recent years, the city has started attracting more investment from various corporations. Kokshetau Oblast had really started developing as the machine factories and other industries grew, and the numerous rest homes, sanatoria, and holiday spots were set up.

From Ekibastuz to Kokshetau runs an overhead power line designed for a transmission voltage of 1,150 kV, the Ekibastuz-Kokshetau powerline. Kokshetau's retail business is growing with several newly built malls and shopping centres.

=== Industry ===
Major industrial employers of Kokshetau include:

- Altyntau Kokshetau – gold mining enterprise. The site comprises a gold deposit and the Gold Recovery Plant commissioned in 2009. The innovative high-tech equipment manufactured in Canada, Australia, USA, Sweden, Finland, Germany, Italy and Russia is installed at the plant. Over the last eight years of operation, the output increased 2.5 times and metal recovery increased by one fifth hitting 75% in 2019.
- Tynys – the production of medical products, weighing equipment, water meters, aircraft units and assemblies, polyethylene pipes.
- KamAZ-Engineering – machine-building plant.
- Kokshetau Mineral Waters – TURAN water is bottled at Kokshetau Mineral Waters plant using KHS equipment. TURAN water is produced from Kuskol water deposit located in an ecologically pristine area near Kokshetau. The deposit is subject to constant government control, and the water well is guarded 24/7.

Food factories supply Kokshetau and Akmola Region with sausages, semi-finished meat products, bread, dairy products, and confectionery. The city also has a new ceramic brick factory.

== Public services ==
Kokshetau is policed by Police Department of the Akmola Region (a territorial police force) whose headquarters are in the city.

Fire services in Kokshetau are provided by Department of Emergency Situations of the Akmola Region.

Domestic waste services in Kokshetau are provided by Kokshe Tazalyk and EcoGroup 2020 Services under contract.

=== Health and medical care ===
Kokshetau has an extensive network of municipal and regional health facilities. Kokshetau is a major healthcare and medical service centre in Akmola Region. During the war five evacuated hospitals were places on the territory of North-Kazakhstan region, including 3 hospitals in Kokshetau. Several hospitals of Kokshetau, refurbished with modern technologies, provide healthcare and conduct medical research.

Local hospitals include the Avicenna Medical Centre, Viamedis Rehabilitation Centre among many others. Temporary hospitals were established and vaccines were available in all major hospitals during the 2020-2021 COVID-19 pandemic. Private medical institutions also operate in the city.

== Telecommunication ==
The official opening of the Kokshetau city telephone network took place on 1878. As of 2005, the total capacity of the telephone network in Kokshetau was about 42,634 numbers. The city has several mobile operators (Kcell/Altel, Tele2 Kazakhstan, Beeline).

In addition to the mobile network providers, Kazakhtelecom provides internet services.

Kazpost is the official national postal operator of Kazakhstan. Based in Kokshetau, it currently operates through 10 postal offices in city.

== Media ==
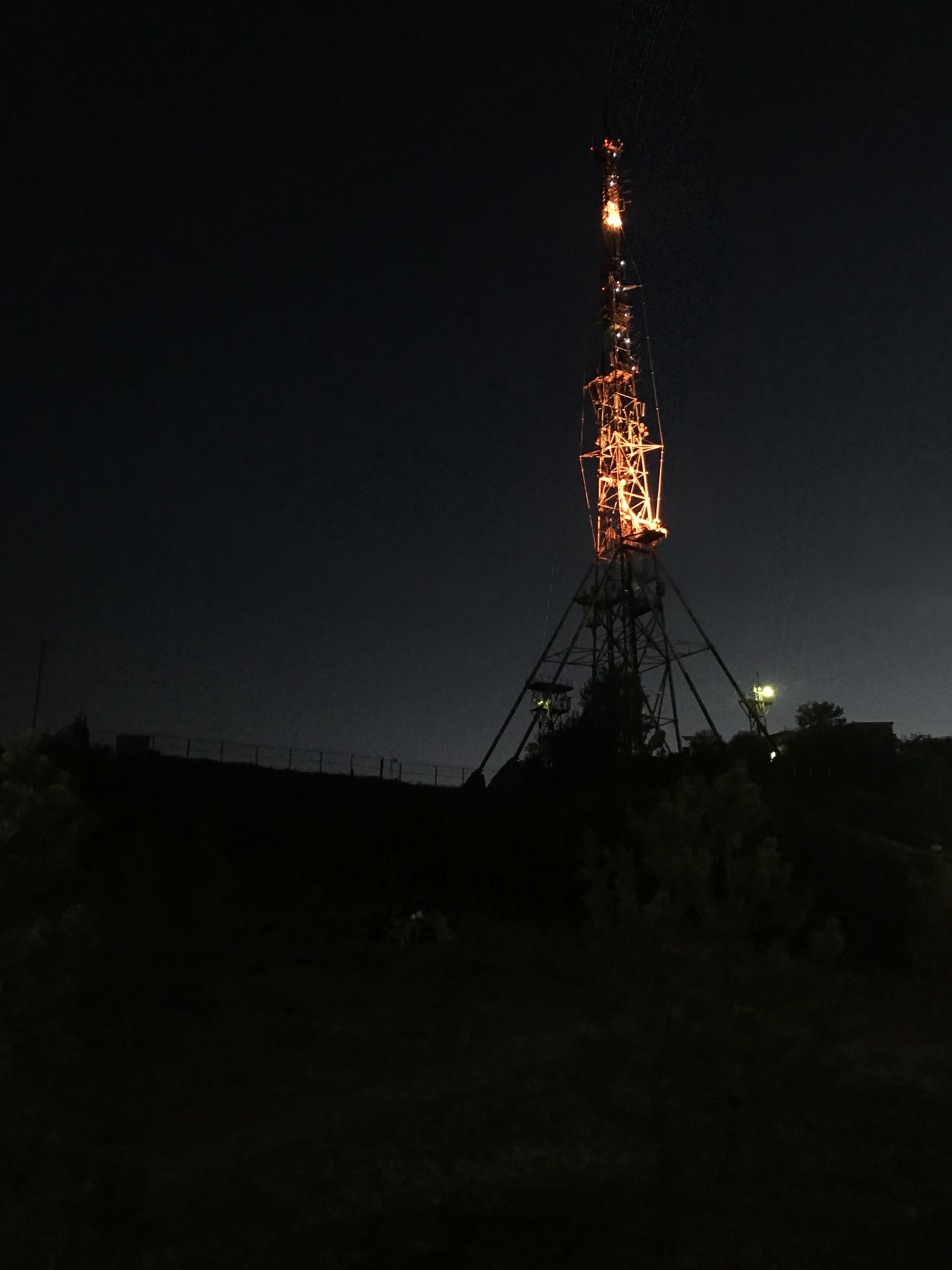
Kokshetau TV Tower broadcasts to Kokshetau.

Kokshetau is the center of television and radio broadcasting in Akmola Region. Many public and private TV and radio channels operate in Kokshetau. Media in Kokshetau covers print media, newspapers, publisher, broadcast, local TV stations, and Internet, with some media having influence over the region. All major Kazakhstani newspapers are active in Kokshetau. The city has a developed telecommunications system.

=== Newspapers and magazines ===
Kokshetau's first newspaper was the weekly Tselinnyy kray, established in 1920, which would change its name to the Akmolinskaya Pravda in 1992. In the city, there are some popular urban newspapers. Akmolinskaya Pravda, Stepnoy mayak and Kokshetau are Russian-language media headquartered in the city. Akmolinskaya Pravda is the oldest newspaper of the city.

- Regional socio-political newspaper "Akmolinskaya Pravda" is a long-running daily local paper, with local and regional coverage.
- Republican newspaper "Bukpa"
- Regional newspaper "Arka Azhary"
- Regional newspaper "Stepnoy mayak"

=== TV and radio ===
Kokshetau television networks:

- Local television news is covered by TV channel Kazakhstan–Kokshetau. It is main city channel. The channel tells about the events of social, cultural, economic life, the activities of scientific and educational institutions of the city.
- Balapan
- Cartoon Network
- Channel One Eurasia
- Channel 31
- Disney Channel
- Euronews
- Gakku TV
- Khabar 24
- MTV
- Nickelodeon
- Qazsport

Kokshetau radio stations:

- "Kazakh Radio": 101.0 FM
- "Russian Radio Asia": 102.0 FM
- "Autoradio Kazakhstan": 102.5 FM
- "Shalkar Radio": 103.7 FM
- "Europe Plus Kazakhstan": 104.2 FM
- "Energy FM": 104.8 FM
- "Radio NS": 105.7 FM
- "Zhuldyz FM": 106.1 FM
- "Radio Dacha": 106.5 FM
- "People's Radio": 107.0 FM
- "Tengri FM": 107.6 FM

=== Internet media ===
- Kokshetau City Administration (in English) (in Kazakh) (in Russian)
- Kokshetau - Kazakhstan (in Kazakh) (in Russian)
- Aqmola News (in Kazakh) (in Russian)
- Akmolinskaya Pravda (in Russian)

== Transportation ==
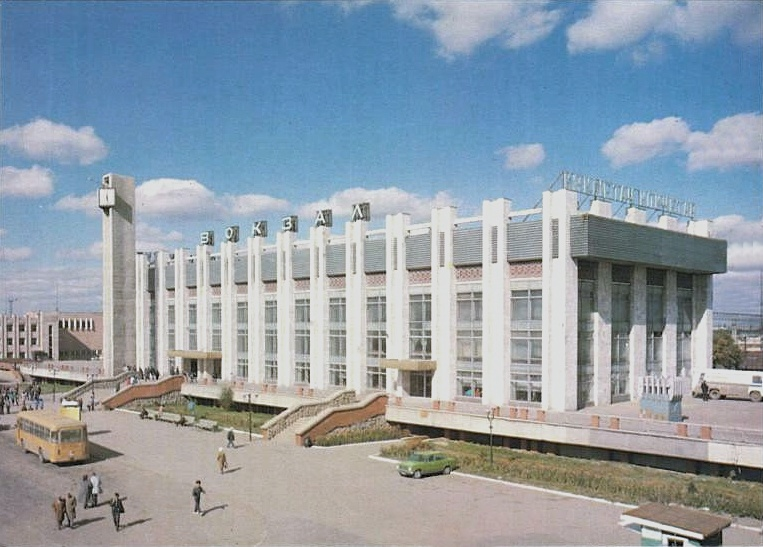
Main entrance to Kokshetau Railway Station, designed by V. Utebekov as viewed from vokzal alañy, 1992

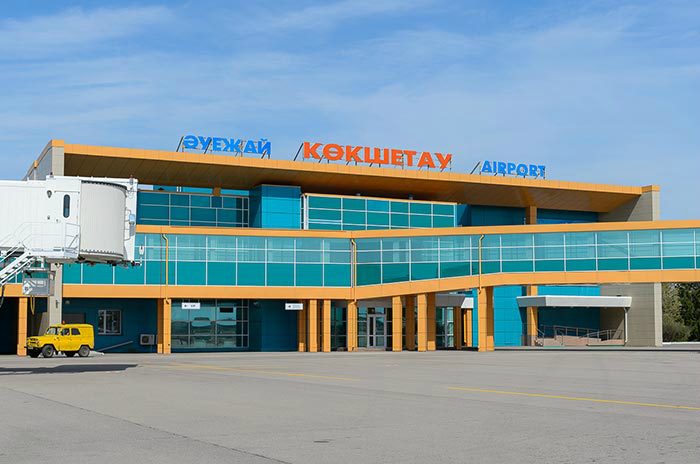
Façade of terminal building and apron area of the Kokshetau Airport (IATA/ICAO: KOV/UACK) near Akkol

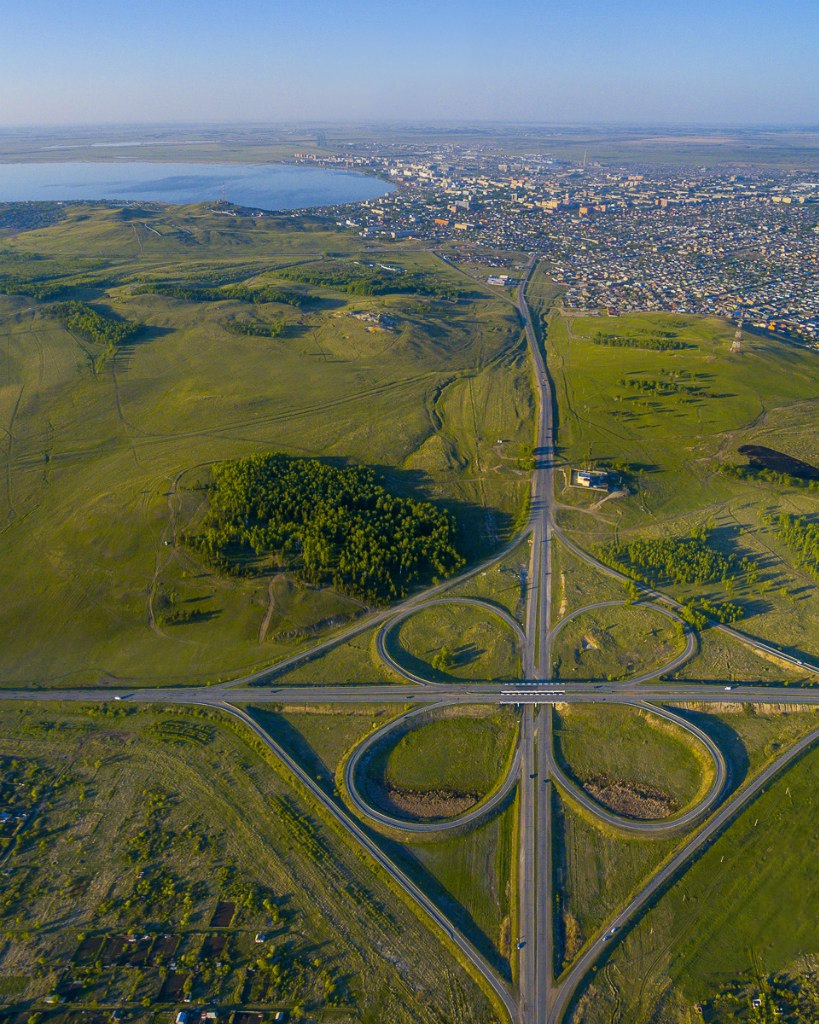
A full cloverleaf interchange near Kokshetau

Partly due to its location, Kokshetau is a major transport hub on the highway and rail networks. Kokshetau has a strong public-transport system.

=== Local public transport ===
The city transport in Kokshetau consists of a network of buses, minibuses (marshrutka; which are GAZelle light commercial vehicles) and taxis that are available 24 hours a day. Public transport in Kokshetau is heavily privatized and mostly handled by private operators.

==== City buses ====
The first bus services in Kokshetau were introduced in 1939. Bus timetables and detailed schematic map of the route are at every stop. Distances between stops are about 300–500 meters. Buses in the city cost ₸80-₸120. Buses, mostly Yutong, LiAZ and MAZ buses, are the most common and popular mode of transport in the city.

==== Public vans ====
In the square between the bus and railway stations gather a range of taxis and minibuses offering rides to Astana or Petropavl.

==== Taxi ====
In Kokshetau taxis are available at any time of the day or night. Ride-sharing services such as Yandex Taxi and inDrive are available in the city via mobile apps. Taxi fare is from 400 to 2500 tenge, depending on the distance from the city center and the results of negotiations with the driver.

=== Intercity transportation ===
==== Railway stations ====
The city is an important railroad hub in the northern part of Kazakhstan. Kokshetau Railway station is served by the Kazakhstan Railways, which links Petropavl to Almaty. The first train pulled into the Kokshetau Railway station on 2 June 1922. Railways are Kokshetau's one of the main modes of intracity and suburban transportation. Kazakhstan Railways (who manage the station) provide freight and passenger traffic to and from Kokshetau.

There are two railway stations in the city: Kokshetau-1 and Kokshetau-2. The main railway station Kokshetau-1 station is located 1.3 km (0.81 mi) north-east from the centre of Kokshetau and includes a main building (built in 1981) and some other technical buildings. Kokshetau-1 station is the city's main station and a major stop for numerous passenger trains traveling between Petropavl and the other regions of Kazakhstan each day. The popular Tulpar-Talgo service to Almaty takes sixteen hours. It sits at the eastern end of the long Abai Qunanbaiuly Street, Kokshetau's central thoroughfare. A tall concrete clock tower guides you to it.

Among the trains passing Kokshetau-1 station are the daily services between Almaty and Petropavl, Kyzylorda and Petropavl, and Karaganda and Kostanay. There are also less frequent trains passing northwards on to various Russian destinations, including Moscow, Yekaterinburg and Omsk, and local electric train services to Ereymentau and Astana.

==== Intercity buses ====
Kokshetau Central Bus Terminal (Kökşetau avtobeketı), which opened in 1981, serves the city of Kokshetau. The bus station is on the Vernadsky Street 8 across the road from Kokshetau Railway Station. It links the city with the villages in Akmola Region and other cities in Kazakhstan and the neighboring countries. Frequent schedules of bus routes connect Kokshetau to Astana, Petropavl, Zerenda, Burabay, Karaganda, Pavlodar, Kostanay, Omsk, Yekaterinburg, Tobolsk, Tyumen and Kurgan. Many of these are cross-country services operating from north to south, for which Kokshetau provides interchange facilities.

=== Airport ===
Kokshetau and surrounding communities are served by one commercial international airport: Kokshetau International Airport (IATA: KOV, ICAO: UACK), which is the seventeenth-busiest airport (2019) by passenger traffic in Kazakhstan. It is located 12.5 km (7.8 mi) north-east from the centre of city, on the route to Omsk, and used to be the headquarters of now-defunct Air Kokshetau. The airport has a capacity of handling 200 passengers per hour. The Kokshetau International Airport, which opened in 1945, was significantly upgraded in 2013 with a new 2850-metre runway capable of accommodating all aircraft types without any restrictions. In 2013, the airport received its first scheduled flight after the renovation to Moscow, Russia. The airport can be reached by car, public transport, or taxi. Seasonal flights to Frankfurt am Main, were available in 2004 but have been cancelled since. It serves mostly domestic flights. SCAT Airlines fly to and from Aktau and Shymkent as well as Qazaq Air operates two weekly flights to Almaty. The former largest carrier of the Kokshetau Airport — Air Kokshetau — is not serving any regular destinations as of 2021.

=== Road transportation and bridges ===
There are a number of municipal, regional and republican roads that serve Kokshetau. The main roads to/from Kokshetau are:

- Republican roads (National Highways)
  - The city is served by the A1, which begins in Petropavl (189 km [117 mi]) and leads to Astana (292 km [181 mi]) passing Kokshetau, Shchuchinsk and Makinsk. European route intersect in Kokshetau;
  - The A13 (Omsk–Kokshetau road), which connects Kokshetau to Omsk (Russia). Kokshetau is located a couple of hours' drive south of Russia's Siberian border;

Other major roads passing through Kokshetau include:

- Regional roads (Regional Highways)
  - The R11 highway connects Kokshetau to Saumalkol and Kostanay (via the M36);
  - The R12 highway connects Kokshetau to Zerendi and Atbasar

There are seven Kylshakty bridges and dozens of grade-separated intersections in the city.

== Architecture and landmarks ==
=== Squares ===
- The city centres on a large and bare Abylai Khan Square, at the intersection of Abai Qunanbaiuly and Kanysh Satbayev streets.
- Independence Square. It is the center of Kokshetau.

=== Old Town ===
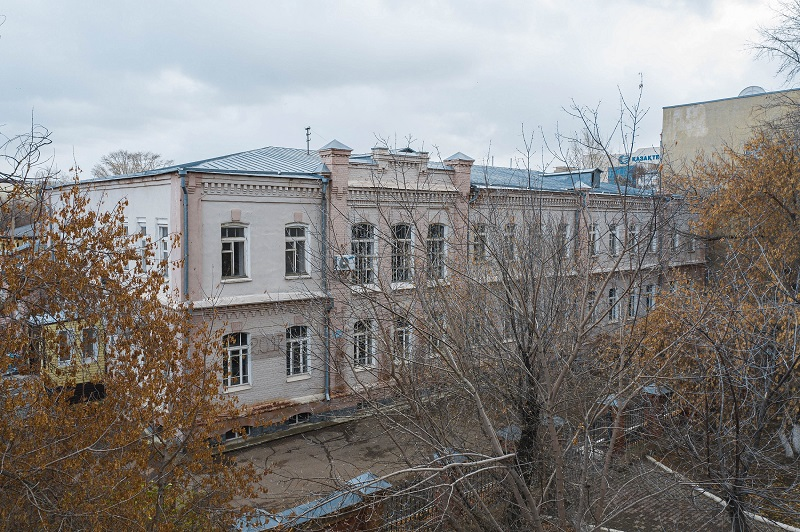
Historical building (1904) in the centre of Kokshetau

West of the centre many attractive single-storey log-built houses survive, usually featuring painted wooden shutters. A couple of particularly fine examples, both enjoying official recognition as historical monuments, are the whitewashed wooden cottage at 22 Kenesary Khan Kasymuly Street, at the corner of Abai Qunanbaiuly Street, with intricate carving at the base of the roof, and the cottage at 33 Felix Dzerzhinsky Street. The latter sits opposite a small Kokshetau City History Museum (32 Kanay-bi Street), itself housed in a single-storey wooden building.

=== Landmarks ===
The city is full of numerous buildings and monuments that reflect its rich and diverse history. The architecture of Kokshetau has been shaped through its history by the progression of historical eras. Many buildings of Kokshetau are ranged from a different number of architectural styles.

==== Historical architecture ====
The architecture of the city dates back to 19th century, the city had numerous wooden buildings with elaborate decor. Kokshetau is the home of a unique architectural tradition and community with number of historical buildings in city. There are a number of two-story wooden houses in the city built mostly in the middle of the 20th century as temporary habitations. Among other notable buildings are the mansions of the merchant Andrei Vasilievich Sokolov (late of the 19th century - beginning of the 20th century), the Akmola Regional Museum of History and Local Lore (beginning of the 20th century).

==== Soviet-era architecture ====
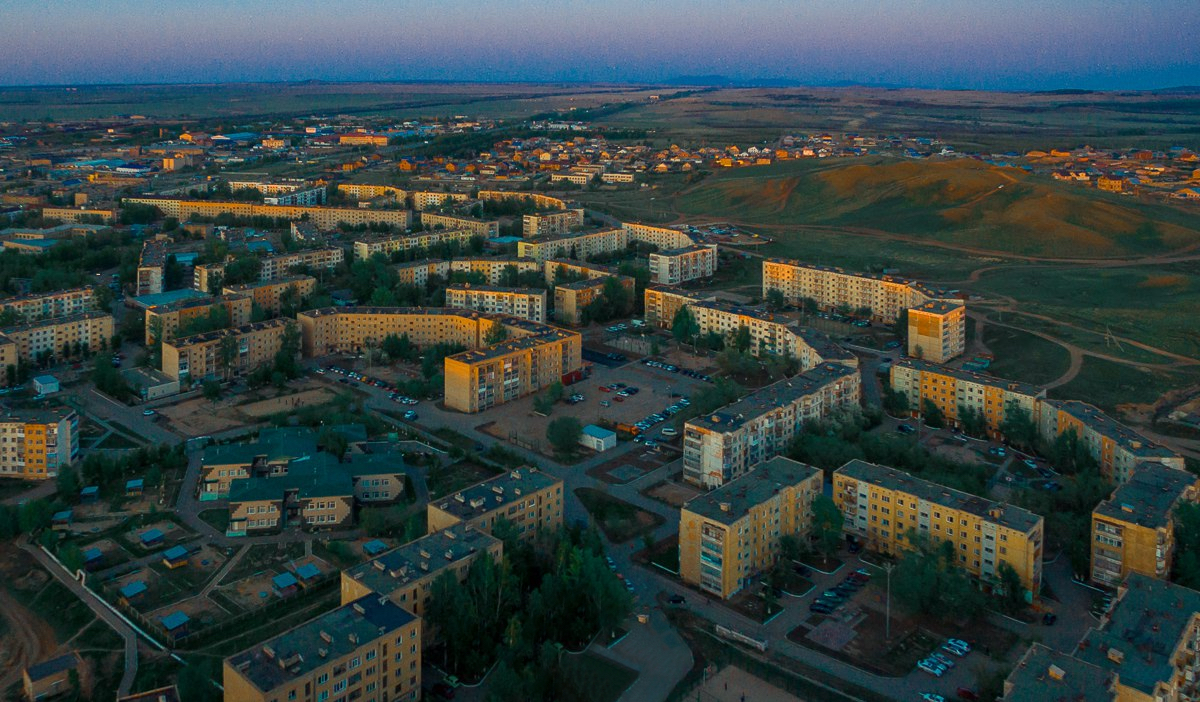
Soviet-style residential area buildings in Kokshetau

Industrialization in Kokshetau started in the late 1920s. The city's 3,000-worker Soviet construction trust built some of the large, gray, faceless apartment buildings that were so typical of Soviet society and still stand, often in disrepair, today. The apartments housed the trust's own construction workers, among others, in units of one to three rooms. The city's apartment houses are called “Khrushchyovka” and “Stalinka” due to the peculiarities of architectural approaches in their construction.

==== Contemporary architecture ====
When the Iron Curtain was falling, but the Soviet Union still was intact, five citizens from the city paid a visit to Waukesha. Among them was then mayor of the city, Askar Khassen, who took the idea of building more single homes in Kokshetau, as comfortable as the homes in the US. On the hilly outskirts of Kokshetau, someone may find the fingerprint of Waukesha County. There are big, expensive, single-family homes. They're inching up the hills. In Kokshetau, the locals have a name for this high-priced neighborhood of single-family homes, "Small America" or "Khassen's Cottages". Prominently located at the opening of this housing development are tall brick pillars, a sign outlining location of lots, and a decorative brick wall, all reminiscent of the gated entries seen in some Waukesha County subdivisions.

When the Soviet Union crumbled and Kazakhstan became an independent country in 1991, the city's construction trust-turned-business began to put a face on their buildings.

== Education and research ==
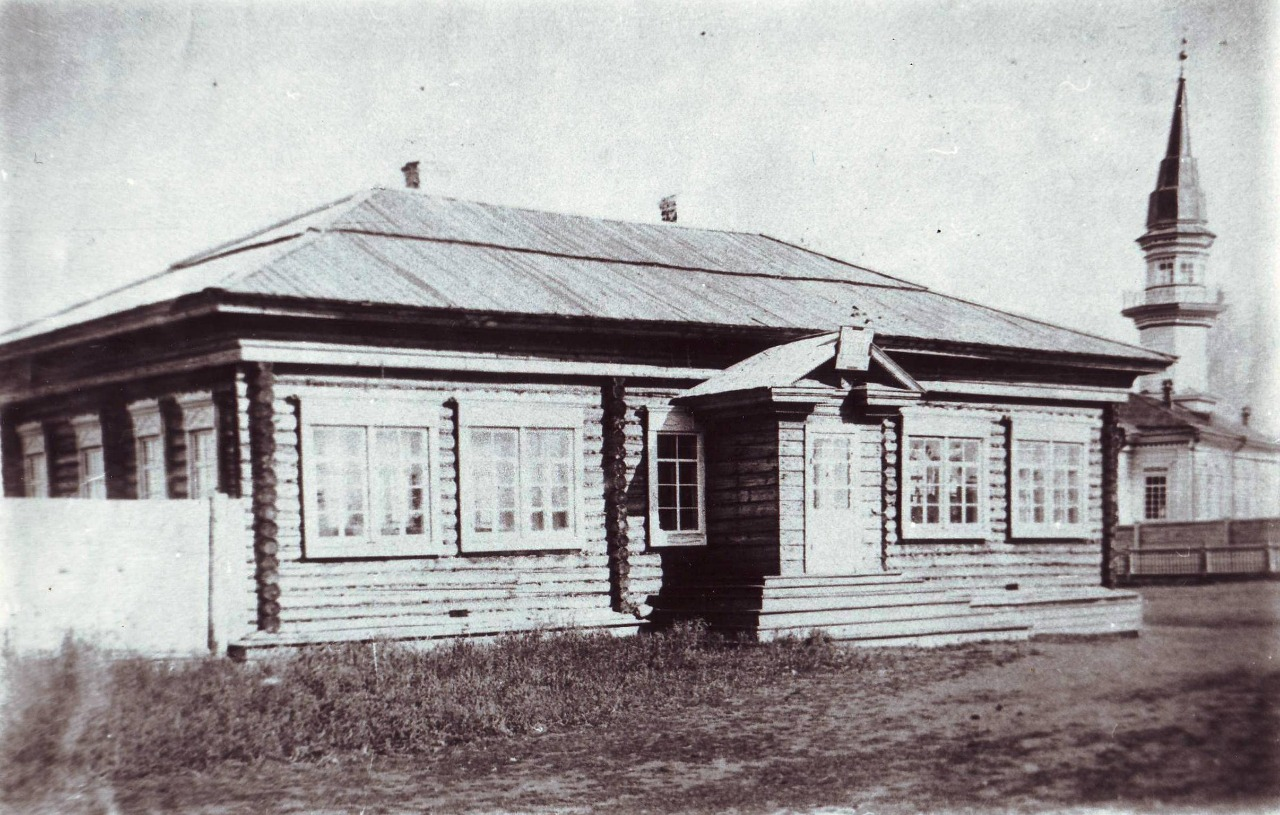
One of the first schools in the city

Kokshetau is a major educational centre in Akmola Region. Kokshetau's education system includes institutions of all grades and conditions: preschool, general, special (correctional), and vocational (secondary and higher education), as well as others. Kokshetau is a regional centre of education and has a large number of educational establishments, including universities, professional colleges and gymnasiums (high schools). Primary and secondary schools in Kokshetau include state-run and private institutions.

=== Secondary, primary and nursery ===
Primary and secondary education system of Kokshetau includes:

- 48 nurseries, 27 of which are municipal, 4 mini-centers - 3 state and 1 private, 17 private kindergartens
- 24 (secondary education) schools, including 6 lyceums and 6 gymnasiums
- 16 colleges
- 1 center for the correctional development of children "Meyirim"
- 5 institutions of additional education for children (the center for extracurricular activities "Aulet", the State Enterprise "Children's Music School", the State Enterprise "Children's Art School" founded in 1979, the educational enterprise of labor training, the center for the development of gifted children "Kokshetau Daryny")

Additionally, there are evening schools for adults and specialist technical schools.

Some of the top high schools are:

- Kokshetau Nazarbayev Intellectual School of Physics and Mathematics (NIS Kokshetau PhM) was established in 2009, as a branch of the Nazarbayev Intellectual Schools (NIS), a network of schools in Kazakhstan.
- Kokshetau Bilim-Innovation Public Lyceum (former “Kazakh-Turkish Lyceum”) for gifted children.

=== Colleges ===
- Kokshetau higher medical college trains intermediate level specialists in eight specialisations.

=== Institutions of higher education ===
Kokshetau is home to most of Akmola Region's major universities. The city is currently home to the following state higher educational institutions that are accredited and licensed to operate in the Republic of Kazakhstan, with more than 12,000 students:

==== National ====
- Kokshetau State University (which is named after Shokan Ualikhanov), established 1962 — offers opportunities to study undergraduate, graduate and PhD programs in most fields. It is the biggest university in Kokshetau with 499 academic staff. The university has over 7,400 students, who have a choice of eight faculties. The main university building located in the city center. Since 2018, a medical faculty has been opened at Kokshetau State University with 740 students, 200 of whom receive grants from the akim (50 grants are allocated annually).

==== Private ====
- The Kokshetau University (named after Abay Myrzakhmet). It was founded in 2000. The largest private higher educational institution in Kokshetau.
- Kokshetau Technical Institute of the Ministry of Emergency Situations of the Republic of Kazakhstan
- Kokshetau Academy of Economics and Management

A number of other non-state-funded institutions for further education operate in the city.

== Sport ==
Sport has always been important in Kokshetau. The city has a long sporting heritage. Kokshetau is a center of Akmola Region sports. A number of well-known athletes, both world and Olympics champions, are associated with the city.

=== Football ===
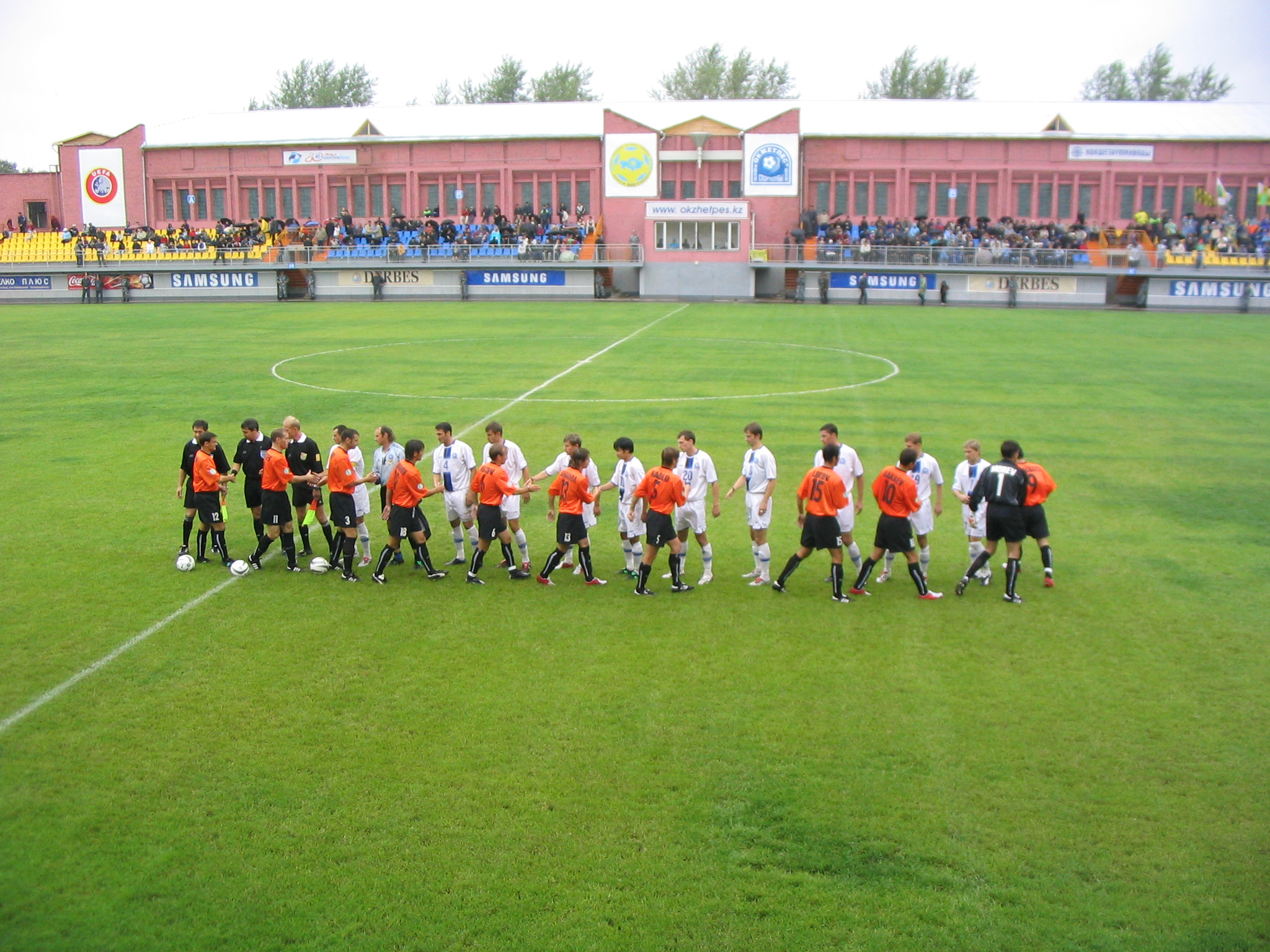
Okzhetpes Stadium is an outdoor stadium that is home to the FC Okzhetpes, 2005

Football and ice hockey are by far the most popular sports in the city. Kokshetau has many parks that provide excellent pitches for impromptu games. The city is home to the FC Okzhetpes football club, based in the Okzhetpes Stadium, and which has a capacity of 4,500, which participates in the Kazakhstan Premier League, the top division of football in Kazakhstan. In 2015 and 2018, they finished first place in the Kazakhstan First Division.

=== Ice hockey ===
Burabay Sports Complex serves as home arena to the ice hockey club Arlan Kokshetau, which competes in the Kazakhstan Hockey Championship. Arlan Kokshetau hockey players were the champions of Kazakhstan in the season 2017/2018. Arlan Kokshetau players also became the first team from Kazakhstan to win IIHF Continental Cup in the season 2018/2019. The city has an ice rink for winter sports. Several sports clubs are active in the city:

=== Basketball ===
The BC Sinegorie of the Kazakhstan Basketball League is the only professional basketball team in Kokshetau. It was founded in 2014 and its home arena is the Triatlon Sport Complex.

=== Infrastructure ===
- Okzhetpes Stadium – stadium with capacity 4,500, home ground for FC Okzhetpes
- Burabay Sport Complex – sport complex, capacity 3,000. Home to Arlan Kokshetau
- Ice arena for winter sports – indoor sporting arena.

=== Clubs ===
Professional sports teams based in Kokshetau include:

Major sports teams in Kokshetau
Club	Sport	Current league	Founded	Stadium	Championships
Arlan Kokshetau	Ice Hockey	Kazakhstan Hockey Championship	2009	Burabay Sports Complex	1
FC Okzhetpes Kokshetau	Football	Kazakhstan Premier League	1957	Okzhetpes Stadium	0
BC Sinegorie	Basketball	Kazakhstan Basketball Championship	2014	Triatlon Sport Complex	0

== Tourism and shopping ==
The hotels in the city have good occupancy year round due to a lot of commuters who travel to work and meetings in Kokshetau. Kokshetau Airport has also conducted renovation projects. The largest hotel of the city is the Dostyk Hotel. The Kokshetau Hotel is located at the Abylai Khan Square at the centre of Kokshetau, while the Green Which Hotel Kokshetau is located near the Amanat Party building.

The location of Kokshetau itself, is an inspiring factor for the foreigners to visit the city in order to enjoy the view of the Mount Kokshe.

=== Shopping and commerce ===
Kokshetau is home to Akmola Region's largest shopping mall, RIO, opened in 2009, which is a major regional shopping destination within a radius of 150 kilometers from Kokshetau and with a floorspace of 252,952 sq ft (23,500.0 m^{2}). Many renowned brands have a presence at the centre including LC Waikiki, Beeline Kazakhstan, Miniso, Koton and Detsky Mir. Attracting over 800,000 visitors a year, the centre's retail areas contain shops (including eateries) from chain stores up to high-end boutiques. The centre has over 900 parking spaces.

Local residents also tend to shop at traditional bazaars: Ortalyk Bazaar, Zhibek Zholy Bazaar, and Eastern Bazaar. Modern shopping areas are found mostly in central streets of the city.

== Parks and recreation ==
=== Parks and gardens ===
Kokshetau is home to a large number of parks, recreation areas and open spaces, mainly established in the early years of the Independence and well maintained and expanded thereafter.

- Central Park, the city's largest and oldest park, established in 1957. It is the oldest city park. It features a few run-down fairground rides, and discos on summer weekend evenings. From the park, the pedestrianised Bauyrzhan Momyshuly Street runs south. It covers a territory of approximately 3,5 hectares.
- Revolution Fighters Park. The park is located in east-southern part of Kokshetau.

==== Fountains ====
As of 2021 the city had 10 fountains.

=== Elikti ===
Elikti is a ski resort near Kokshetau, located on the slopes of Mount Elikti, at the elevation of 500 metres above sea level. The resort area is about 25 kilometres (16 mi) of Kokshetau city by the P11 road on the way from Kokshetau to Ruzayevka. It is popular for its mild climate, a large quantity of sunny days and a great amount of snow through the winter. Visitors can buy or rent any necessary skiing and snowboarding equipment.

=== Recreation around Kokshetau ===
Around Kokshetau, there are numerous nearby freshwater lakes such as Lake Burabay, Lake Ulken Shabakty, Lake Kishi Shabakty, Lake Aiyrtau and the Lake Zerendi, which are popular among Kokshetau residents for recreation, swimming and watersports and can be quickly reached by car.

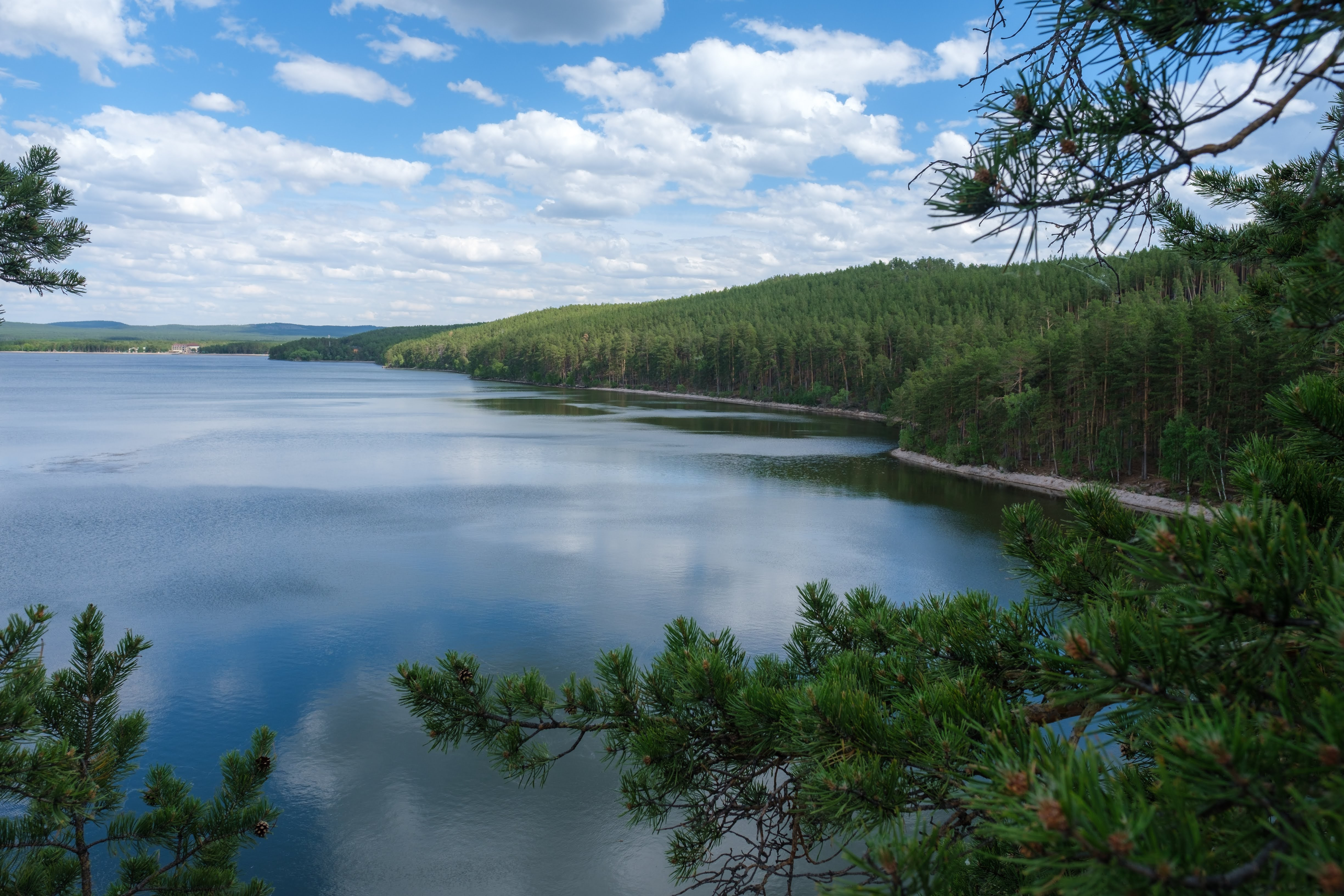
Lake Burabay

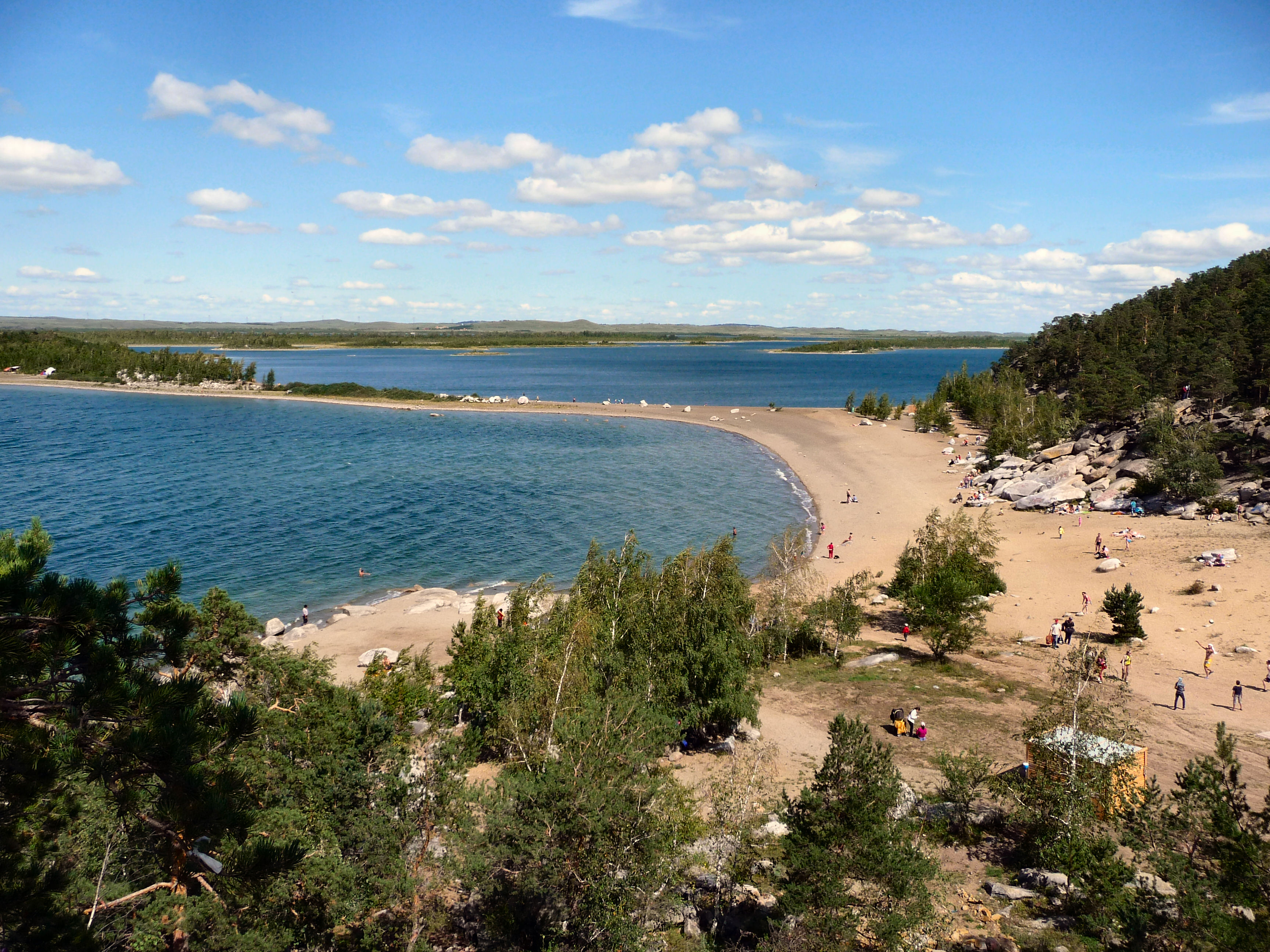
Lake Ulken Shabakty

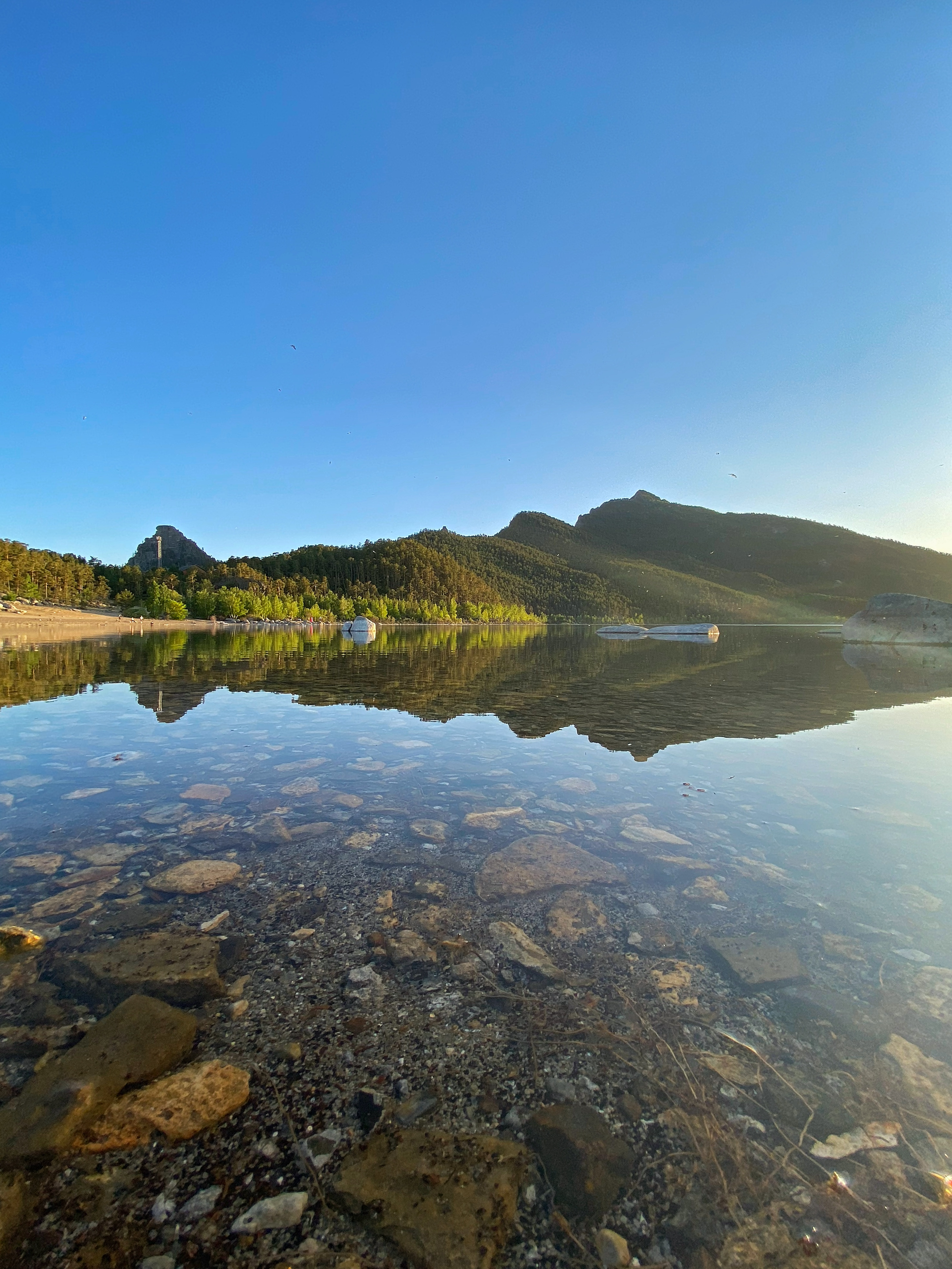
Lake Kishi Shabakty

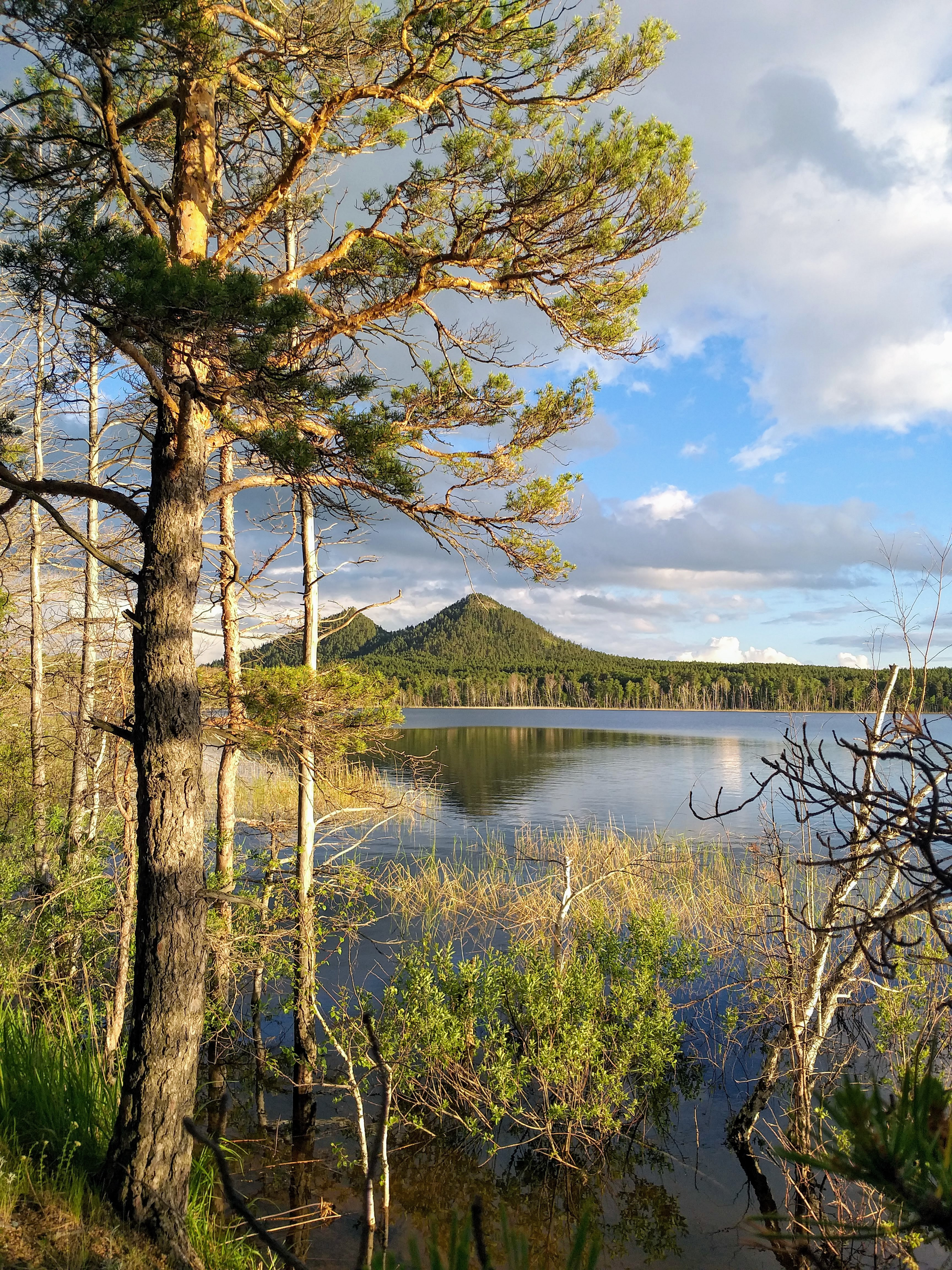
Lake Aiyrtau

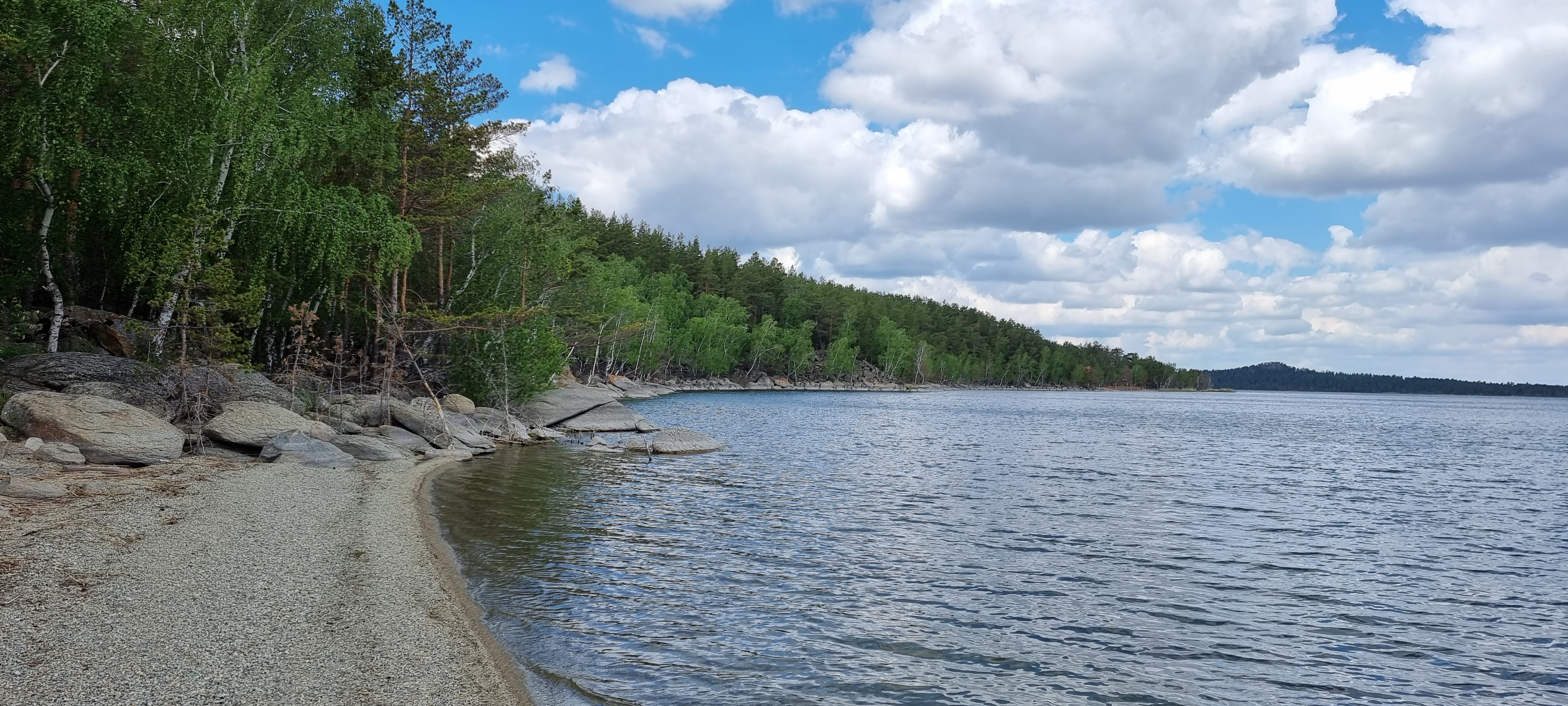
Lake Zerendi

== Significant depictions in art, literature, and popular culture ==
- The city was marked by the ethnographer and publicist Grigory Potanin, who visited it in the 1890s.
- Anastasia Tsvetayeva dedicated to the city the story in her famous and one of the best-known work Old Age and Youth, 1967 (Russian: Starost i molodost').
- The city was depicted and documented from a South African writer and leftist Alex La Guma's perspective in his book A Soviet Journey (1978), who visited it in the late 1960s.

== International relations ==
The city of Kokshetau is member of some international organizations: United Cities and Local Governments (UCLG), and the International Assembly of CIS Countries' Capitals and Big Cities (MAG).

=== Twin towns – Sister cities ===
Kokshetau is twinned with:

- Waukesha, Wisconsin, United States (since October 1989)

=== Cooperation and friendship ===
In addition to its sister city, Kokshetau has an official co-operation agreements (yntymaqtastyq turaly kelısım) with:

- (Russia) Krasnoyarsk, Siberian Federal District, Russian Federation (since August 2022)

One road in Kokshetau has been named after its sister city; a road in Beybitshilik district is named Waukesha (Waukeshskaya) Street.

== Notable people ==
- Nikolay Kuibyshev (1893-1938), military leader

=== Artists and literary figures ===
- Lazzate Maralbayeva (born 1951), French painter and architect
- Bakhytzhan Kanapyanov (born 1951), poet and publisher

=== Sportsperson ===
- Daryn Zhunussov (born 1991), ice dancer
- Timur Dosmagambetov (born 1989), footballer
- Sultan Abilgazy (born 1997), footballer
- Anna Nurmukhambetova (born 1993), weightlifter
- Vedat Albayrak (born 1993), judoka
- Vladimir Niederhaus (born 1967), football official
- Alexandr Chervyakov (born 1980), biathlete
- Yevgeniy Gidich (born 1996), professional racing cyclist
- Gleb Brussenskiy (born 2000), professional cyclist
- Nikolay Ivanov (born 1971), cross-country skier
- Yevgeniya Voloshenko (born 1979), cross-country skier
- Mariya Grabovetskaya (born 1987), weightlifter
- Tatyana Osipova (born 1987), cross-country skier
- Mykhailo Burch (born 1960), footballer
- Yekaterina Babshuk (born 1991), footballer
- Pavel Dubitskiy (born 1982), athlete
- Sergey Kopytov (born 1965), weightlifter
- Anton Kuksin (born 1995), footballer
- Yevgeniy Meleshenko (born 1981), hurdler
- Nikolay Ozhegin (born 1971), judoka
- Yaroslava Yakushina (born 1993), boxer

== See also ==
- Kokshetau City Administration
- European route E125
- Kokshetau Mountain
- Lake Kopa
- Kokshetau Hills
- Kokshetau Mountains
- Kokshetau Lakes
- Kokshetau National Park
- FC Kokshetau
- Kokshetau Airport
- Kokshetau-1 station
- Kokshetau-2 station
- Kokshetau Region
- List of cities in Kazakhstan
