= Kokshetau-1 station =

Train station in Kazakhstan

Kokshetau-1 Kökşetau-1 Кокшетау-1
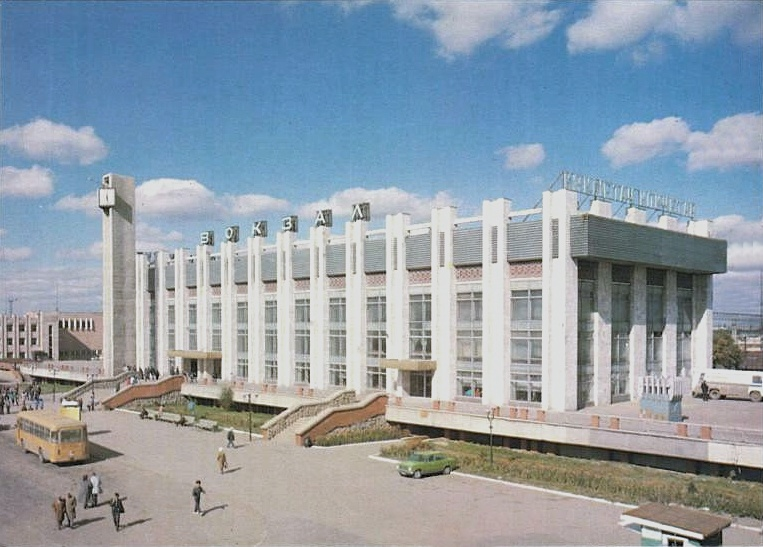
- Exterior view of the station, 1992

General information
- Other names: Kokshetau Railway Station
- Location: 1 Vernadsky Street; Kokshetau, Akmola Region; Kazakhstan
- Coordinates: 53.2881°N 69.4222°E
- Owner: Kazakhstan Railways (KTZ)
- Lines: Trans-Kazakhstan Railway; South–Siberian Railway
- Platforms: 2 (1 island platform, 1 side platform)
- Tracks: 19
- Connections: Railway Station: Buses: 1, 4, 12, 16, 17, 18, 19, 22, 36

Construction
- Structure type: At-grade
- Parking: Yes
- Accessible: Yes; ramps

Other information
- Station code: 687008
- Fare zone: 0

History
- Opened: 2 June 1922; 104 years ago
- Rebuilt: 1949, 1981
- Electrified: 1984
- Former names: Kokchetav I (before 1993)
Location
- Location within Kazakhstan

Kokshetau—1 station (Kazakh: Көкшетау-1 станциясы, romanized: Kökşetau-1 stansiasy; Russian: Станция Кокшета́у-1, Stantsiya Kokshetau-1) also previously known as Kokchetav I station (Russian: Кокчета́в I, romanized: Kokchetav I) is the main railway station for commuter rail and long-distance trains departing from the city of Kokshetau, Kazakhstan, and an important stop along the Trans-Kazakhstan and South Siberian railways. It is one of two stations in the city.

The railway station is located 1.3 km (0.81 mi) north-east from the centre of Kokshetau, the capital of Akmola Region in the northern part of Kazakhstan. It was built initially in 1922 and rebuilt in its current form in 1981. The station serves around average attendance of about 600 people.

The station complex provides long-distance and international services (such as Russia and Belarus), and short-distance service commuter trains (elektrichka) for suburbs, minor city stations, and nearby regions. The railway station sits at the eastern end of the long Abai Street, Kokshetau's central thoroughfare. A tall concrete clock guides you to the station.

== History ==
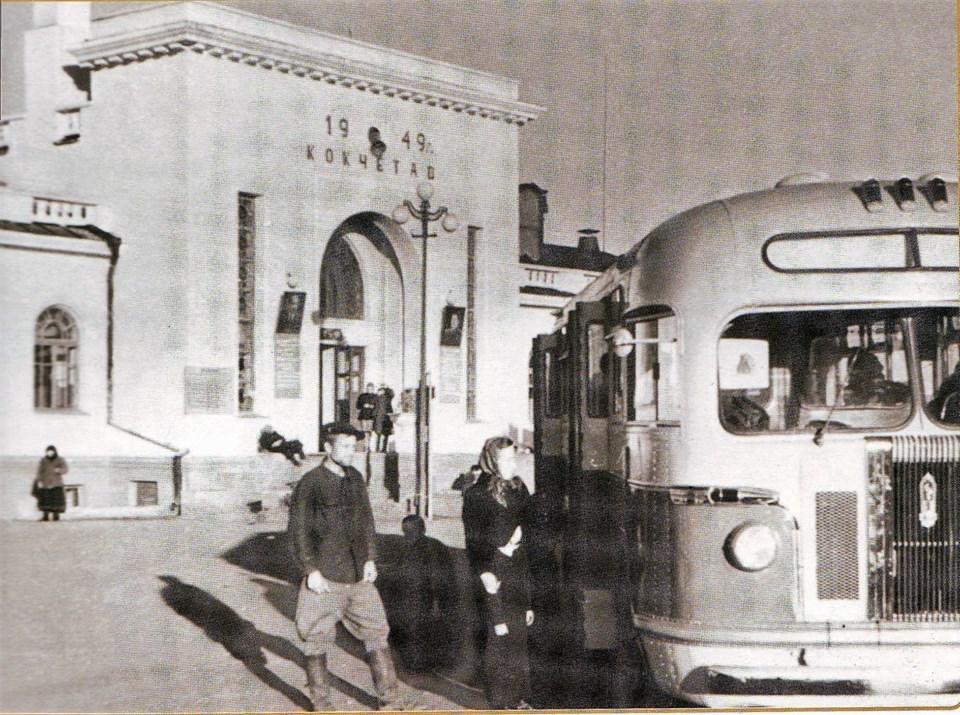
Kokshetau's first railway station building.

The first building of the station dates back to 1920 with the launch of the Petropavlovsk—Kokchetav railway. In August, 1920, a decision was adopted to build a railroad from Petropavlovsk to Kokchetav.

In 1921 the construction of this railroad (263 km) started and was completed ahead of schedule by the summer of 1922 and became the first railway of the Soviet period built in Kazakhstan.

The first building of the Kokshetau-1 station was built in 1922, and opened on 2 June. It was then rebuilt in 1949 and served until 1981. The new building of Kokchetav-1 railway station was built in 1981.

== Trains and destinations ==
=== International ===
Train number	Destination	Operated by
317Б/650Б	(Kazakhstan) Karaganda (Belarus) Brest	(Belarus) Belarusian Railways
317Б/605Б	(Kazakhstan) Karaganda (Belarus) Vitebsk	(Belarus) Belarusian Railways
317Б/083Б	(Kazakhstan) Karaganda (Belarus) Mogilev	(Belarus) Belarusian Railways
317Б/083Б	(Kazakhstan) Karaganda (Belarus) Gomel	(Belarus) Belarusian Railways
317Б/318Б	(Kazakhstan) Karaganda (Belarus) Baranavichy	(Belarus) Belarusian Railways
315Ф/316Ф	(Uzbekistan) Tashkent (Russia) Kazan	Uzbekistan Railways
304Ц/305Щ	(Russia) Kazan (Kyrgyzstan) Bishkek	(Russia) Russian Railways
083Ц/084Ц	(Kazakhstan) Karaganda (Russia) Moscow	(Russia) Russian Railways
353Ц/084Ц	(Kazakhstan) Pavlodar (Russia) Moscow	(Russia) Russian Railways
145Ц/145Н	(Kazakhstan) Karaganda (Russia) Omsk	(Russia) Russian Railways

=== Major Direct Domestic ===
Train number	Destination	Operated by
829АГ/830АГ	(Kazakhstan) Ereymentau	Kazakhstan Railways
627X/628X	(Kazakhstan) Kishkenekol	Kazakhstan Railways
056Х/056Ц	(Kazakhstan) Kyzylorda	Kazakhstan Railways
807Й/808Й	(Kazakhstan) Astana (Nurly Zhol)	Kazakhstan Railways

=== High-speed rail ===
Train number	Train name	Direction	Operated by
705Т/706Т	Tulpar Talgo	(Kazakhstan) Petropavl (Petropavl Railway Station) — (Kazakhstan) Almaty (Almaty-2)	Kazakhstan Railways

== Public transport ==
The station is served by the following municipal public transport services:

- Bus: 1, 4, 12, 16, 17, 18, 19, 22, 36

== Station Square ==
- The sculptural composition "Mother’s Blessing" (Kazakh: Ананың ақ тілегі, romanized: Ananyn Ak Tilegi) placed near the station in 2001. The sculpture of a woman symbolizes the image of a mother who meets and sees off her children and who gives her blessing to them by holding her arms aloft. The monument is made of bronze. Total height is 14 meters.

== See also ==
- Kazakhstan Railways
- Kokshetau Children's Railway

== Gallery ==
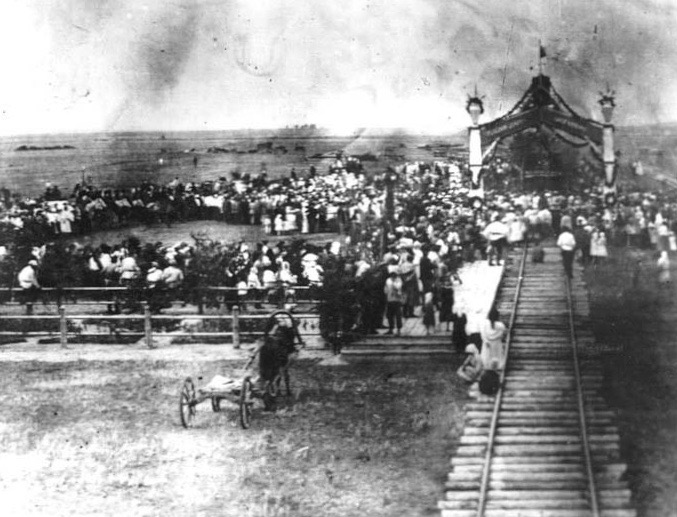
Historical view of the station, 1922
