= Astana-1 station =

Railway station in Astana, Kazakhstan

Astana-1

General information
- Coordinates: 51.1957°N 71.4091°E
- System: Kazakhstan Temir Zholy
- Owner: Kazakhstan Temir Zholy

Construction
- Parking: Yes

Other information
- Station code: ASUZHT

History
- Opened: 1929
- Rebuilt: 1990, 2003
- Electrified: 1984

Services
Preceding station	KTJ	Following station
№39 towards Novosibirsk, Russia	Turkestan–Siberia Railway	Astana-Nurly Zhol towards Arys I
Zhaynak towards Magnitogorsk, Russia	South Siberian Railway	Astana-Nurly Zhol towards Tayshet, Russia
Location

Astana-1 formerly Nur-Sultan-1, is a railway station in Astana, Kazakhstan. The original station can handle 7,000 travellers a day, as part of the infrastructure build up to Expo 2017 a new station, Astana-Nurly Zhol, is located near Mynzhyldyk Alley with a new capacity of 12,000.

The station was renamed to Nur-Sultan-1 after the city changed its name. On 17 September 2022, the name of the city was changed to Astana and the station name was changed.

== Train services ==
Around half of the train services serving Astana call at Astana-1. Most of these are "through" services as the newer Astana Nurly Zhol is a terminal station. Almost all Talgo services that serve Astana no longer serve Astana-1, but many long distance and commuter services remain at the station. A handful of services call at both Astana-1 and Nur Sultan Nurly Jol.
