= Kokshetau Central Bus Terminal =

Kokshetau Central Bus Terminal Көкшетау автобекеті Кокшетауский автовокзал

General information
- Location: Kokshetau, Akmola Region; Kazakhstan
- Coordinates: 53.286389°N 69.421389°E
- System: Public transport bus service
- Platforms: 8 platforms
- Connections: Kokshetau Railway Station Railway Station: 1, 4, 10, 12, 16, 17, 18, 19, 22, 113

Construction
- Structure type: building, covered pavilion
- Parking: Yes
- Accessible: Yes

Other information
- Status: In operation
- Website: Kokshetau Central Bus Terminal

History
- Opened: 1981; 45 years ago (opened)
Location

Kokshetau Central Bus Terminal (Kazakh: Көкшетау автобекеті, romanized: Kökşetau avtobeketı; Russian: Кокшета́уский автовокзал) is a bus terminal located in the city of Kokshetau, the capital of Akmola Region in the northern part of Kazakhstan for intercity, interregional and international routes daily.

Located in the north of the city, it was opened in 1981. Terminal has 8 platforms for buses. The terminal is situated at the address 8 Vernadsky street, and provides hassle-free transfer to the nearby Kokshetau Railway Station.

== History ==
The bus station building was built in 1981. It is roughly 300 metres (330 yd) away from Kokshetau Railway Station. It is a two-storey terminal. The station has 8 platforms situated in front of the east side of the main building. There are about 50 people that are employed in the terminus.

== Services ==
There are frequent buses running to Astana, Karaganda, Pavlodar, Petropavl, Rudny, Temirtau. There are also coaches that service to neighbouring countries. Buses also run from Kokshetau to Yekaterinburg, Omsk, Tobolsk, Tyumen, Kurgan and Bishkek.

== See also ==
- List of highways in Kazakhstan
- Transport in Kazakhstan
