= Brest-Tsentralny railway station =

Railway station in Belarus

Coordinates: 52.1005°N 23.6806°E

Brest-Tsentralny
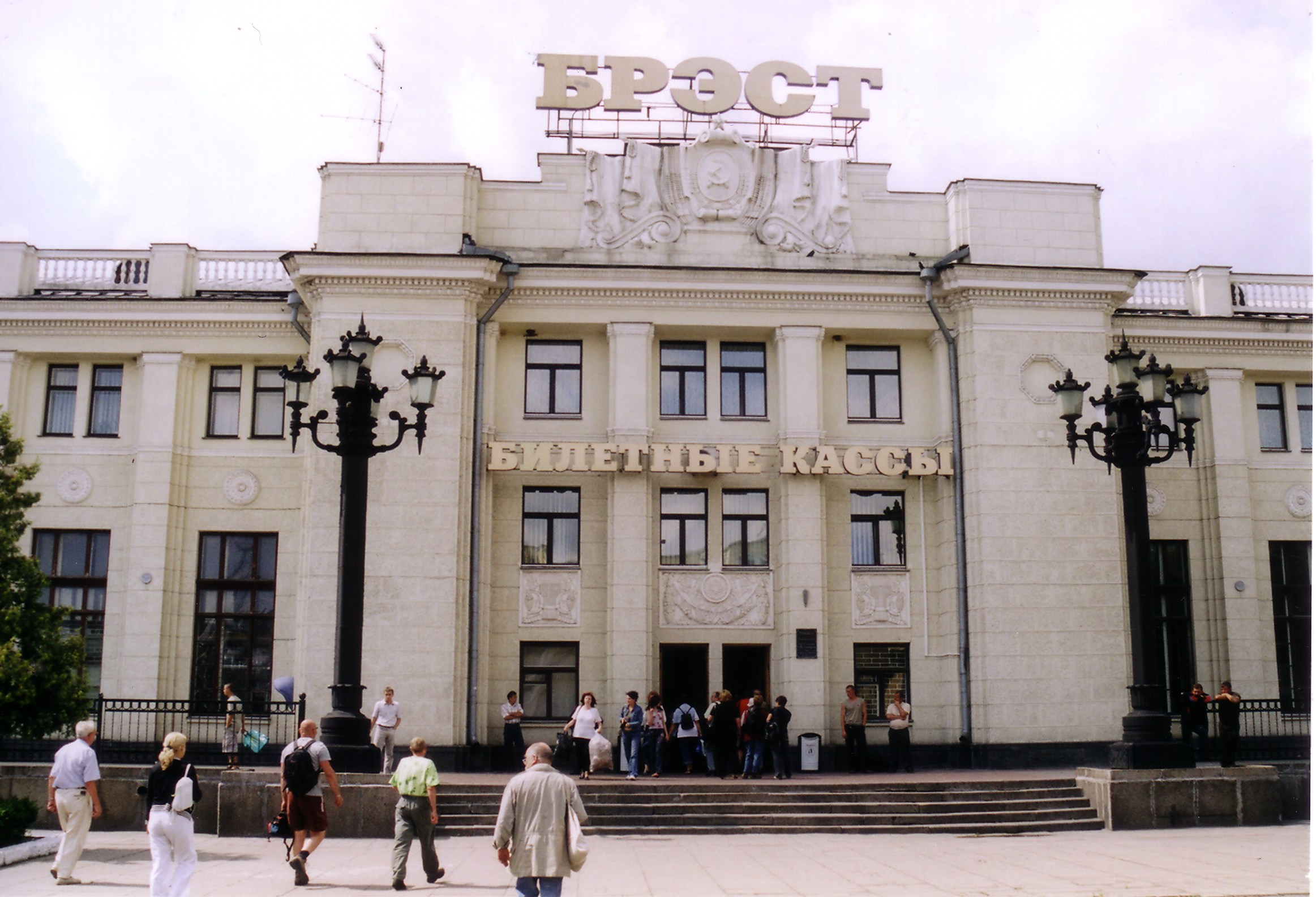
- View of the station from the street.

General information
- Location: Belarus, Brest
- System: Belarusian Railway terminal
- Owner: Belarusian Railway
- Platforms: 5 (4 island platforms)

Construction
- Parking: yes

Other information
- Station code: 130007
- Fare zone: 4

History
- Opened: 1886

Services
Preceding station	Belarusian Railway	Following station
Location
- Location within Belarus

Brest-Tsentralny is the main railway station of Brest, Belarus.

== History ==
The first building of the Brest station was built in 1886, and opened on 28 May in the presence of Emperor Alexander III.

It was built in the form of "medieval castle" with four water towers. The station was equipped with water heating. In the halls for passengers of the 1st and 2nd classes have parquet floors, 3rd class — plank, utility room — asphalt. Soon the station became the first in Russian Railways, have electric lighting — 160 light bulbs of 20 candles appeared in the halls and on platforms and 12 lights on 50 of candles lit up the station square.

In 1915, during the First world war, the station building was destroyed by the retreating Russian troops. The Polish authorities have constructed a new building. Visited Brest in 1949, Marshal Kliment Voroshilov, has contributed to the adoption of the decision on reconstruction of the station, which was held in 1953-1957.

== International trains and destinations ==
Because of the break-of-gauge at Brest, where Russian broad gauge railway track meets European standard gauge, all passenger trains travelling to or from Poland have their bogies replaced here to continue their journey and freight is transloaded from cars of one gauge to cars of another.

Train number	Train name	Destination	Operated by
003Б/004Б	Minsk bel: Мінск, rus: Минск	(Russia) Moscow (Belorussky)	(Belarus) Belarusian Railways
007М/008Б		(Russia) Moscow (Belorussky)	(Belarus) Belarusian Railways
009Щ/010Щ	Polonez rus: Полонез	(Poland) Warsaw (Zachodnia) (Russia) Moscow (Belorussky)	(Russia) Russian Railways
013М/014М	Strizh rus: Стриж	(Germany) Berlin (HBF) (Russia) Moscow (Belorussky)	(Russia) Russian Railways
017Б/018Б		(France) Nice (Russia) Moscow (Belorussky)	(Russia) Russian Railways
021Е/022Г	Vltava rus: Влтава	(Czech Republic) Prague (Hlavní) (Russia) Moscow (Belorussky)	(Russia) Russian Railways
023Й/024Й		(France) Paris (Paris-Est) (Russia) Moscow (Belorussky)	(Russia) Russian Railways
027Б/028Б	Bug bel, rus: Буг	(Russia) Moscow (Belorussky)	(Belarus) Belarusian Railways
051Б/052Б	Zvezda bel: Зорка, rus: Звезда	(Russia) Saint Petersburg (Vitebsky)	(Belarus) Belarusian Railways
065Б/066Б		(Russia) Murmansk	(Belarus) Belarusian Railways
067Б/068Б		(Russia) Saratov	(Belarus) Belarusian Railways
095Б/096Б		(Russia) Moscow (Belorussky)	(Belarus) Belarusian Railways
103Н/104Б		(Russia) Novosibirsk	(Belarus) Belarusian Railways
119Б/120Б		(Poland) Terespol	(Belarus) Belarusian Railways
121Б/122Б		(Poland) Terespol	(Belarus) Belarusian Railways
123Б/124Б		(Poland) Terespol	(Belarus) Belarusian Railways
IC 125/IC 126	Mickiewicz	(Poland) Warsaw (Zachodnia)	(Poland) Polish State Railways
IC 127/IC 128	Skaryna	(Poland) Warsaw (Zachodnia)	(Poland) Polish State Railways
EC 130/EC 131	Báthory	(Hungary) Budapest (Nyugati)	(Hungary) Hungarian State Railways (Poland) Polish State Railways
131Б/132Б		(Russia) Moscow (Belorussky)	(Belarus) Belarusian Railways
133Я/134Ф		(Russia) Arkhangelsk	(Belarus) Belarusian Railways
221Б/222Б		(Russia) Moscow (Belorussky)	(Belarus) Belarusian Railways
317Б/318Б		(Kazakhstan) Karaganda	(Belarus) Belarusian Railways
327Б/328Б		(Russia) Kazan (Main)	(Belarus) Belarusian Railways
675Ф/676Ф		(Russia) Moscow (Belorussky)	(Belarus) Belarusian Railways

== Photos ==
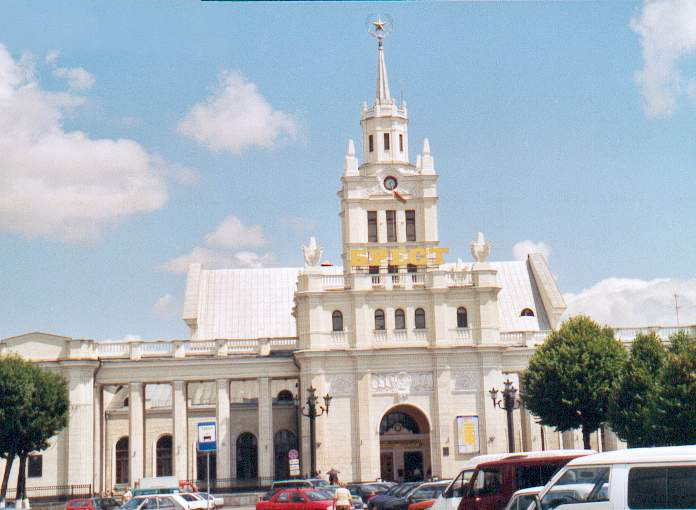
Station building

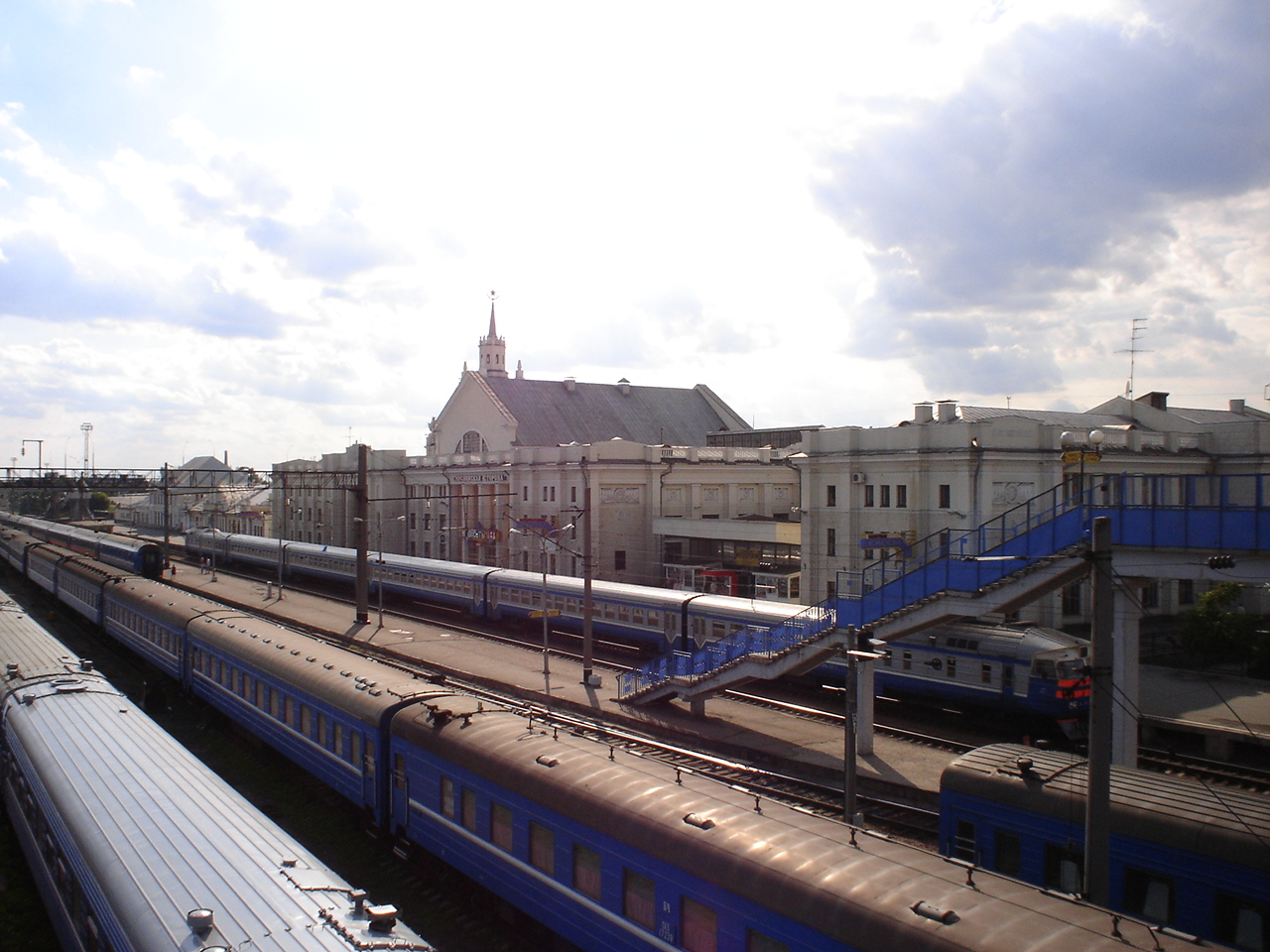
Tracks

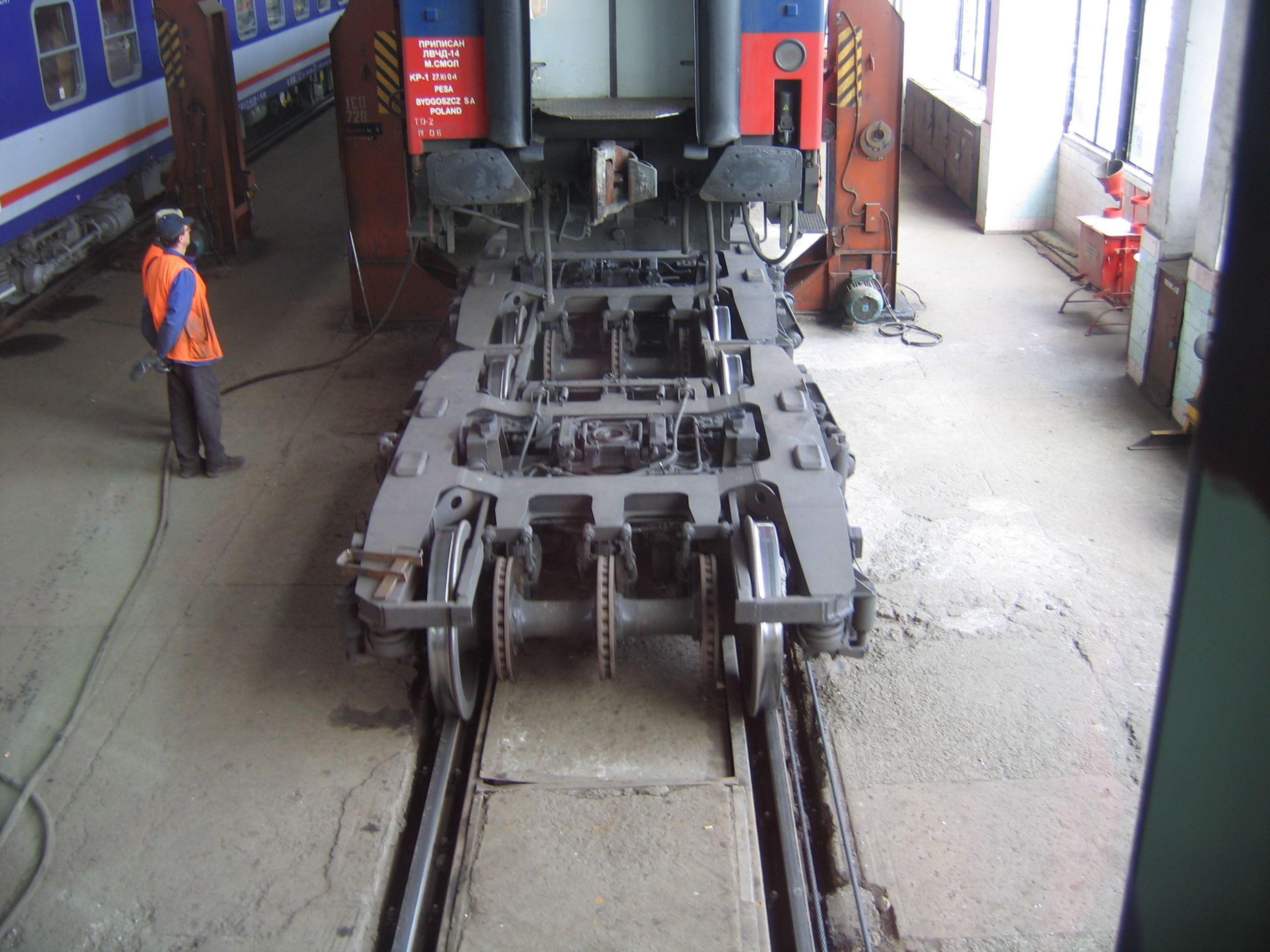
Depot, bogie exchange

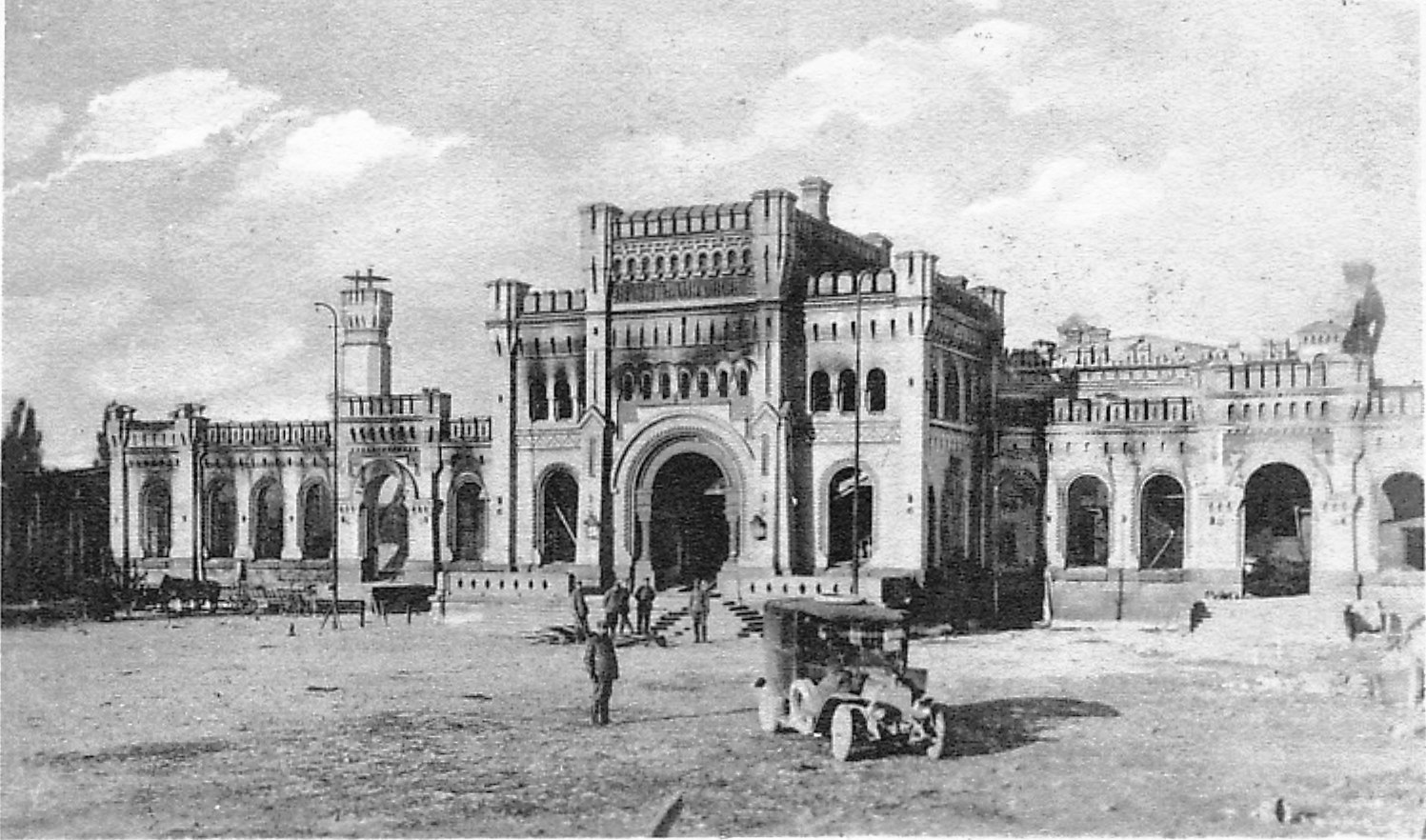
The railway station in 1915)

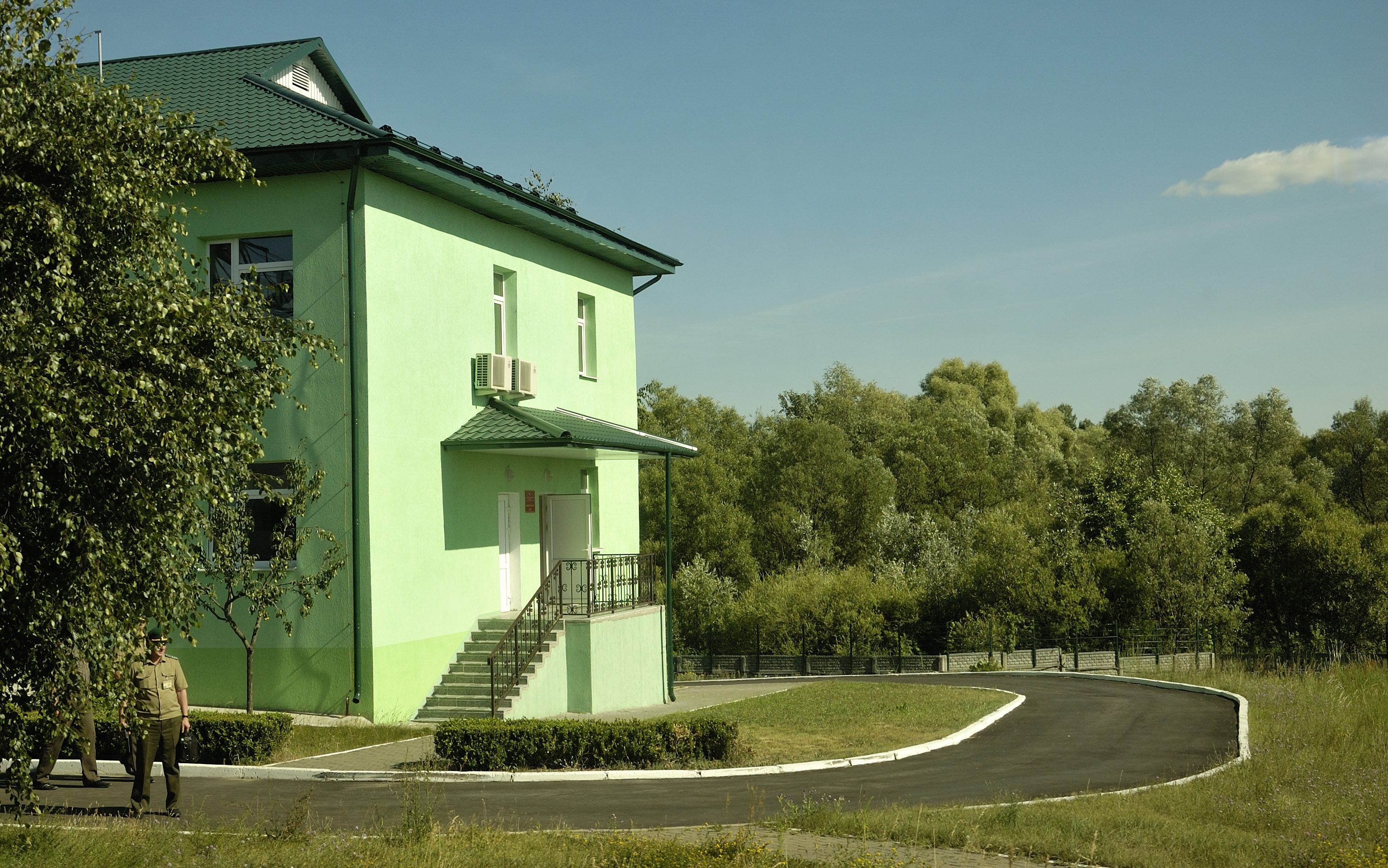
Railroad checkpoint "Bug"
