= Tengri Unitrade CARGO =

Tengri Unitrade CARGO «Тенгри Юнитрейд» «Tengri Iýnıtreıd»

Overview
- Headquarters: Almaty
- Locale: Kazakhstan
- Dates of operation: 2010–current

Other
- Website: www.tengricargo.com

The Tengri Unitrade CARGO is an official of Kazakhstan Railways forwarding cargo agent.

Tengri Unitrade Cargo has implemented simplified tariffs and standardised freight contracts. "Tengri Unitrade CARGO" recently pioneered a new system that microwaves tank wagons to help extract heavy oil residues.

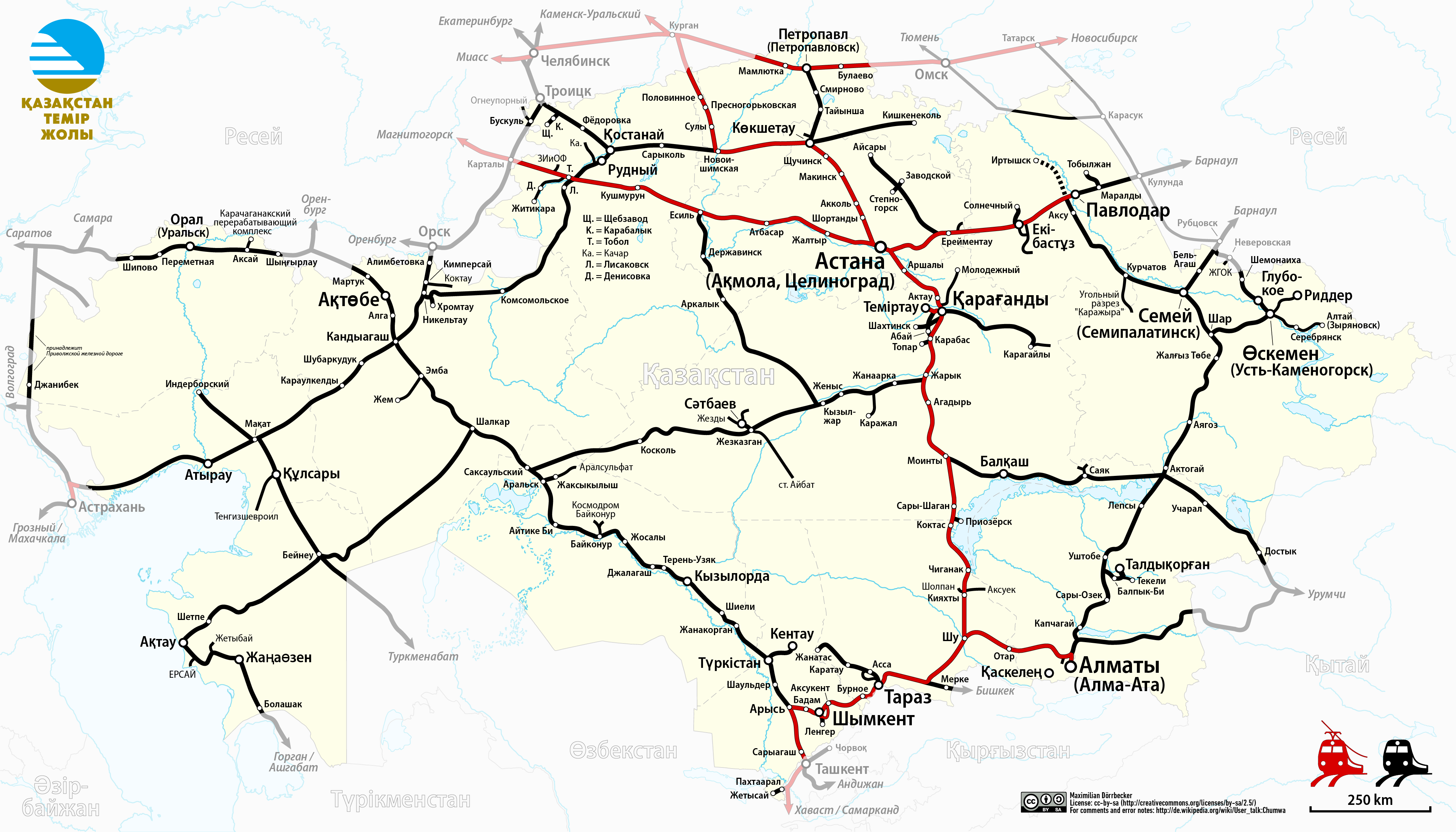
Kazakh railroad system
