= Karaganda railway station =

Central railway station in Karaganda, Kazakhstan

Karaganda
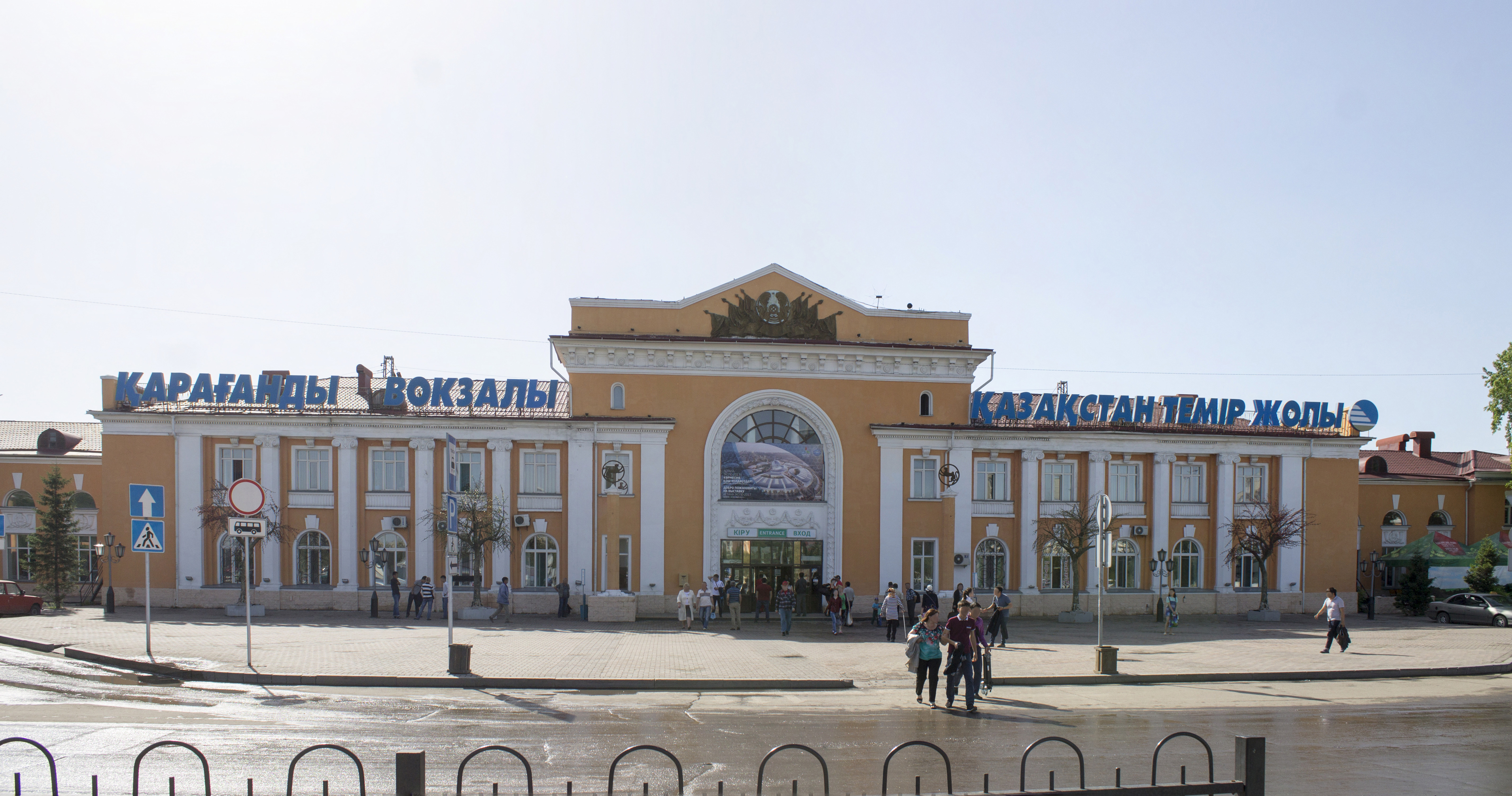

General information
- Location: Karaganda; Kazakhstan
- Coordinates: 49°47′35.8″N 73°5′39.4″E
- System: Kazakhstan Temir Zholy
- Owner: Kazakhstan Temir Zholy
- Platforms: 3
- Tracks: 14

Construction
- Parking: Yes

History
- Opened: 1956
- Rebuilt: 2019

Services
| Preceding station | KTJ | Following station |
|---|---|---|
| Kokpekty towards Petropavl | Trans-Kazakhstan Railway | Lokomotivnoye selo towards Shu |
Location

The Karaganda railway station (Kazakh: Қарағанды станциясы, romanized: Qarağandy stantsiiasy) is located in the city of Karaganda and is owned and operated by the Kazakhstan Temir Zholy. The railway station consists of two waiting rooms for passengers, lounges and a room for a mother and child, contact points and telephone stations, an information desk, and railway ticket sales points. The station annually serves an average of about 1.5 million passengers.

== History ==
Karaganda became a major railway transport hub in 1950, when the Trans-Siberian and Turkestan-Siberia Railway were connected and at the same time, the development of Virgin Lands campaign began, which resulted in the need for the development of a transport and passenger railway infrastructure.

The railway station was built in 1956. The building project was developed by the Lengiprotrans Institute. The architects of the project were P. Ashastin and M. Beniolinson. The foyer and waiting rooms are decorated with bas-reliefs of the Karaganda sculptor Petr Antonenko. The total area of the railway station is 2,400 sq. meters.

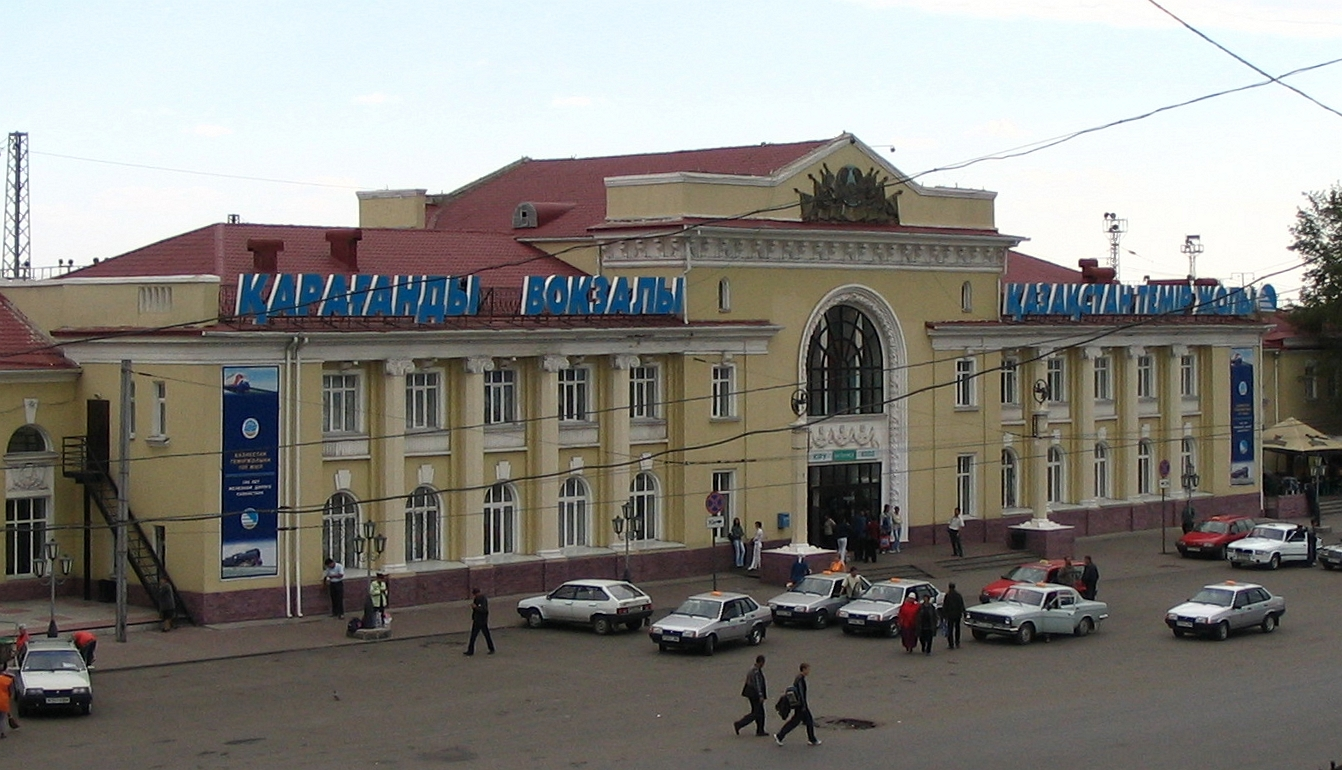
Railway station in 2004

In 1969, a bus station was built next to the railway station, where a large urban transport hub was formed.

In 2018, the reconstruction of the railway passenger terminal began. The project provided for the construction of a new two-story building to serve passengers, while the area and capacity of the complex will almost double. The next stage should be the reconstruction of the historic building while preserving the 1950's style architectural elements. It is planned that the new building will be built in the same architectural style as the old one.

On 26 March 2019, the railway station building was temporarily closed for reconstruction. During that period, passengers were served in the building of the bus station and on the platform.
