= Astana-Nurly Zhol station =

Main railway station of Astana, Kazakhstan

Astana-Nurly Zhol Астана Нұрлы жол
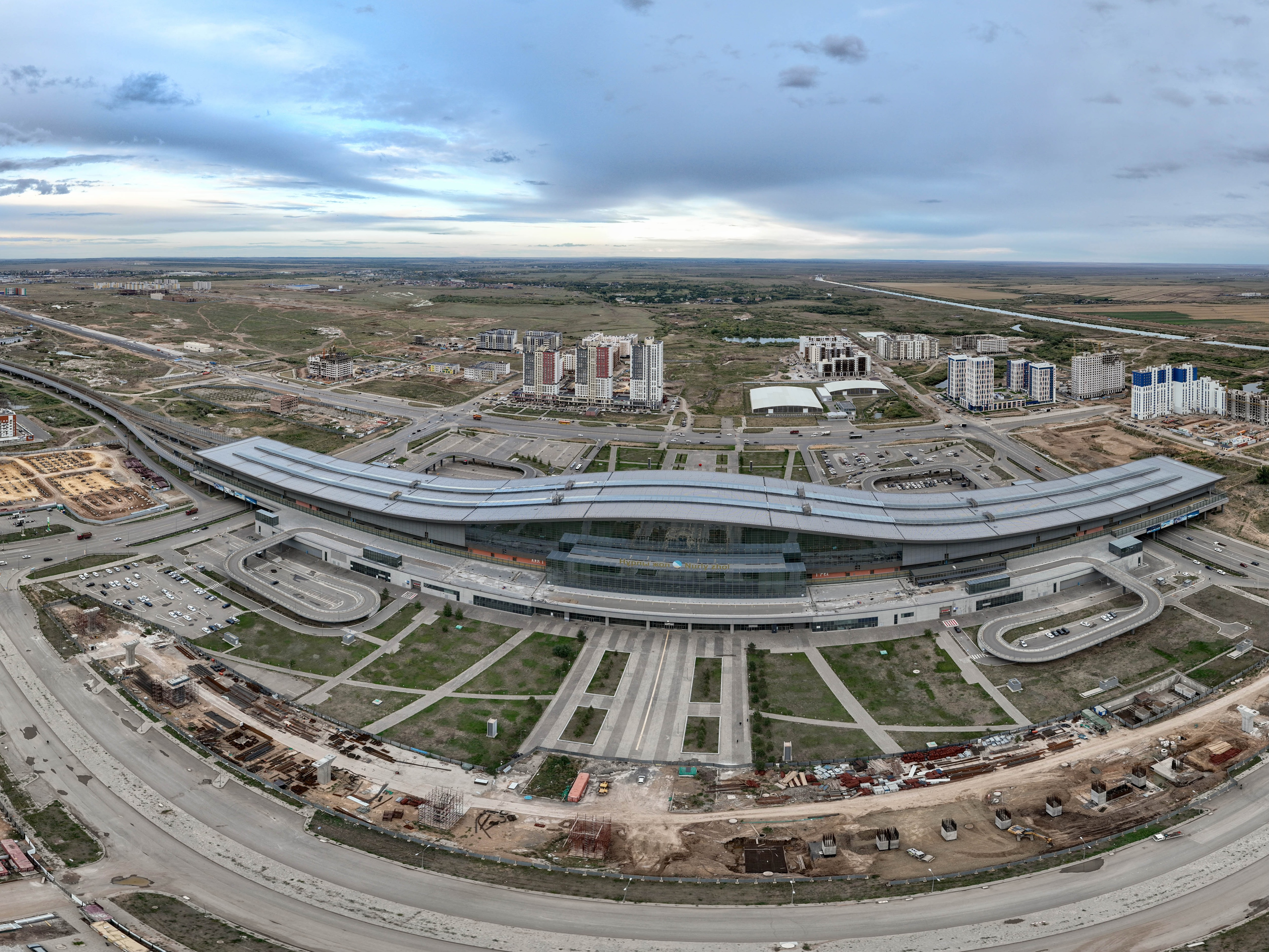
- Station building

General information
- Coordinates: 51.112389°N 71.531752°E
- Owner: Kazakhstan Temir Zholy

Construction
- Parking: Yes

History
- Opened: 1 June 2017

Services
Preceding station	KTJ	Following station
Astana-1 towards Novosibirsk, Russia	Turkestan–Siberia Railway	Sorokovaya towards Arys I
Astana-1 towards Magnitogorsk, Russia	South Siberian Railway	Sorokovaya towards Tayshet, Russia
Location

Astana-Nurly Zhol (Kazakh: Acтана-Нұрлы жол, Astana-Nurly Jol) is a main train station and bus station in Astana, the capital of Kazakhstan. As part of the infrastructure build up to Expo 2017, the station is located near Mynzhyldyk Alley with a new capacity of 35,000. It was opened on June 1, 2017.

The 45,000 ft² station building has an enclosed space of 110,000m², a 70,000m² car park and 2,550m long railway platforms. It was designed by the Turkish company Tabanlıoğlu Architects. The design was awarded first place in the MIPIM AR Future Projects Award.

In October 2018, a bus station named Saparjai-2 was opened inside the building. The total area of the parking lot for buses and cars is 8600 sq. m. From 2019-2022 the station was named Nur-Sultan-Nurly Zhol after the city changed its name in March 2019.

== Train Services ==
Around half of the train services serving Astana call at Astana Nurly Zhol. Most of these services originate/terminate here, rather than "through" services as this is a terminal station. Almost all Talgo services that serve Astana use this station. A handful of services call at both Astana-1 and Astana-Nurly Zhol.
