= Petropavl railway station (Kazakhstan) =

Railway station in Petropavlovsk, Kazakhstan

Petropavl Railway Station
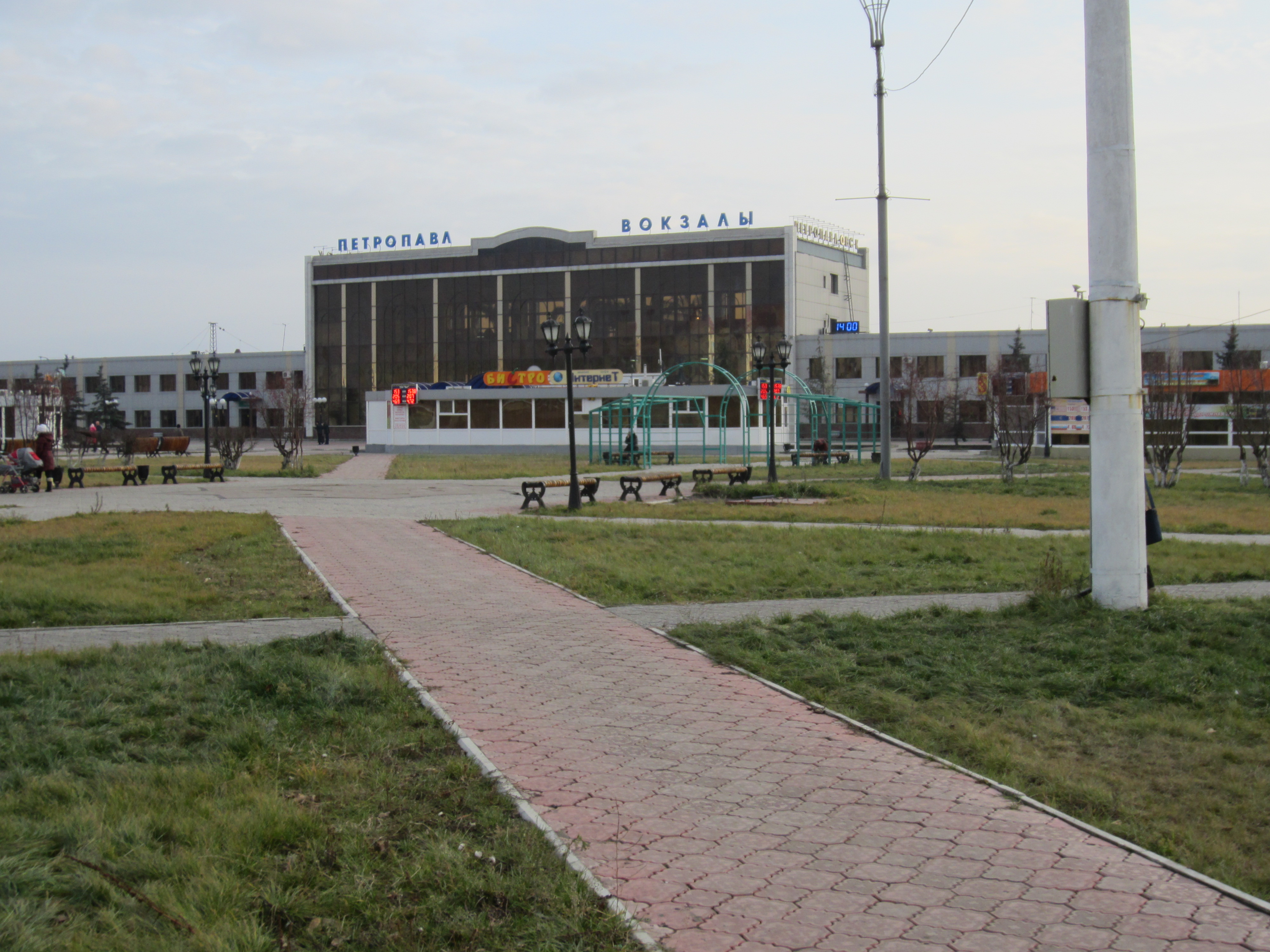

General information
- Coordinates: 54°51′23″N 69°10′11″E
- System: South Urals Railway terminal
- Owner: Russian Railways (South Urals Railway)

Construction
- Parking: Yes

Other information
- Station code: ASUZHT

History
- Opened: 1894
- Rebuilt: 1904

Services
| Preceding station | KTJ | Following station |
|---|---|---|
| Terminus | Trans-Kazakhstan Railway | Zhanaturmys towards Shu |
| Preceding station | Russian Railways | Following station |
| Zaton towards Chelyabinsk | Chelyabinsk–Omsk | 2639 km towards Omsk |
Location

Petropavl Railway Station is a railway station in Petropavl, Kazakhstan.

== Buildings ==
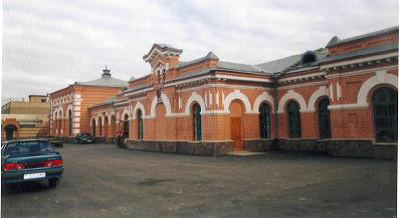
The Railway Station Building. Petropavlovsk

The Railway Station Building, Petropavl is located on the Railway Station Square in Petropavl, Kazakhstan. The building of the railway station was built in two stages: the construction of the first stage was completed in December 1895; the second stage of the building (restaurant, auxiliary services of the railway station) was completed in 1904.

The building is one-storey, brick-built. In a later period (presumably in the 1950s), the outer surface of the walls was plastered and coloured in two colours. Now (to the 100th anniversary of the West Siberian Railway) the building has been restored and brought into full compliance with the original project.

The building has a complex shape in plan. Separate rooms are different, in their horizontal and high-altitude dimensions, are united among themselves into a single volume stretched along the railway platform. The monument has roofing wooden structures covered with iron. The main hall and some rooms inside have vaulted ceilings, which facilitates the circulation of air inside. Large windows provide good illumination, framed by a figured masonry. The building is built in the style of "late Baroque". At present, the building is used as the luggage compartment of the railway station and warehouses.

The building is a sample of the historical layout of the city, typical for late nineteenth and early twentieth centuries, expressed in the planned integrated construction of brick buildings of public use and is the architectural heritage of the city.

== Destinations ==
| Train number | Train name | Destination | Operated by |
|---|---|---|---|
| 015Т/016Т | Zhetysu; Жетису | (Kazakhstan) Almaty (Almaty-2) | Kazakhstan Temir Zholy |
| 059Н/059С | | (Russia) Kislovodsk (Russia) Novokuznetsk | (Russia) Russian Railways |
| 076Х/076Ц | | (Kazakhstan) Kyzylorda | Kazakhstan Temir Zholy |
| 089У/090У | Zauralye; Зауралье | (Russia) Moscow (Kazansky) | (Russia) Russian Railways |
| 123Н/124В | | (Russia) Belgorod (Russia) Novosibirsk | (Russia) Russian Railways |
| 133Н/133С | | (Russia) Anapa (Russia) Tomsk | (Russia) Russian Railways |
| 211Н | | (Russia) Chelyabinsk (Russia) Omsk | (Russia) Russian Railways |
| 623Т/624Т | | (Kazakhstan) Nur-Sultan (Nurly Zhol) | Kazakhstan Temir Zholy |
| 705Т/706Т | | (Kazakhstan) Almaty (Almaty-2) | Kazakhstan Temir Zholy |
| 6973/6974 | | (Russia) Isilkul | Kazakhstan Temir Zholy |
| 6975/6976 | | (Russia) Petukhovo | Kazakhstan Temir Zholy |
| 6979/6980 | | (Russia) Isilkul | Kazakhstan Temir Zholy |

== Sources ==
- ГАСКО. Ф. 3037. Инв. No. 7263, 7264.
- Северо-Казахстанская область. Энциклопедия. Алматы. 2004. Сс. 200–201, 435–437.
