= Tayshet railway station =

Railway station in Tayshet, Russia

Tayshet Тайшет
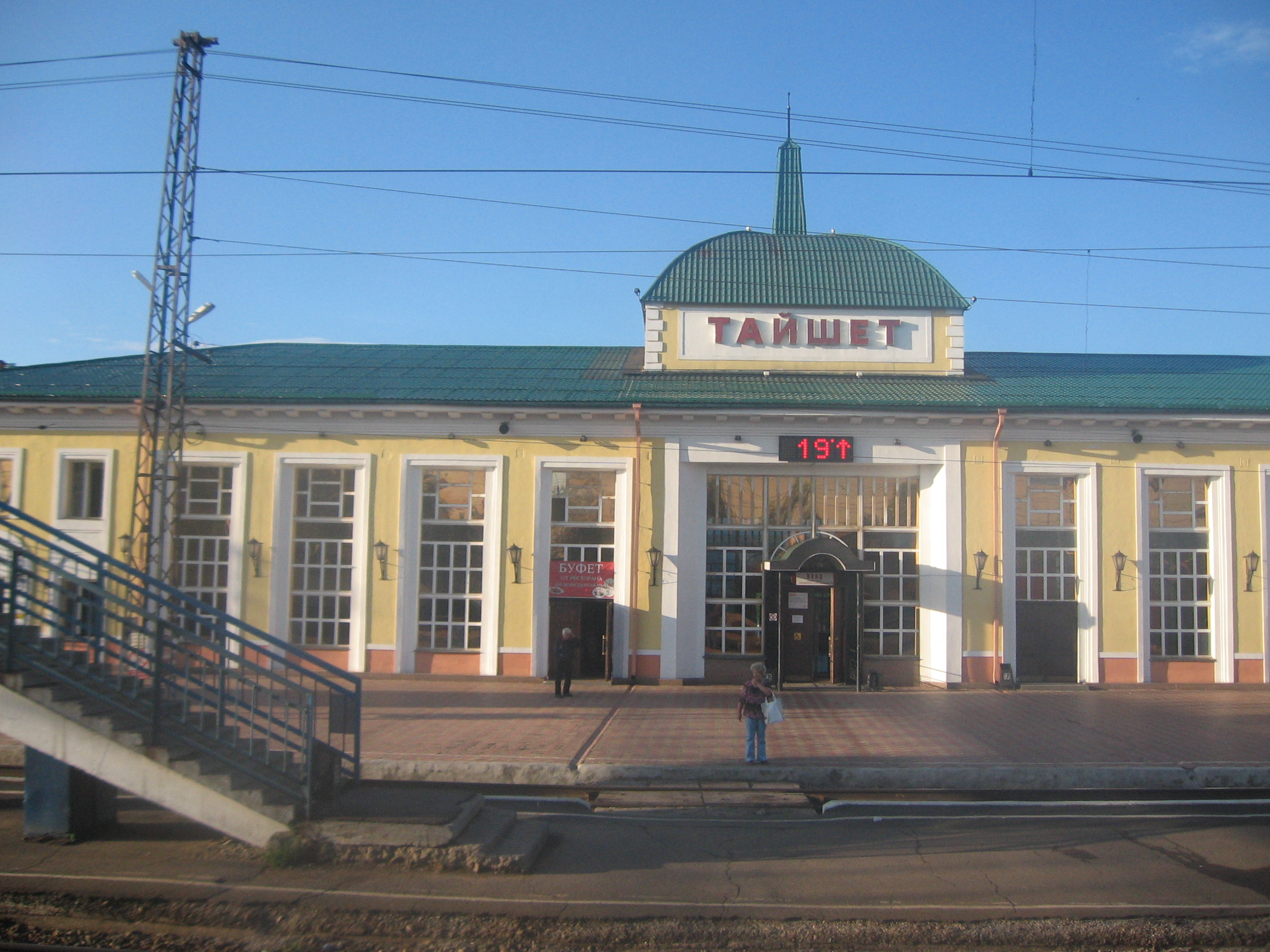
- Tayshet Railway Station

General information
- Location: Tayshet, Russia
- Coordinates: 55°56′20″N 98°00′04″E
- Owner: Russian Railways

Construction
- Parking: yes

Other information
- Station code: 920002
- Fare zone: 0

History
- Opened: 1899

Services
Preceding station	Russian Railways	Following station
Biryusinsk towards Moscow Yaroslavsky	Moscow–Vladivostok	Razgon towards Vladivostok
Terminus	Baikal–Amur Mainline	Anzyobi towards Sovetskaya Gavan
Preceding station	KTJ	Following station
Tashul towards Magnitogorsk, Russia	South Siberian Railway	Terminus
Location

Tayshet Railway station is a passenger railway station for the city of Tayshet in Russia. This station belongs to Trans-Siberian Railway, and it is the origin station of Baikal–Amur Mainline.

== Trains ==
- Moscow — Vladivostok
- Moscow — Beijing
- Moscow — Ulaanbaatar
- Novosibirsk — Vladivostok
- Moscow — Khabarovsk
- Novosibirsk — Neryungri
- Moscow — Ulan Ude
- Adler — Irkutsk
- Adler — Chita
