= Kazan railway station =

Railway station in Kazan, Tatarstan, Russia

Coordinates: 55°47′17″N 49°06′03″E

Kazan Казань
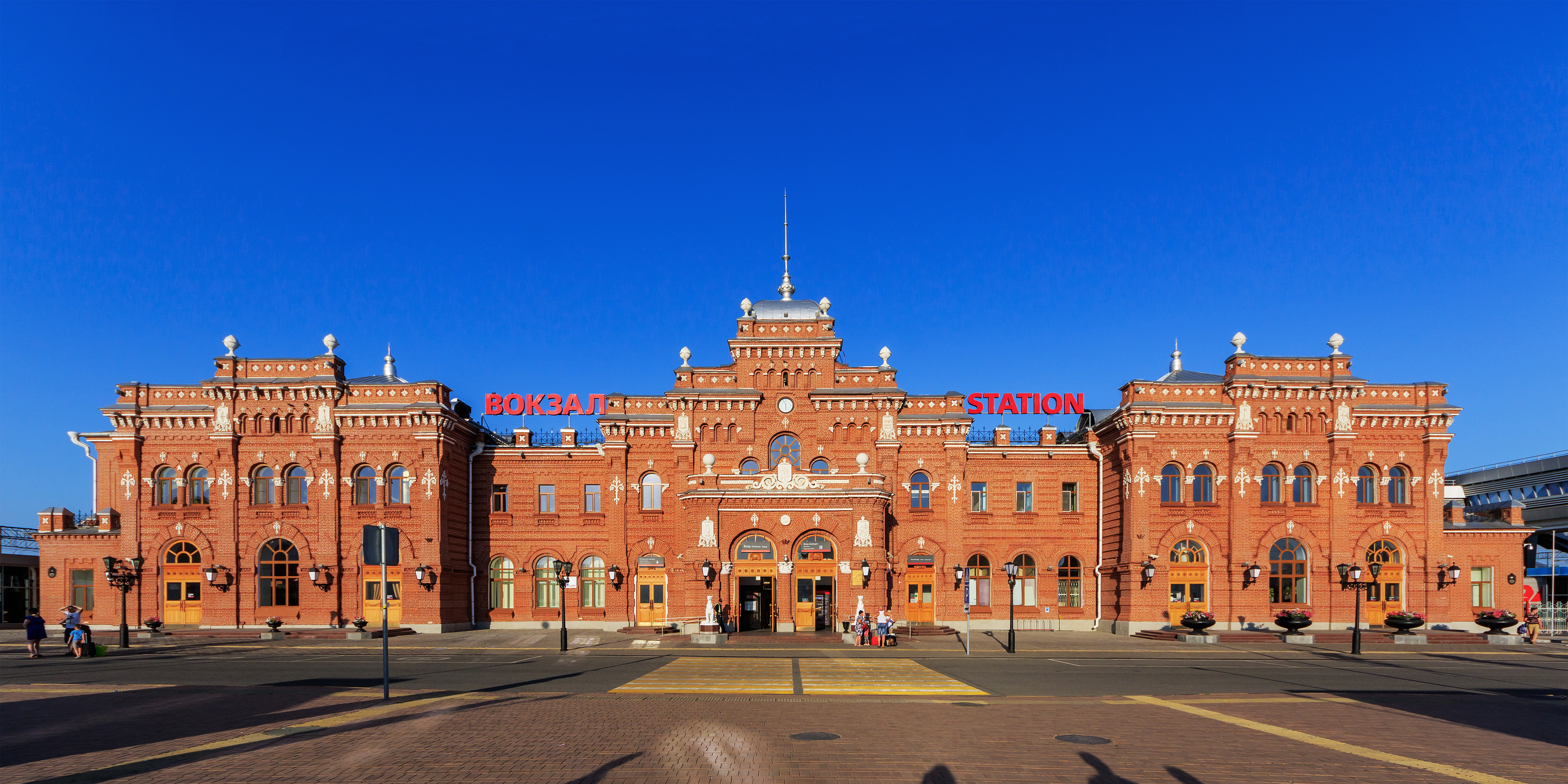
- View of the station from street.

General information
- Location: Russia, Kazan
- System: Gorky Railway terminal
- Owner: Russian Railways (Gorky Railway)
- Platforms: 7 (6 island platforms)
- Tracks: 15

Construction
- Parking: yes

Other information
- Station code: 250302
- Fare zone: 0

History
- Opened: 1894

Services
Preceding station	Gorky Railway	Following station
Location

Kazan-Passazhirskaya (Russian: Казань-Пассажирская) is a railway station in the capital of Tatarstan — Kazan in Russia.

== Main information ==
It includes the main building (a city landmark built in 1896), suburban terminal (built in 1967 and renovated in 2005) and the service building, as well as a number of office buildings (all built in the late 20th or early 21st century). The railway station serves the 36 pairs of long-distance trains (including 13 of local formation) as well as commuter trains and diesel trains (rail bus) sent from the corresponding dead-end platforms in the western and eastern directions. Per year the station serves more than 8 million passengers. It has 15 routes, several low platforms and an elevated passage above the tracks.

== History ==
The station was opened shortly after the construction of the Moscow-Kazan railway in 1893. In Soviet times the station was run by the Kazan Branch of the Gorky Railway. In 1992 the main building suffered a severe fire and was rebuilt by 1997. By the Millennium of Kazan in 2005 the suburban terminal and the square before the main building underwent reconstruction.

As a preparation for the 2013 Summer Universiade, Russian Railways plans to create a high-speed rail service between the station and the airport (Aeroexpress). After the reconstruction of the available industrial tracks and construction of new ones, trains are expected to go at speeds of about 120 kilometers per hour, which will allow passengers to travel from the station to the airport in 25 minutes. A new transit rail and bus station is currently constructed in the city for the upcoming Universiade, and the old railway station, apart from being the Aeroexpresses terminal, will only be used to accept the local formation and commuter trains.

== Trains ==
This is a list of trains that pass the station:

- Moscow — Kazan
- Yekaterinburg — Moscow
- Nizhny Novgorod — Kazan
- St.Petersburg — Kazan
- Novosibirsk — Adler
- Adler — Kazan
- Brest — Kazan
- Gomel — Kazan
- Minsk — Kazan
- Anapa — Kazan
- Astrakhan — Kazan
- Bishkek — Kazan
- Novorossiysk — Kazan
- Almaty — Kazan
- Novy Urengoy — Kazan
- Samara — Kazan
- Tashkent — Kazan
- Kislovodsk — Kazan
- Adler — Barnaul
- Anapa — Izhevsk
- Nizhny Novgorod — Izhevsk
- Kirov — Kislovodsk
- Kirov — Samara
- Kislovodsk — Yekaterinburg
- Moscow — Krugloye Pole
- Moscow — Neryungri
- Moscow — Nizhnevartovsk
- Volgograd — Nizhnevartovsk
- Moscow — Tommot
- Moscow — Ulan-Ude
- Moscow — Yekaterinburg
- Moscow — Vladivostok

== Criticism ==
Kazan station reconstruction for 2013 Universiade, most platforms raised to 1,100 mm (43.3 in), which result the restriction of long-distance trains. Under the newest GOST standard, passenger platforms for the other than DC EMUs, must be either 200 mm (7.9 in) or 550 mm (21.7 in), not 1,100 mm (43.3 in), for increase flexibility.

== Gallery ==
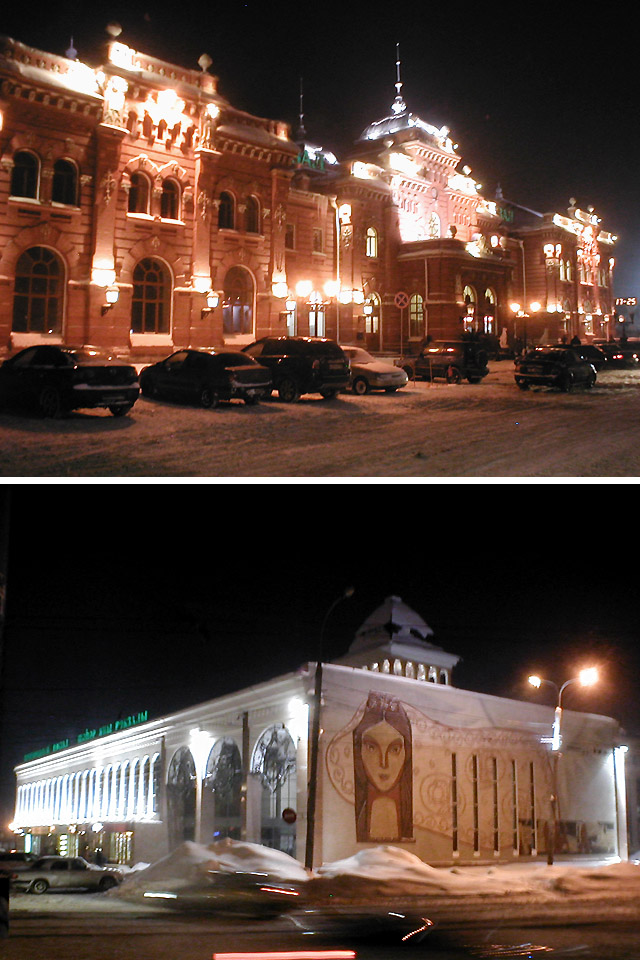
Station at night

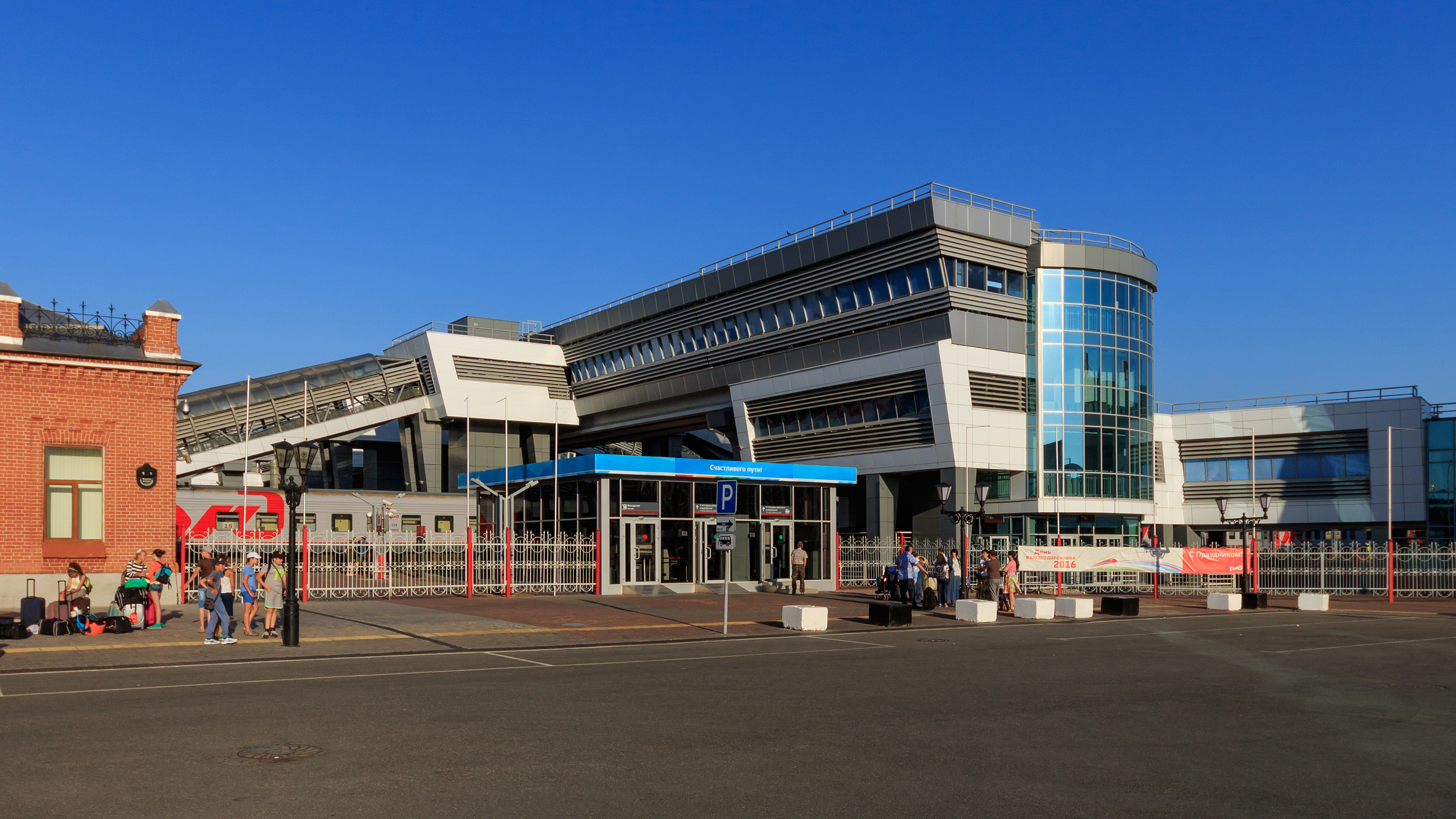
New building facade

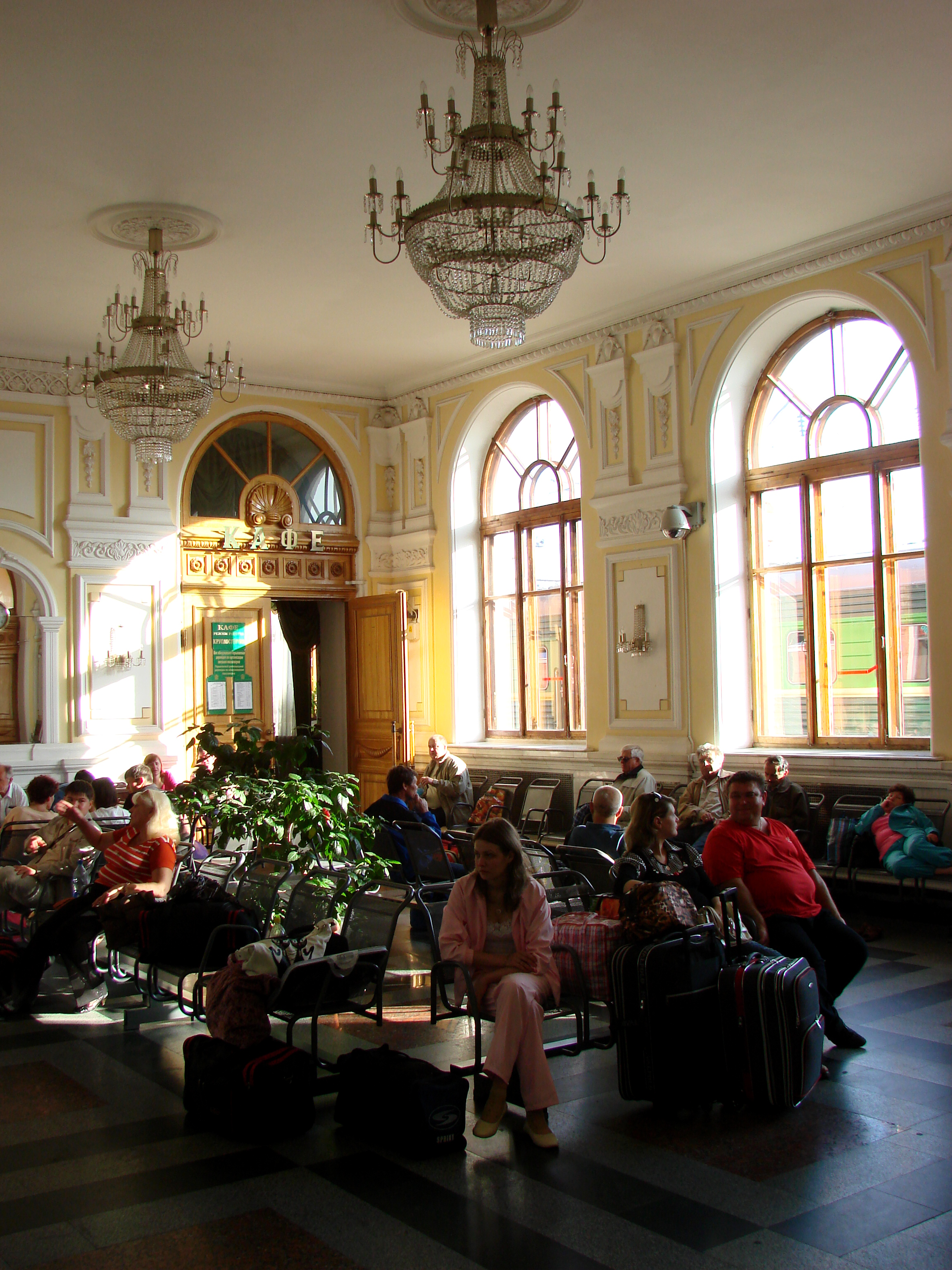
Main building hall

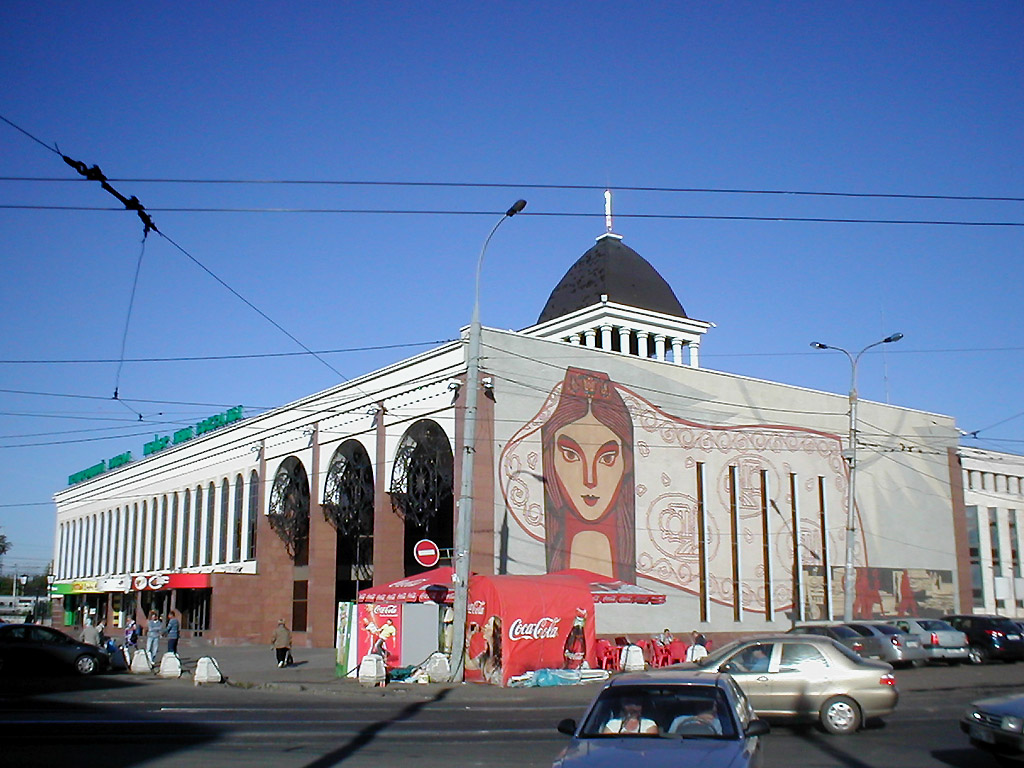
Suburban terminal building

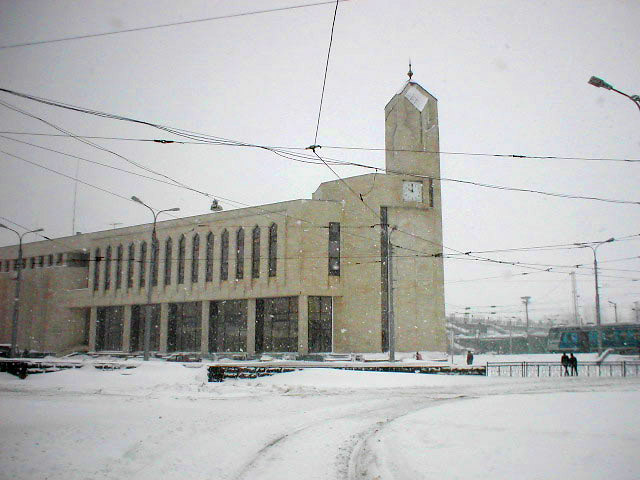
Service building with tickets boxes

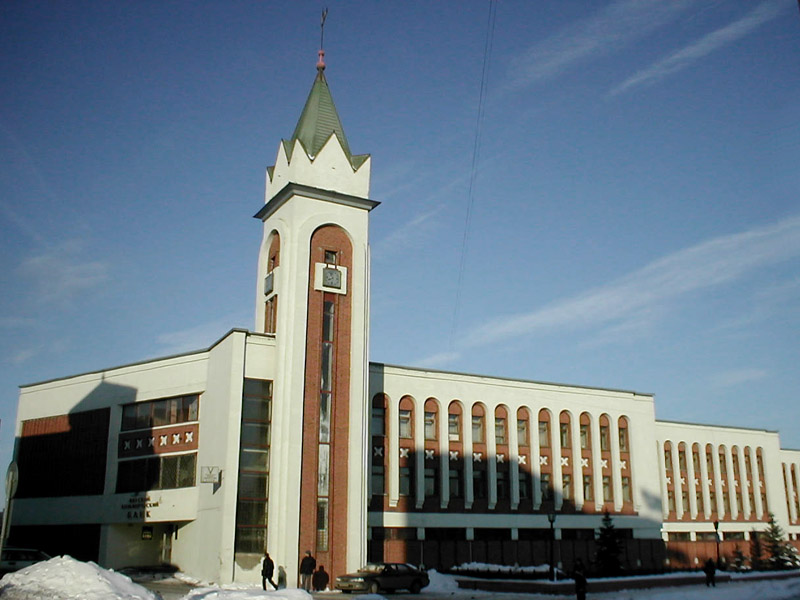
Administrative building

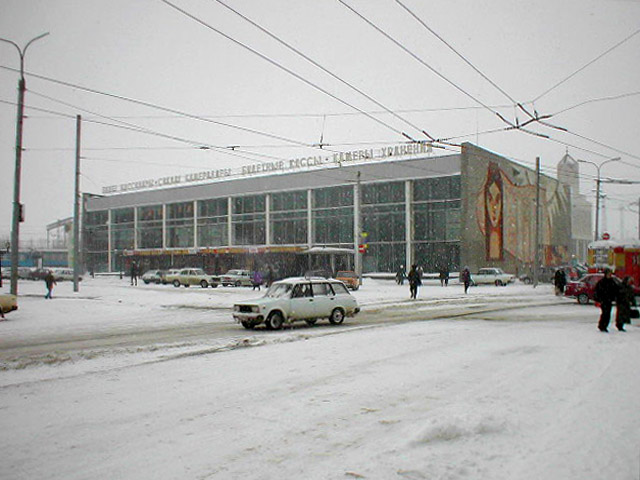
Suburban terminal before reconstruction

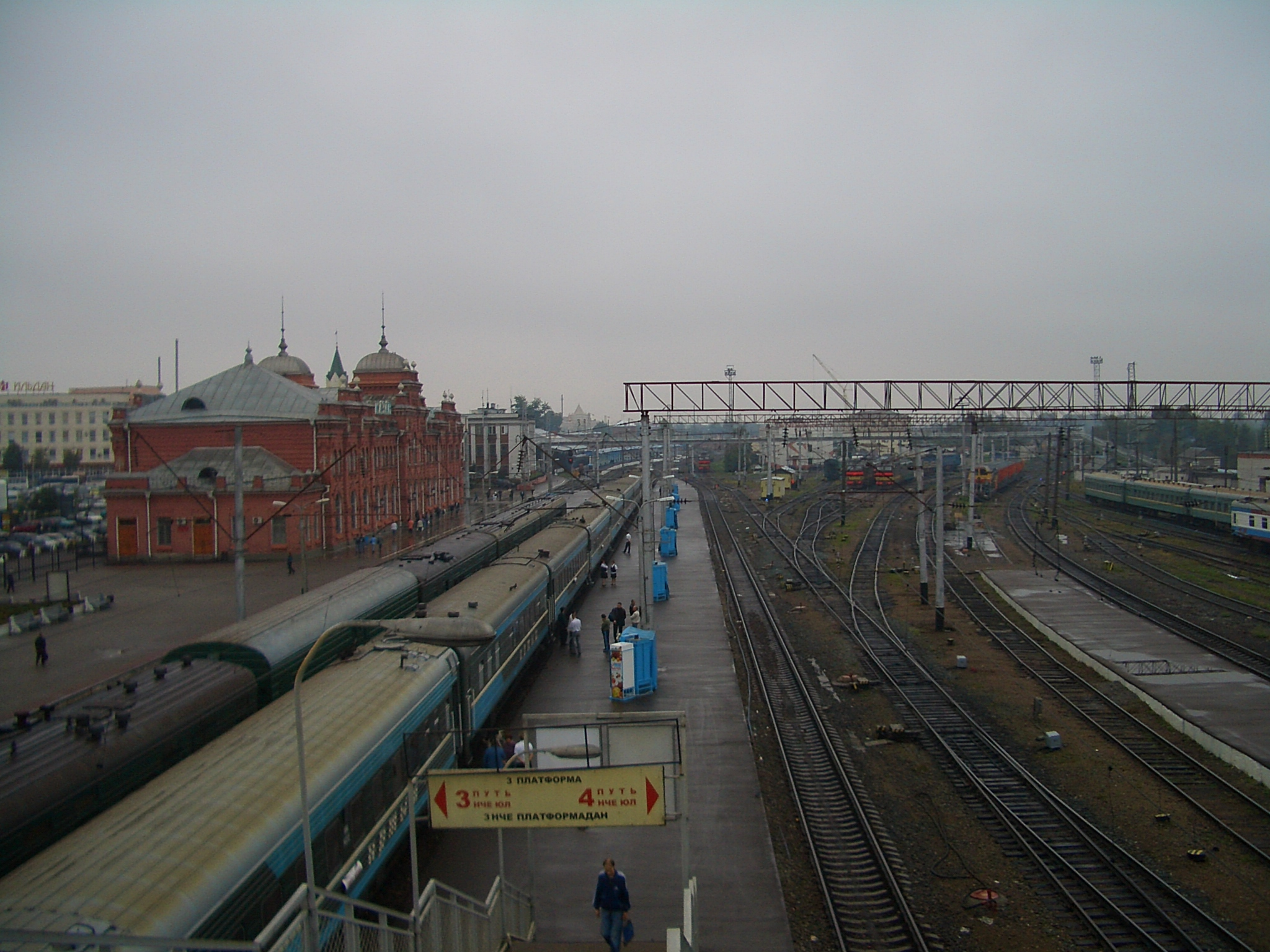
Platforms

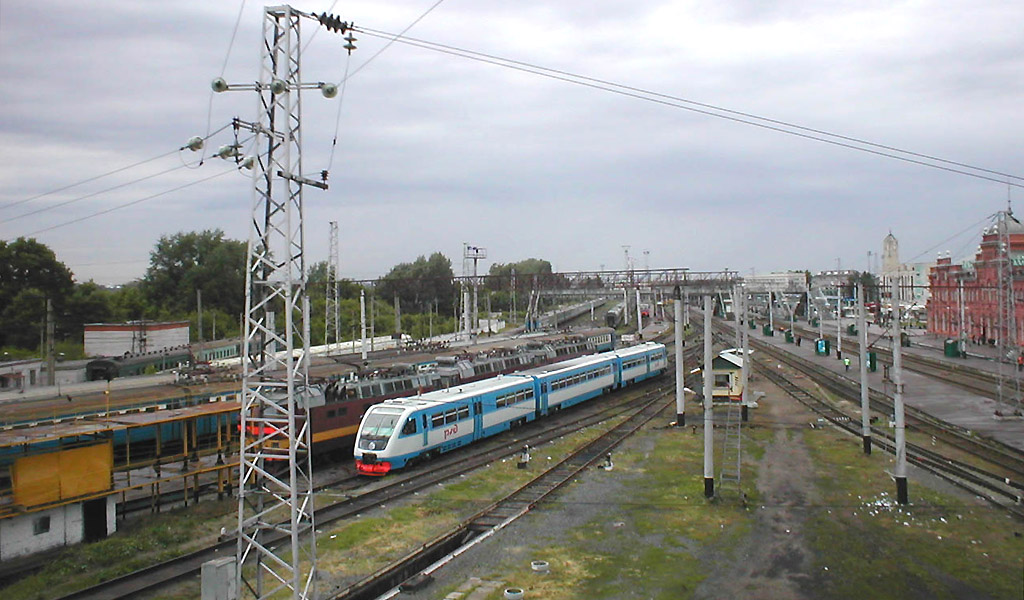
Tracks

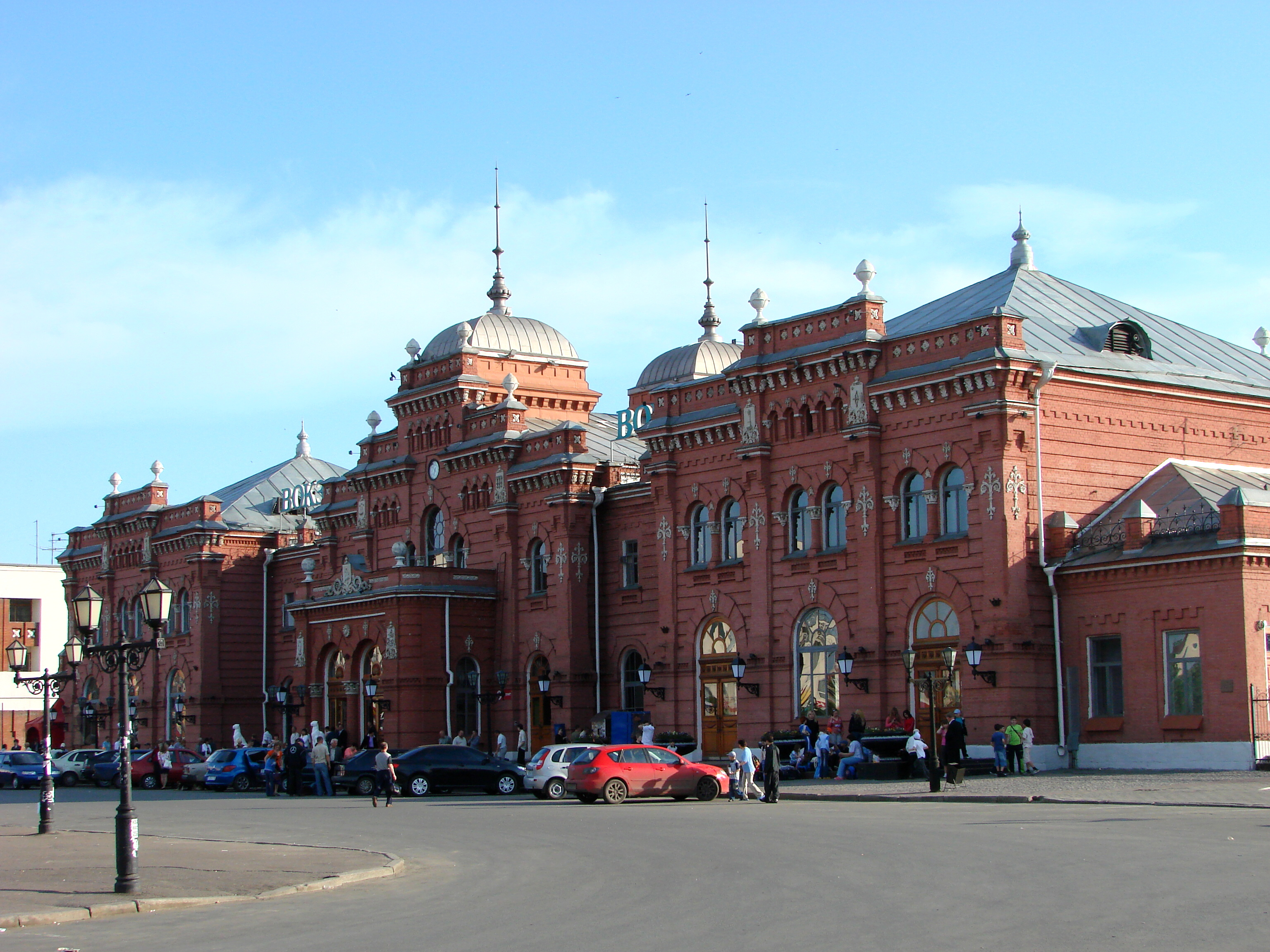
Taxi ground before the main building

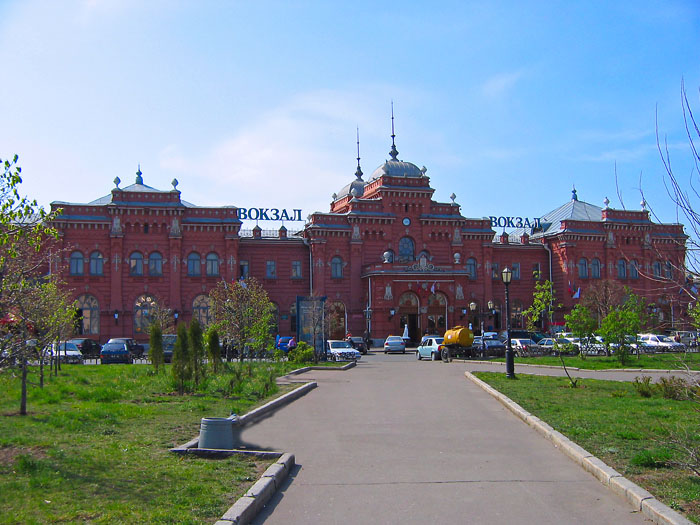
Green area on the square

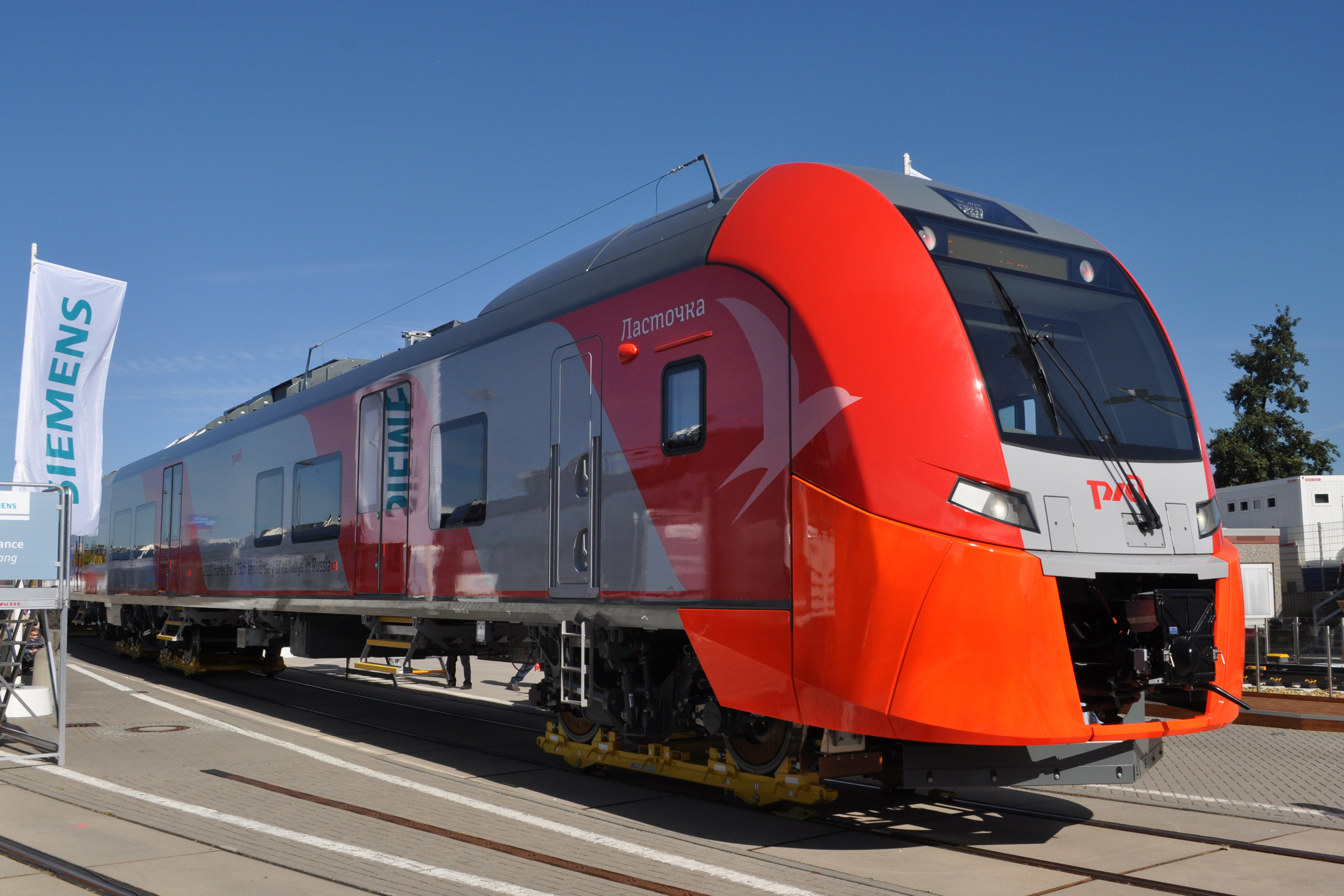
Lastochka express train in Kazan
