= Kazakhstan Temir Joly =

State-owned railway company in Kazakhstan

JSC Qazaqstan Temır Joly (QTJ) Қазақстан Темір Жолы (КТЖ) Казахстанские Железные Дороги (КЖД)

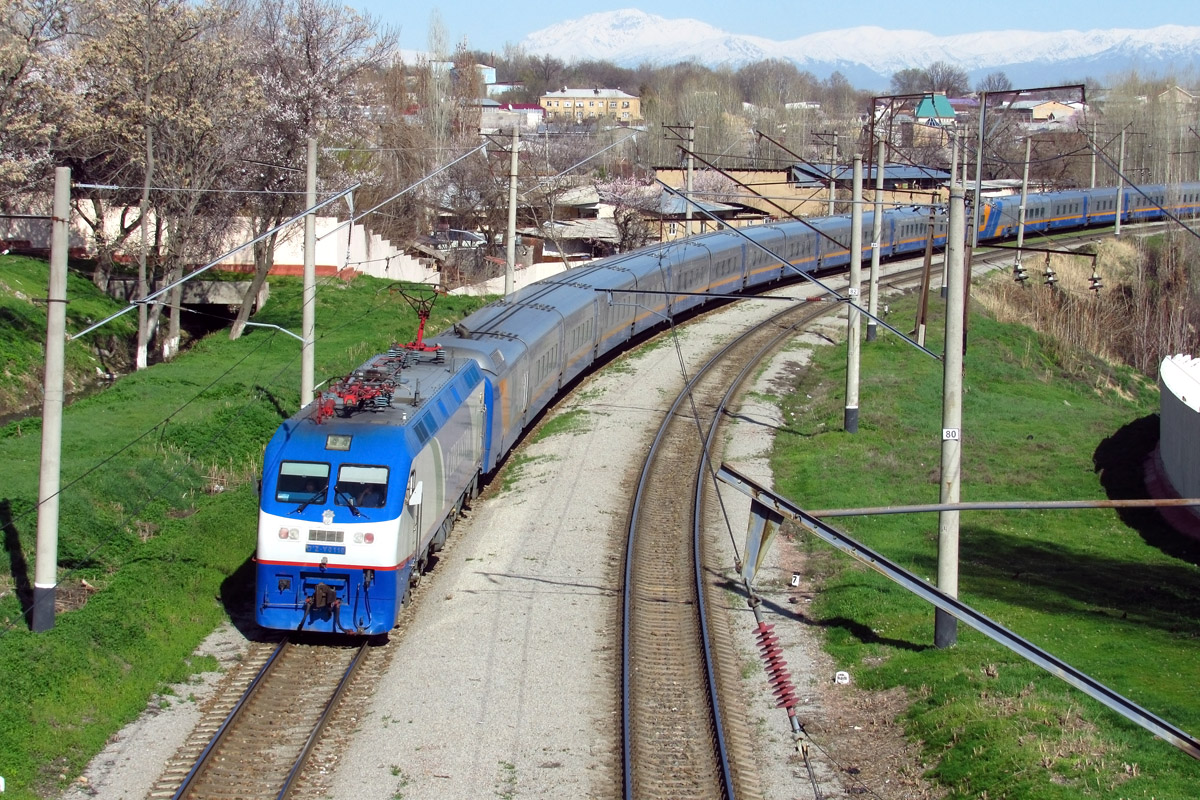
- Type: Joint-stock company
- Industry: Rail transport
- Predecessor: Almaty, Tselinnaya, and West Kazakhstan Railways; Soviet Railways
- Founded: 1997; 29 years ago
- Headquarters: Astana, Kazakhstan
- Area served: Kazakhstan
- Key people: Nurlan Sauranbayev (Chairman of the Management Board)
- Services: Passenger trains, Rail transport, Cargo
- Owner: Samruk-Kazyna (100%)
- Website: railways.kz

Qazaqstan Temır Joly (QTJ; Kazakh: Қазақстан Темір Жолы, IPA: [qɑzɑqˈstɑn tʲeˈmɘr ʒoˈɫɤ]) is Kazakhstan's state-owned railway company founded in 1997, both owning and managing all infrastructure and operating freight and passenger train services and has a near-monopoly on long-distance train travel in Kazakhstan.

KTZ is the largest employer in Kazakhstan with 119,071 employees (2020). Approximately 1% of the Kazakh population are employed by the railroads and affiliated companies. It manages 46,800 freight wagons, 1,700 locomotives and 2,300 passenger cars. The company is profitable and its 2020 revenue was 1,173.3 billion Kazakhstani tenge. In 2020, the freight industry saw increases in overall tonnage of 3.5% versus the previous year, while passenger volume decreased by 54.5%.

== History ==
Following the collapse of the Soviet Union, three state-operated railway administrations (Almaty, Tselinnaya, and West Kazakhstan) were formed. All three railways were previously divisions of Soviet Railways. By 1996, the three railways were in an extremely poor condition, financially and operationally. The vast majority of locomotives and rolling stock were aging, whilst maintenance and effiecientcy were declining.

In 1997 the railways were combined into KTZ as a republican state enterprise. In 2002, KTZ was reformed as a joint stock company, whilst staying under state ownership. In 2008, KTZ was transferred to the state owned sovereign wealth fund, Samruk-Kazyna.

=== The TransKazakhstanTrunk Railways project ===
The potential of Kazakhstan to act as a transit in the trade between China, Europe, and even the eastern coast of America, as envisioned in the Trans-Asian Railway proposal, has not yet been fulfilled. Current rail transport between China and Europe as part of the Eurasian Land Bridge goes over the Trans-Siberian Railway, is lengthy, and requires bogie exchanges.

KTZ is engaging on a major railroad project to link China and Southeast Asia to Europe for a length of 3,900 kilometres (2,400 mi). Currently the plan is to run the railway through Turkmenistan to Iran; Iran is linked to Turkey and Europe's standard gauge system In May 2013, a new rail link opened between Uzen (Kazakhstan) and Serhetyaka (Turkmenistan), crossing the border at Bolashak. The railway is 146 km long and cost 65bn tenge. The railway is Russian gauge; there would be a break of gauge when the railway reaches the Iranian border.

Construction for the new line will start at the eastern border town of Druzhba to go to Aktau on the Caspian Sea. Construction is expected to start in 2006 and take four years. The total cost of the project is $5–7 billion. A link from Aktau to Iran is also required.

The transport corridor through Kazakhstan has the potential to provide a railway-ship link between China and the east coast of North America through the Northern East West corridor.

== Infrastructure ==
JSC Qazaqstan Temır Joly (QTJ) Қазақстан Темір Жолы (КТЖ)
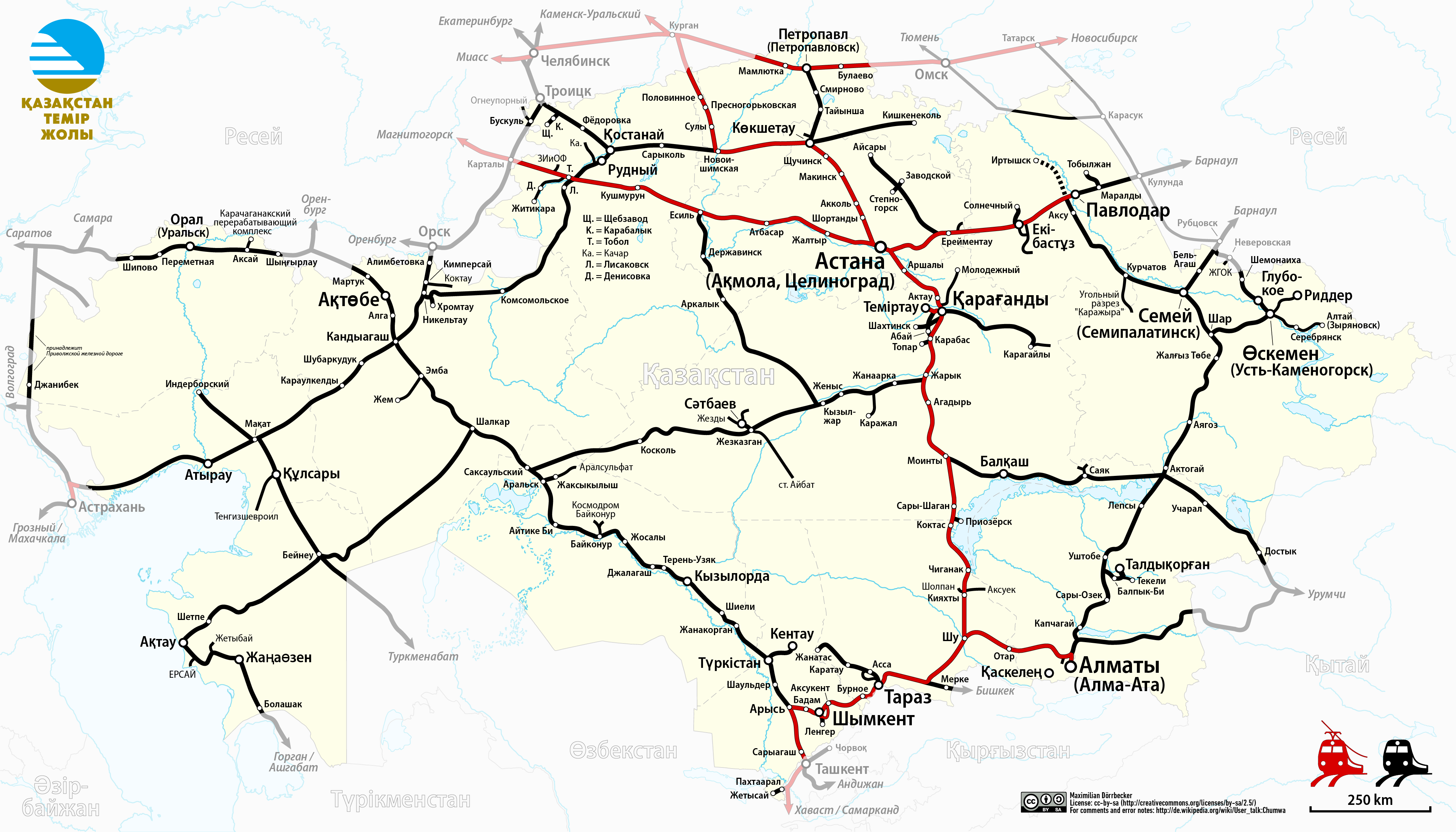

Overview
- Headquarters: Astana
- Reporting mark: КТЖ, KTZ, QTJ
- Locale: Kazakhstan
- Dates of operation: 1997–present
- Predecessor: Soviet Railways

Technical
- Track gauge: 1,520 mm (4 ft 11 27/32 in)
- Electrification: 25 kV AC
- Length: 15,000 km (9,300 mi)

Other
- Website: railway.kz

=== Network ===
The current rail network is based on the inheritance from the former Soviet Union and as such has a broad gauge of 1,520 mm (4 ft 11 27/32 in). While this provides a smooth transit at international borders to countries of the former Soviet Union, the railway in China has the standard gauge of 1,435 mm (4 ft 8 1/2 in); thus there is a break-of-gauge at Dostyk and at Khorgas/Altynkol.

KTZ controls about 16,400 km (10,200 mi) track (2005) which is being expanded. The Kazakhstan sections of the old Trans-Aral Railway, the Trans-Caspian railway, and the Turkestan-Siberia Railway have been incorporated into the KTZ. 4,000 km (2,500 mi) are electrified at 25 kV 50 Hz AC.

=== Railway links with adjacent countries ===
- Russia – same gauge (former Soviet Union railway system)
- China – break of gauge 1,520 mm (4 ft 11 27/32 in)/1,435 mm (4 ft 8 1/2 in); border stations at Druzhba (connecting to Alashankou on the Lanxin railway) and at Korgas.
- Kyrgyzstan – same gauge (former Soviet Union railway system)
- Uzbekistan – same gauge (former Soviet Union railway system)
- Turkmenistan – same gauge (former Soviet Union railway system) – new rail link opened in 2013.

=== Rolling stock ===
In October 2010, Kazakhstan Temir Zholy ordered 295 KZ8A electric locomotives from Alstom, for both freight and passenger services. On October 3, the first train of this order was delivered during an official ceremony. While the first 10 pre-series of KZ8A locomotives are being manufactured at Alstom’s Belfort facility, the remaining will be built in Astana, in the new Alstom plant in Kazakhstan which will be inaugurated on December 12, 2012. Besides, on October 8, 2012, KTZ signed its first maintenance contract with Alstom for the full maintenance, major overhaul and modernization of 27 passenger locomotives KZ4AC for a period of 25 years.

In November 2010, KTZ awarded Talgo a contract to replace its fleet of 3000 intercity vehicles. After the delivery of some of these vehicles, it was announced in October 2019 that this order had been cancelled.

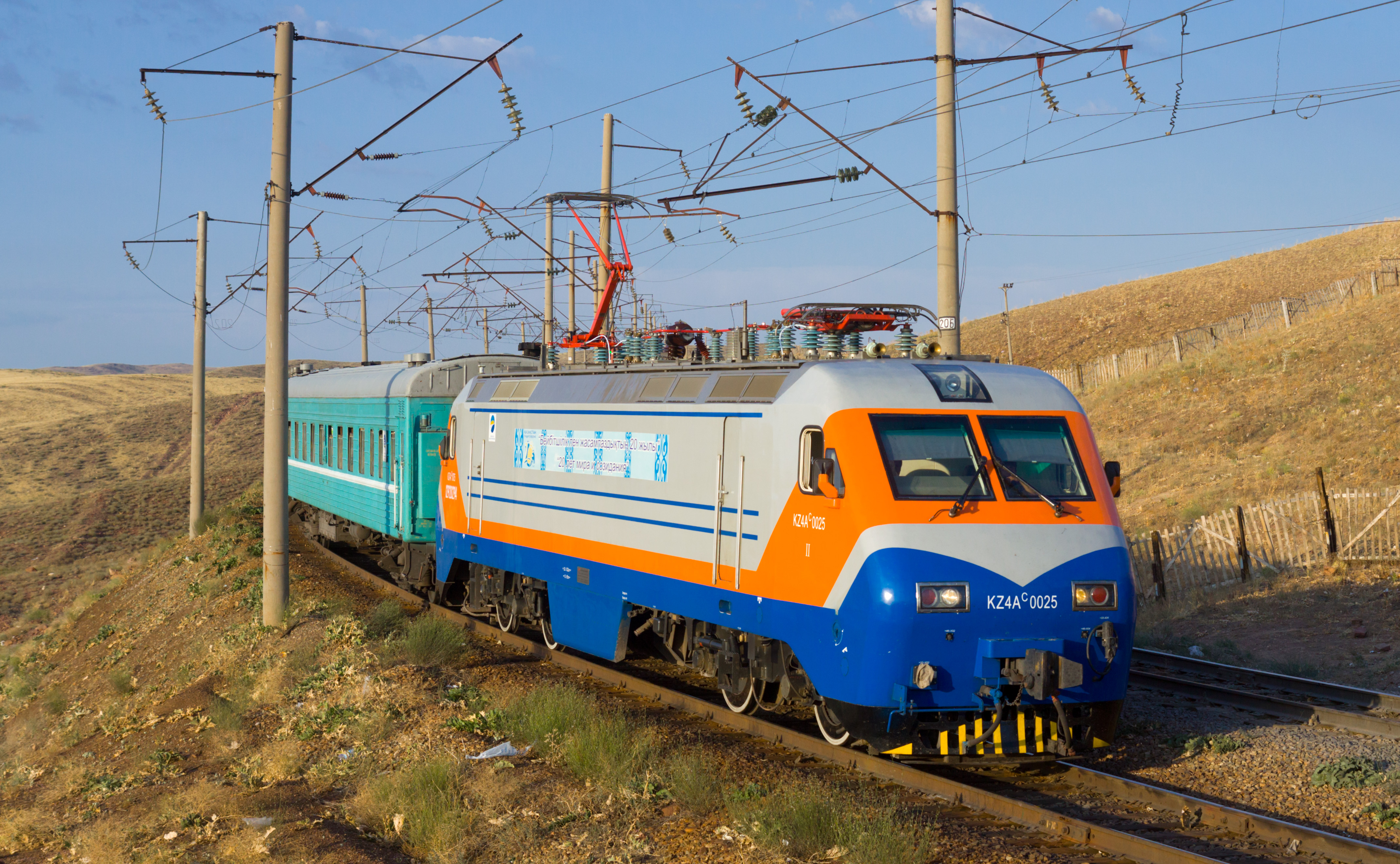
KZ4A

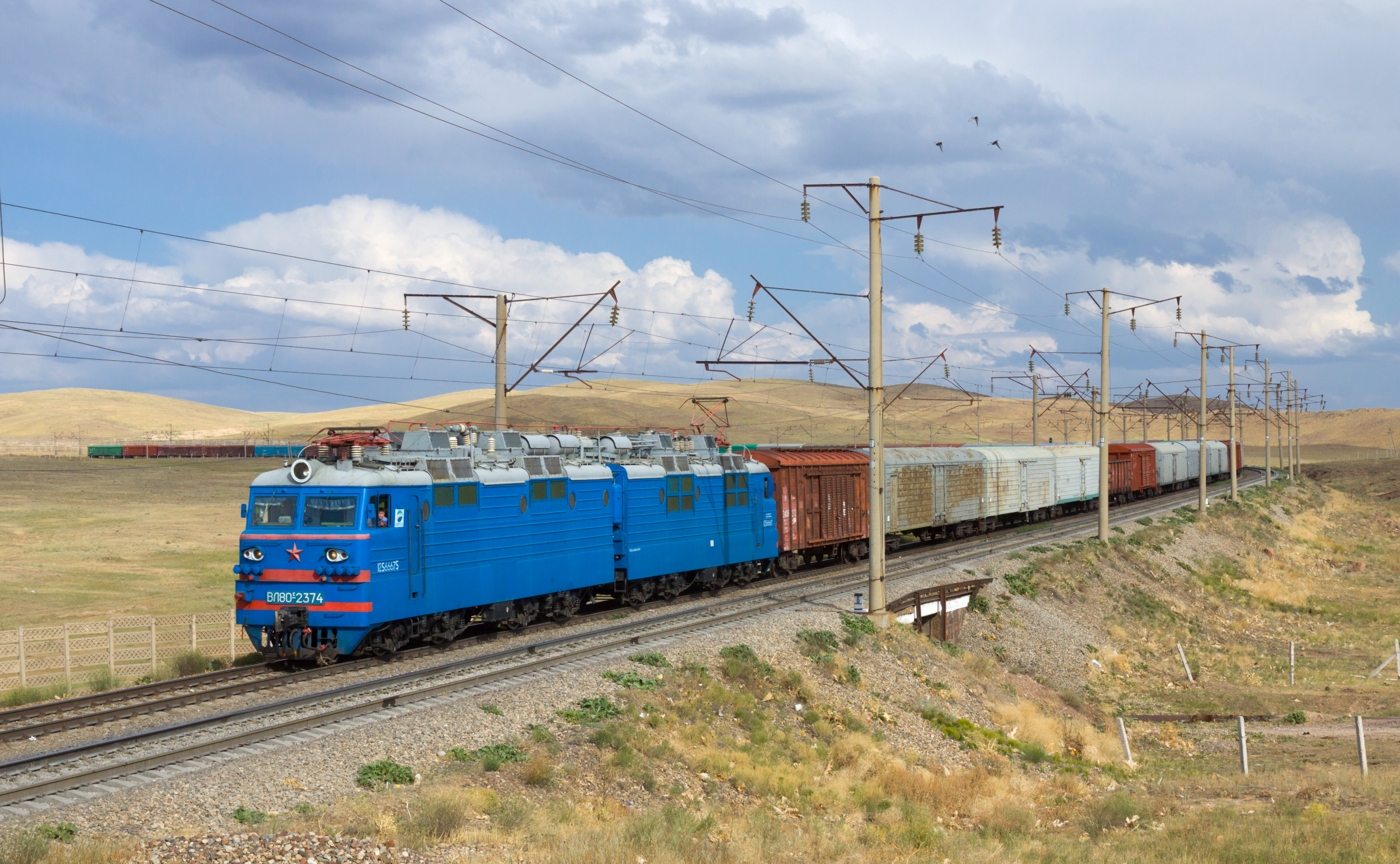
VL80

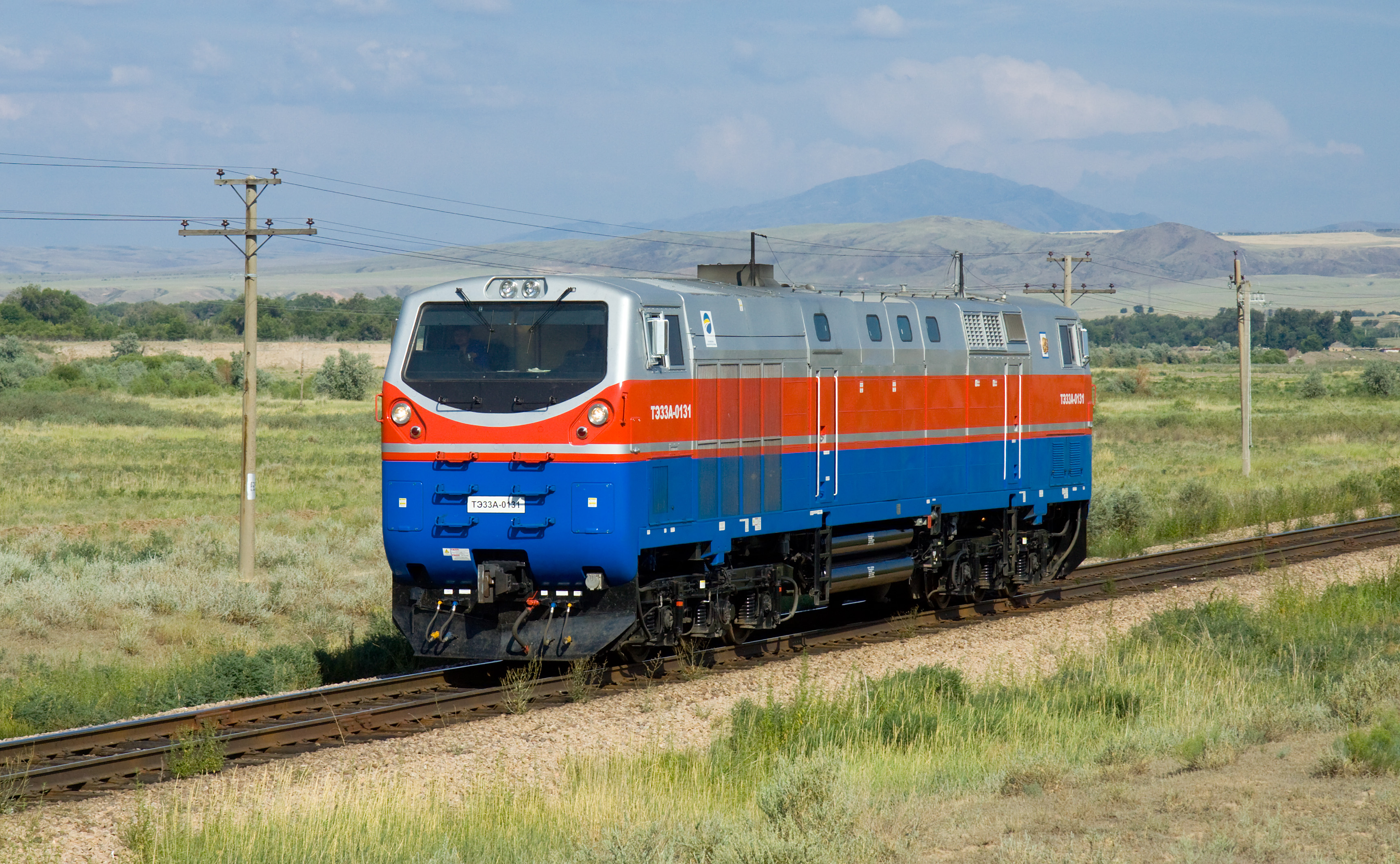
TE33A "GE Evolution"

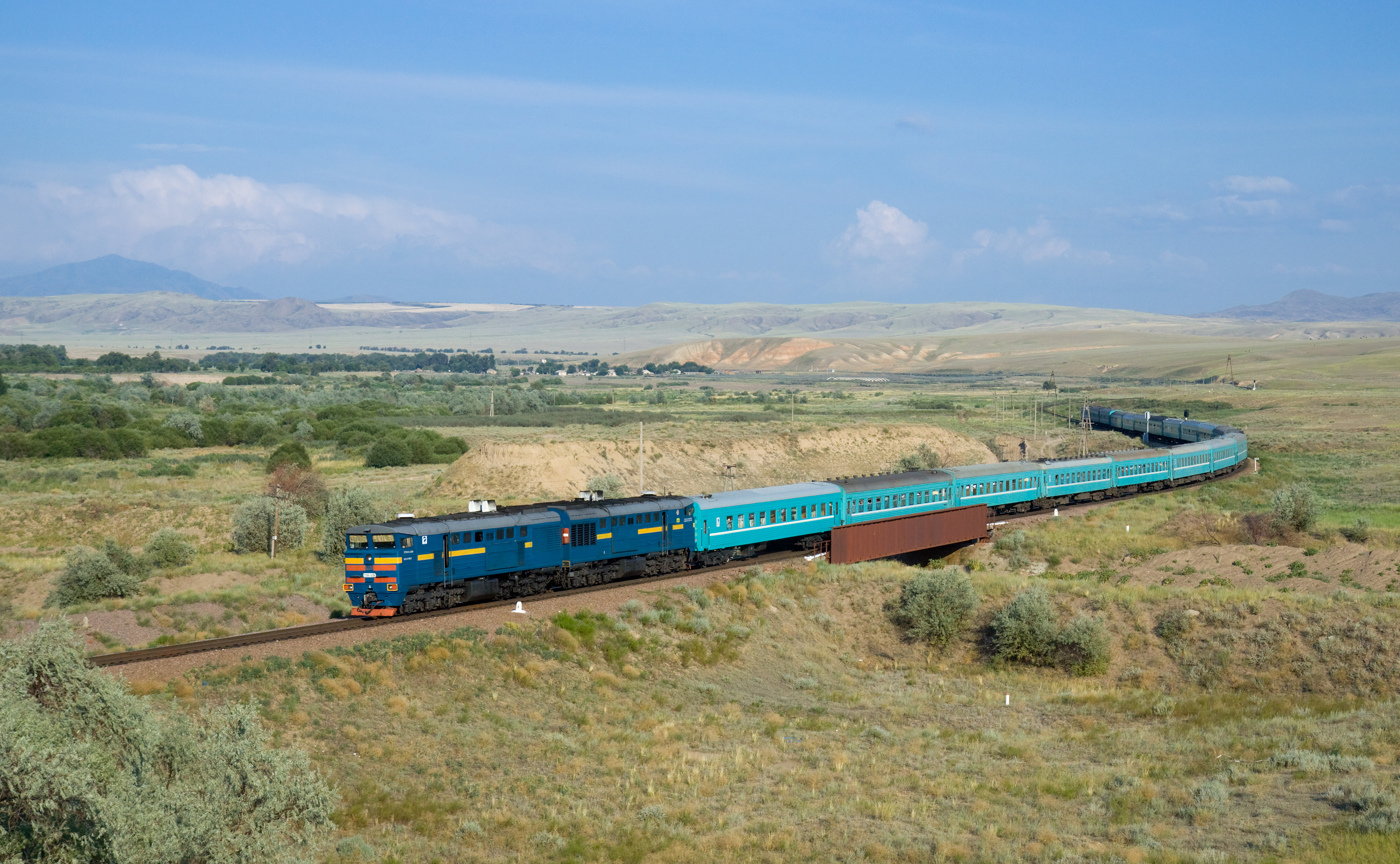
2TE10U with train 22 Kyzylorda – Semey

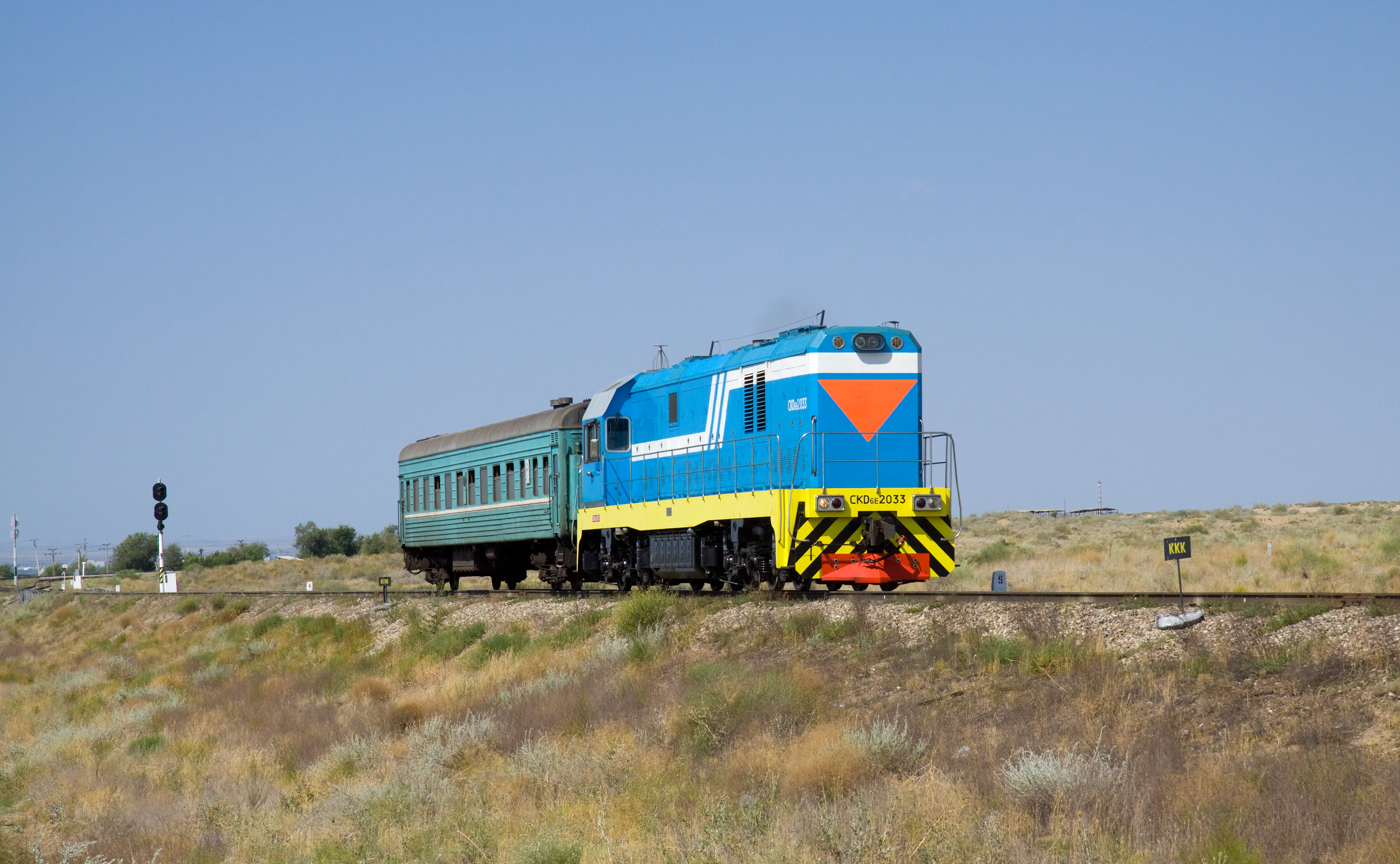
CKD6E

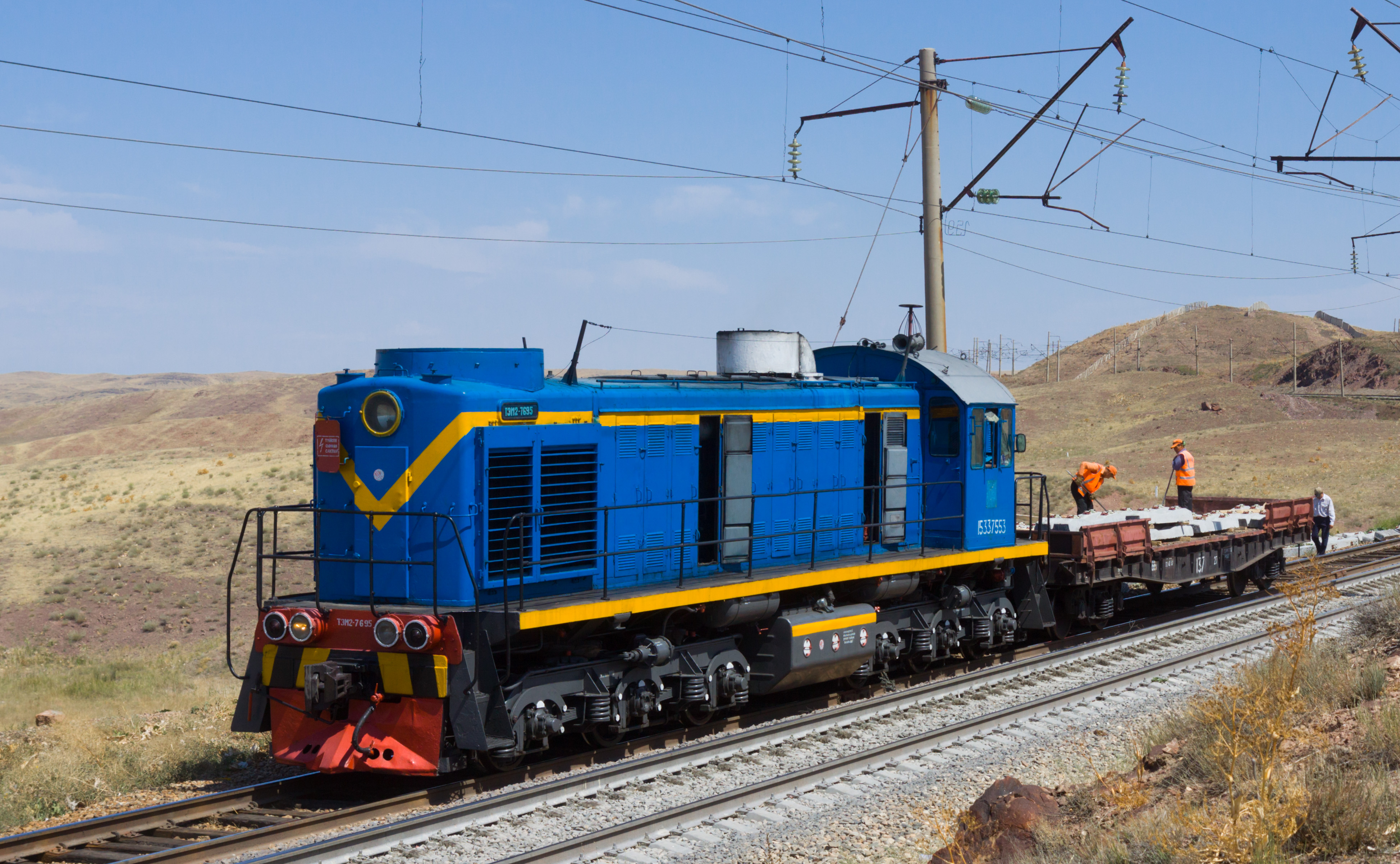
TEM2 "Tamara"

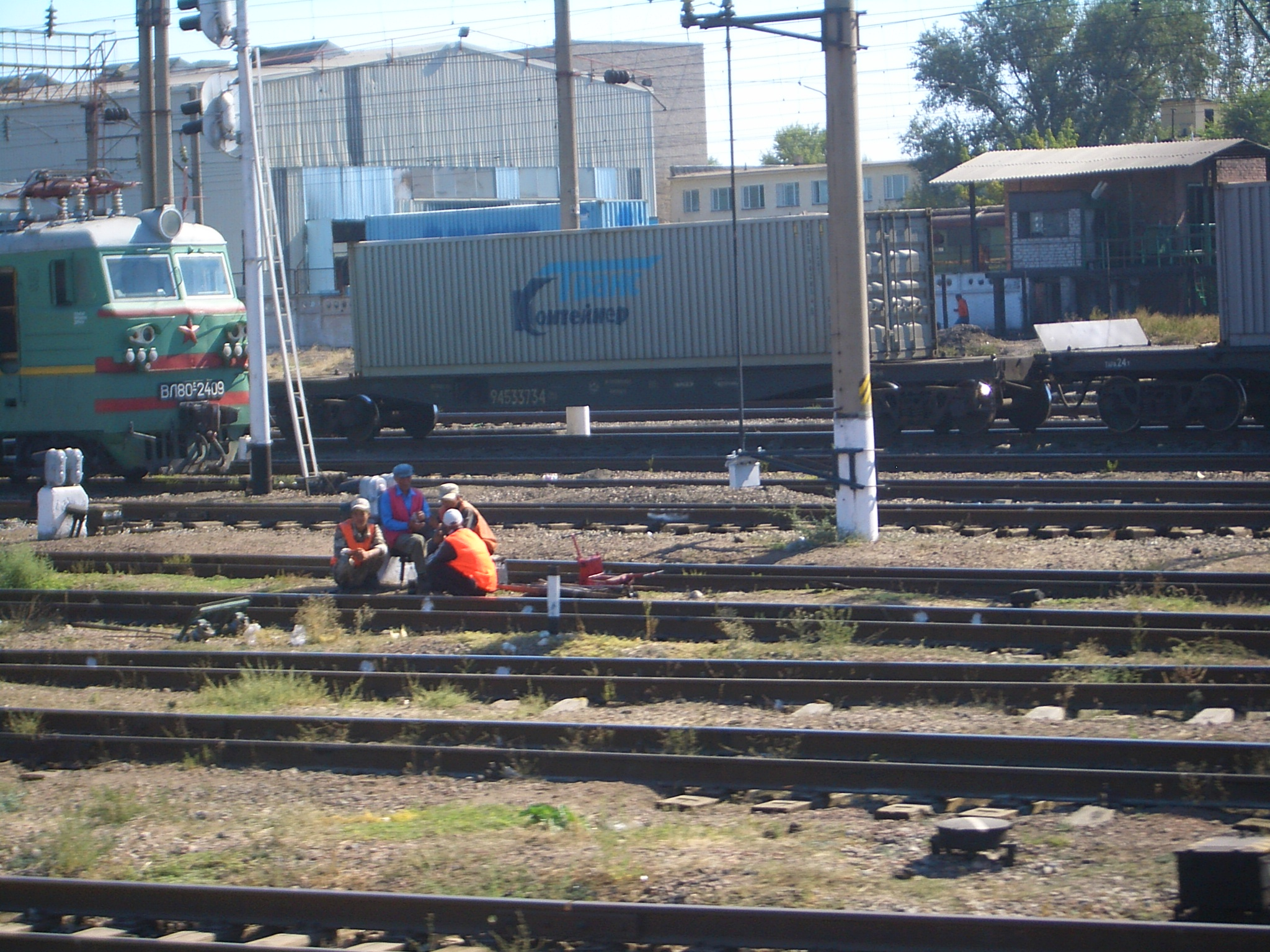
At the Shu Junction

=== Infrastructure investment initiatives ===
Temir Zholy is a principal implementer of Kazakhstan’s New Silk Road Initiative and Nurly Zhol new economic policy.

=== Khorgos-Eastern Gate ===
The FEZ "Khorgos-Eastern Gate" is a logistics center for the distribution of cargo flows on the New Silk Road near Nurkent and Khorgos, and further integrates Kazakhstan into the global transport and trade system, particularly between China and the European Union.

=== High-speed railway project ===
In the early 2010s, a project for building a high-speed railway between Astana and Almaty was actively discussed by the Kazakh and Chinese officials. However, in 2013 the project was postponed due to high cost.

=== Logistics ===
Kazakhstan Temir Joly & AD Ports Group (ADX: ADPORTS) signed a joint venture agreement in December 2023 to improve rail connectivity, maritime shipping services, the growth of operations in Kazakhstan's ports, and to speed up digital transformation and connectivity in Central Asia.

== See also ==
- Narrow gauge railways in Kazakhstan
- Transport in Kazakhstan
- Tengri Unitrade CARGO
- North-South Transport Corridor
- Ashgabat Agreement, a Multimodal transport agreement signed by India, Oman, Iran, Turkmenistan, Uzbekistan and Kazakhstan, for creating an international transport and transit corridor facilitating transportation of goods between Central Asia and the Persian Gulf.
