= Zhakiya Kazhi Mosque =

Mosque in Kokshetau, Kazakhstan

- Жақия қажы мешіті
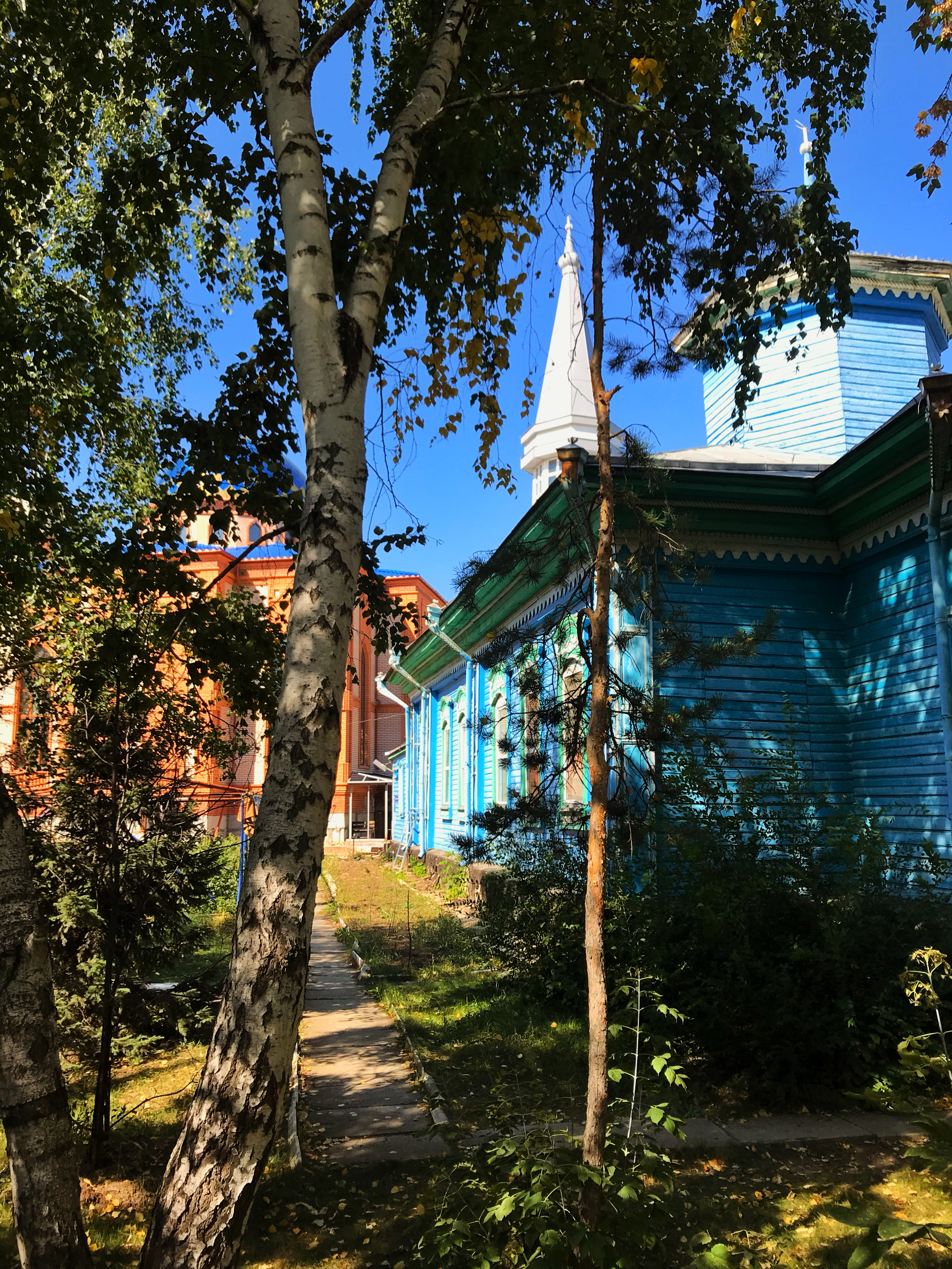

- Location within Kazakhstan

Religion
- Affiliation: Islam
- Branch/tradition: Hanafi

Location
- Location: Kokshetau, Akmola Region
- Country: Kazakhstan
- Interactive map of Zhakiya Kazhi Mosque
- Administration: Spiritual Association of Muslims of Kazakhstan
- Coordinates: 53.283°N 69.37871°E

Architecture
- Type: mosque
- Groundbreaking: 1893
- Completed: 1893—1894

Specifications
- Minaret: 1
- Materials: wood

Website
- nasihat.kz

The Zhakiya Kazhi Mosque (Kazakh: «Жақия қажы» мешіті, romanized: «Jaqııa qajy» meşiti; Russian: Мечеть «Жакия Кажы», romanized: Mechet' «Zhakiya Kazhy») is a mosque in the center of Kokshetau, the capital of Akmola Region, in the northern part of Kazakhstan.

It is the oldest Juma mosque in the city, built by the Tatars and the city's population's donations between 1893 and 1894 (located on the 91, Auelbekova St.; at the end of the 19th century it was called Kazanskaya). It is an architectural monument of local importance.

== Design and construction ==
The mosque characterizes the type of Tatar mosques with a temple and a minaret united by one volume. The walls are made of logs with the remainder, sheathed with boards. Rectangular in plan volume under a hip roof with a quadruple of a mihrab on the western facade and an understated volume of a canopy stretched along the longitudinal axis under a hip roof in the east.

Above the roof there are: on the eastern edge - a two-tier minaret, an octagon on a quadrangle under a hipped dome, on the western edge - a flat dome on a hexagonal drum. The facades are characteristic of the eclectic period, a mixture of classical forms and elements of wooden architecture. The beams are sheathed under paneled pilasters. The tops and bottom of the arch windows are decorated with floral patterns of an applied sawing thread. Stepped cornices are decorated with rope and wavy rods. Inside there is a longitudinal-axial composition of the plan with a mihrab niche in the center of the western wall of the hall, separated by a partition from the entrance.

== History ==
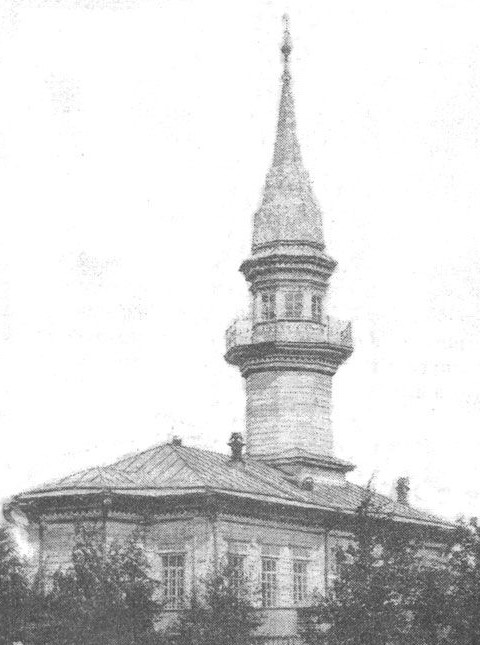
Kokshetau central mosque. 1912

In the "Information about educational institutions located in the Akmola region" for 1887, there is information about the school of the Kokchetav mullah Nauryzbay Talasov, which at his house "exists at the request of the parents of students, the charter and regulations since 1886, expenses (from the treasury) are not made. " (TsGA RK, f. 359, p. 1, d.10, b. 2)

As for the opening in Kokchetav madrasah - the exact date of this event is unknown, but on the city plan 1893 at the corner of Bolshaya Sadovaya (named after Abay) and Malaya Sadovaya (named after S. Seifullin) streets there is a mosque building and "with her a school and premises for students."

The history of the city mosque named after Nauan Khazret (now Zhakiya Kazhy), located on Auelbekov Street, has more than a hundred years. It began at the end of the 19th century. Street "Auelbekova" at the end of the 19th century was called "Kazanskaya", probably because it was populated mainly by Tatars who came from Kazan.

Many of them were engaged in trade. It was at the expense of the wealthy Tatar merchants that the new mosque was built, although all the Muslims of the city made their own contribution to this good cause. The builders were invited from Kazan, but the city craftsmen took part in the construction of the building.

The writer Ibragim Salakhov, a native of the city Kokshetau, who himself was a master of carpentry, said that one of them was his father Nizam, a well-known craftsman in the city who built in Kokshetau more than one house decorated with wooden lace. Until the 1920s, the muezzin called the faithful to prayer from the minaret of the white, carved mosque from the minaret of the white mosque, and then it suffered the fate of most of the religious buildings of the country of the Soviets.

The mosque was deprived of the minaret, rebuilt and turned into an ordinary building, which in different years was used for the needs of the city. In 1941 - 1945 in the former mosque there were formed military units, from 1947 to 1974 - the Regional Museum of History and Local Lore, then - the art workshops of the drama theater, in 1975 - branch gallery of the Republican Art Exhibition Hall.

Almost seventy years later, in 1989, in accordance with the decision of the Kokshetau regional executive committee, the mosque was returned to the believers of the city. Today the building of the mosque is a monument of the historical and cultural heritage of the city Kokshetau and is under State protection.

== Imams ==
In the 1980s, imam-khatib in the Kokchetav mosque was appointed Zhakiya Beisenbaev (Beisembayev).

== See also ==
- Nauan Hazrat Mosque
- Islam in Kazakhstan
- List of mosques in Kazakhstan
- List of mosques in Europe
- List of mosques in Asia
