= List of mosques in Kazakhstan =

This is a list of mosques in Kazakhstan.

Name	Images	Location	Year/century	Remarks
Astana Grand Mosque		Astana	2022	
Central Mosque Almaty		Almaty	1999	
Hazrat Sultan Mosque		Astana	2012	
Manjali Mosque		Atyrau	2001	
Nauan Hazrat Mosque		Kokshetau	2015	
Mashkhur Jusup Mosque		Pavlodar	2001	
Mausoleum of Khoja Ahmed Yasavi		Hazrat-e Turkestan	1389–1405	
Nur-Astana Mosque		Astana	2008	

== See also ==
- Islam in Kazakhstan
- Lists of mosques
