= Nauan Hazrat Mosque =

Mosque in Kokshetau, Kazakhstan

- «Nauan Haziret» meşiti
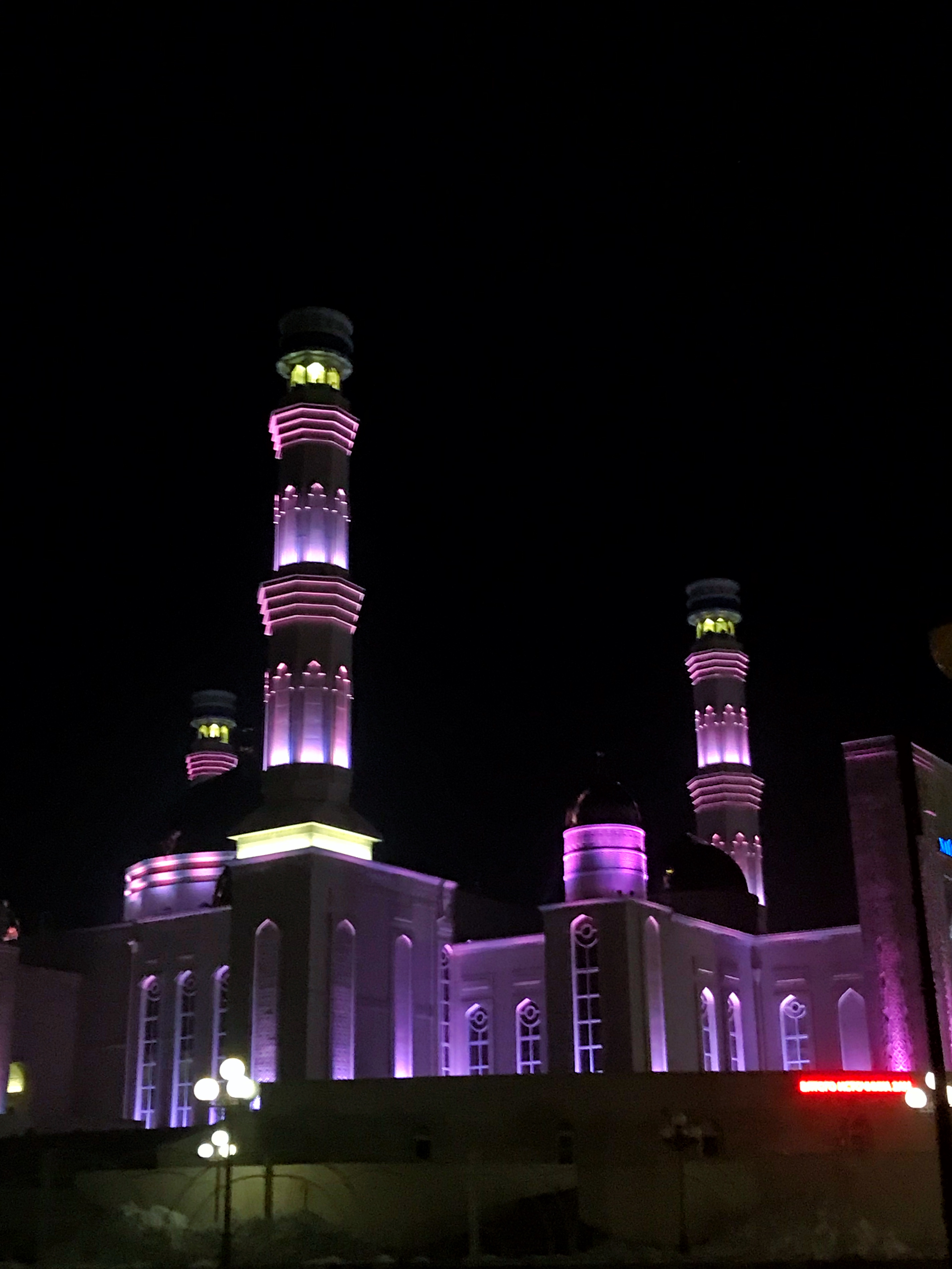

- Location of the mosque in Kazakhstan

Religion
- Affiliation: Sunni Islam
- Rite: Hanafi
- Leadership: Sabit Kuanysh
- Status: Active

Location
- Location: Kokshetau, Akmola Region, Kazakhstan
- Administration: Spiritual Association of Muslims of Kazakhstan
- Coordinates: 53.2941°N 69.3832°E

Architecture
- Type: Mosque
- Style: Islamic
- Funded by: The city's population's donations
- Groundbreaking: 2010
- Completed: September 16, 2015
- Construction cost: 1,428,387,000

Specifications
- Capacity: 1,200 — 1,400 worshipers
- Domes: 1 main, 6 semi-domes
- Dome height (outer): 25-metre (82 ft)
- Dome dia. (outer): 12
- Minaret: 4
- Minaret height: 45.5-metre (149 ft)
- Site area: Built-up: 5,138 m^{2} (55,300 sq ft); Total: 15,279 m^{2} (164,460 sq ft)
- Materials: Concrete, granite and marble

Website
- nasihat.kz

The Nauan Hazrat Mosque (Kazakh: «Науан Хазірет» мешіті, romanized: «Nauan Haziret» meşiti; Russian: Мечеть «Науан Хазрет», romanized: Mechet' «Nauan Khazret») is a mosque in the center of Kokshetau, the capital of Akmola Region, in the northern part of Kazakhstan. Built between 2010 and 2015 by the city's population's donations, its minarets 45.5 metres (149 ft) in height and the dome is 25 metres (82 ft) high.

The mosque opened for public use on 16 September 2015. The area of the mosque is 5,138 m^{2} (55,300 sq ft) which allows a capacity of 1,200 — 1,400 worshipers. Worshippers are separated by gender during a worship service; females worship on the second floor (balcony), while the males worship on the first floor.

== History ==
The mosque is one of the largest in Kokshetau. The mosque is named after Nauryzbay Talasov (1843–1916), known as a theologian who preached Muslim morality and as an unyielding fighter for the rights of Kazakhs in tsarist Russia.

== Design and construction ==
The construction of the mosque started in March 2010. On September 16, the mosque was officially opened, which supplemented the list of unique objects of the city. During the construction of the mosque, the latest and modern technologies have been used.

The total area of mosque and its surrounding land is 15,279 m^{2} (164,460 sq ft). The size of the mosque itself covers 5,138 m^{2} (55,300 sq ft). The mosque design is based on a classical Islamic style with traditional Kazakh ornaments. The central hall of the mosque is covered with a huge dome (diameter — 12 m [39 ft], height — 25 m [82 ft]). The height of the four minarets is 45.5 m (149 ft) making them one of the highest minarets in Akmola Region. The Exterior and interior walls of the mosque are made of aglay, travertine, while the interior is decorated in white marble. There are in total 45 chandeliers.

== See also ==
- Islam in Kazakhstan
- List of mosques in Kazakhstan
- List of mosques in Europe
- List of mosques in Asia
