= Hazrat Sultan (disambiguation) =

Hazrat Sultan is one of the epithets of Sufi sheikh Khoja Ahmed Yasavi, author of "Divan-i Hikmet", whose mausoleum is located in Turkistan.

Hazrat Sultan may also refer to:

- Hazrat Sultan Mosque
- Hazrat Sultan International Airport
