= Mashkhur-Zhusup Kopeev =

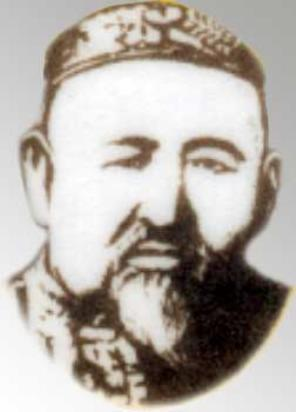
- Born: 1858; Bayanaul District
- Died: 1931 (aged 72–73); Bayanaul, Kazakh ASSR

Mashkhur-Zhusup Kopeev (1858 –1931) was a Kazakh poet, philosopher, historian, ethnographer, orientalist and collector of oral folklore of the Kazakh people.

== Early biography ==
Mashkhur-Zhusup Kopeev was born in 1858 in the territory of the modern Bayanaul District, Kyzyltau, which then was inside Siberian Governorate-General. He belonged to the Kulik sub-clan (Kazakh: Күлік) of the Suyndyk clan of the Argyn tribe of the Middle Zhuz. He began his education at a village school. At 7-8 years old, Zhusup already showed his interest in rewriting the fairy-tales, such as "Suyunduk: Olzhabay Batyr", which he heard from Sakyn-aqyn. In 1870, he studied at the Bukhara madrasa of Hazrat Kamara, becoming on of his three students. Under his mentorship, Zhusup delved into Kazakh epics, such as "Kozy Korpesh - Bayan Sulu", "Er Targyn", "Tort Zhigittin Oleni" and many more, which he recorded as well. There epics became popular on public stage. After the madrasa, he traveled through Northern and Central Kazakhstan, where he collected more diverse oral folk art and familiarized himself with the lifestyle of the clans and tribes inhabiting those areas. In 1872, Kopeev was enrolled in the Kukeldash madrasah in Bukhara. After graduating in 1875, he worked as a teacher in a village for several years. Alongside teaching, he was actively engaged in journalistic work, publishing in the newspaper "Dala Ualayaty" ("Kyrgyz Steppe Newspaper"), the magazine "Aykap", and publishing houses in Kazan. His knowledge and talent earned him great popularity and respect among the people, and as a result, he received the honorary title "Mashhur," which in Arabic means "famous, renowned, worthy."

Between 1887 and 1890, he conducted ethnographic expeditions to Samarkand, Bukhara, Tashkent, Turkestan, and other cities of Central Asia. His acquaintance with the Russian Turkologist and ethnographer Vasily Radlov influenced Mashhur Zhusup's interest in collecting Kazakh folklore. Throughout these expeditions, he learned to fluently speak Russian, Arabic, Farsi, Old Turkic, which helped him gather and publish many samples of Kazakh oral folk art. All of these oral folklores, poems and quotes, which were recorded by Kopeyev, are considered as his legacy.

== Literary works ==
In 1906–1907 in Kazan, collections of Mashhur Zhusup's poems titled "Experience Accumulated by Life," "Situation," and the book "To Whom Does Saryarka Belong," written in prose and verse, were published by the Khusainov publishing house. In these works, the author expresses his negative attitude towards the resettlement policy of tsarism, the seizure of fertile lands for immigrants, and social inequality. Later, the tsarist censorship deemed these books harmful, almost the entire print run was confiscated, and the author was listed as politically unreliable, forcing him to hide temporarily in Tashkent. Notable poems include "Paying Tribute to Science," "On the Current Occupation of the Kazakhs," " I Searched for a Life Partner Everywhere," "Letter," and "To Mother."

Following the traditions of oral creativity, he wrote dastans (epic poems) such as "Trade of Devils," "The Hawk and the Nightingale," "The Old Man and Two Young Men," among others. His good grasp of Arabic and Persian allowed Mashhur Zhusup to deeply study Eastern poetry and also create dastans inspired by Eastern motifs, including "Gulshat-Sherizat," "Gibrat-nama," "Bayan-nama," and others.

He also recorded oral works from folk storytellers such as Bukhara Zhyrau, Kotesha, Shortanbay, Shozhe, as well as poems by Abai and S. Toraygyrov. These materials became valuable sources for folklorists, historians, and literary scholars.

== Preservation of Kazakh history ==
Mashkhur-Zhusup played significant role in preserving the Kazakh historical facts and biography about khanate in his manuscript "The roots of Kazakhs". Other historians especially highlight Kopelev's significance in adding information about Tauke khan. He always indicated the sources he used, provided detailed information about the performers, their repertoires. Additionally, Kopeyev carefully kept records of shezhire (genealogies lineage), such as "The Lineage of the Middle zhuz"," the Lineage of the Khans", The Lineage of the Naiman ","The Lineage of the Kanzhygaly" and "The Lineage of the Kerei".

== Classification of Kopeyev's works ==
The manuscripts of M.Z. Kopeyev:

- translated by him from ancient Hadim writings and copies - 30 volumes;
- the poet's own works - 3 volumes;
- dastans (highly artistic poetic works) - 3 volumes;
- samples of the Akyn competition - 2 volumes;
- translations - 3 volumes;
- works of oral folk art - 3 volumes;
- history, religion, philosophy, ethnography, pedagogy, statements about the Kazakh way of life, etc. - 6 volumes;
- folklore samples - 10 volumes.

It is notable that Zhusup highlighted every new topic with red ink and pencil, making his manuscripts easy to read and understand.

== Repressions by Tsarist Regime ==
Mashkhur-Zhusup Kopeyev was the first among Kazakh writers who bravely critiqued Russian colonization policies with his poems, describing violence and oppression caused. For example, he addressed the first Russian Revolution in 1905 in his work "Andy Zheksenbi" ("Bloody Sunday"). His publications of "To Whom Does Saryarka Belong,"The amazing phenomenon I saw in my long life", "Life" was a turning point - the tsarist regime accused Mashkhur Zhusup of freethinking, and seized all his books published in the same year in one of the printing houses of Kazan, fined 12,000 rubles with the withdrawal of printed publications. Unfortunately, since that time, the works that remained in his manuscripts have not been published anywhere and hidden in the vaults of the National Academy of Sciences of the Republic of Kazakhstan.

Kopeev had to hide from arrest for many years. in Tashkent, Kokand, the Volga region, the Urals. The poem "My Secret Journey" belongs to this period of his life. M. J. Kopeev returned home only in 1915. He was dissatisfied with his era and the society in which he lived. All these feelings were expressed in his poem "Thoughts of the Heart". Mashkhur Zhusup welcomed with joy the February revolution of 1917, which announced the fall of the tsarist regime. He welcomed the innovations that the Soviet government introduced into the life of the Kazakhs.

During the years of Soviet power, Mashkhur Zhusup took an active part in the work of societies and organizations engaged in the study of the material and spiritual culture of the Kazakh people.

== Last years ==
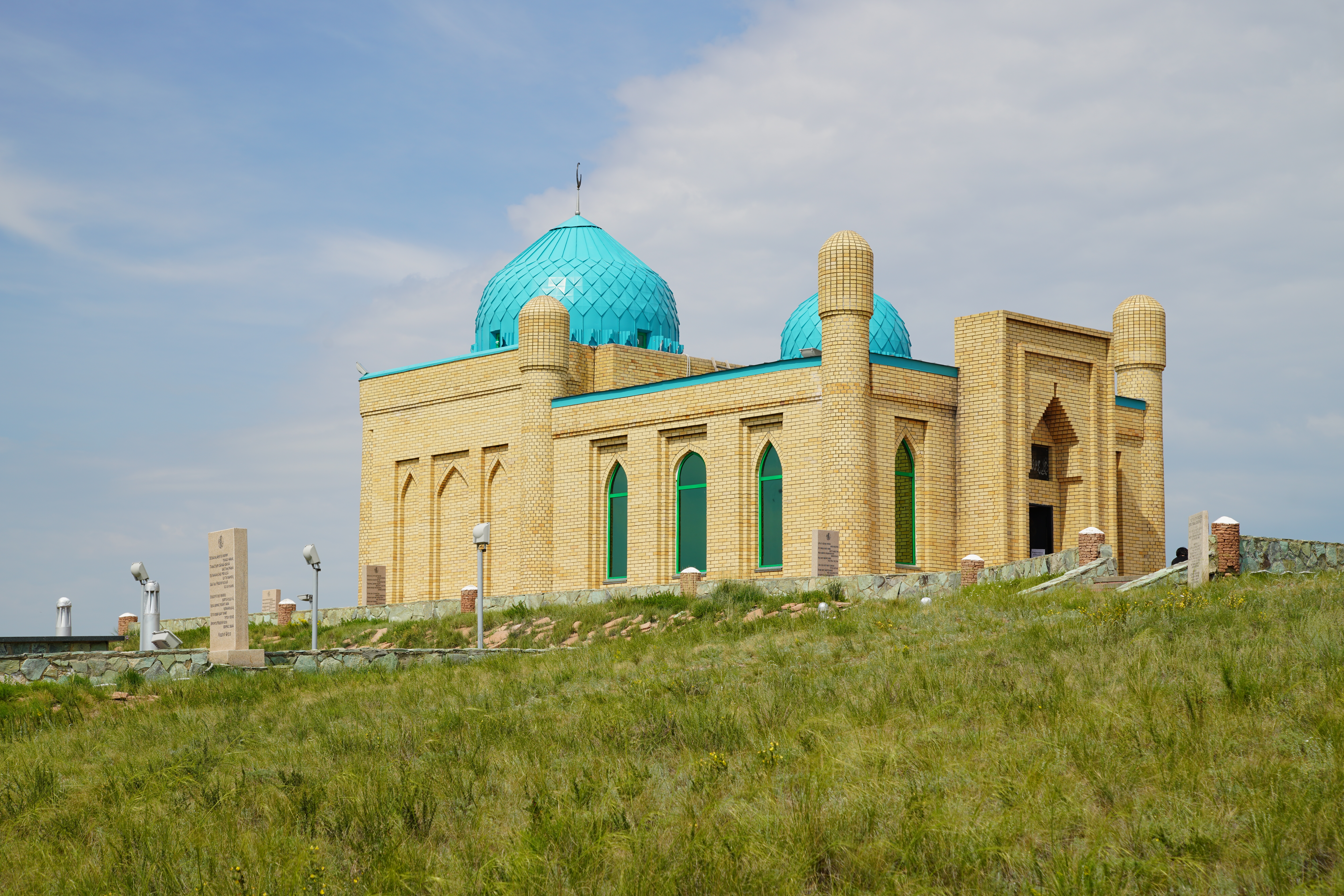
Mashkhur-Zhusup Mausoleum

In 1915, Kopeev returned to the Bayanaul District, where he spent his final years until his death in 1931. Interestingly, in 1930, exactly one year before his death, the poet invited relatives and close friends to a memorial service for himself, announced to them that he would live exactly 73 years. And an extraordinary thing happened: on the predicted day Mashkhur-Zhusup died. Even the stone with his engraved quote was found near burial place - "I won't die until I'm seventy-three." According to his will, his body was buried in a special, pre-prepared grave, but it was not covered with earth or balmed. It is known that the poet's body was in an open grave for more than 30 years without destruction. This mystery caused his grave to become like a shrine, a place of worship. According to folklore, it cures cancer and makes women pregnant.

In 1952, during another campaign against anti-Soviet symbols, one of the party workers proposed destroying Kopeev's grave. The authorities began to convince the people that Kopeev's activities were harmful and ordered the demolition of the mazar. In 1978, by popular demand, the mazar was restored. Later, in 2006, a mausoleum was erected, a religious building that became one of the most significant spiritual and historical monuments of Kazakhstan.

== Memory ==
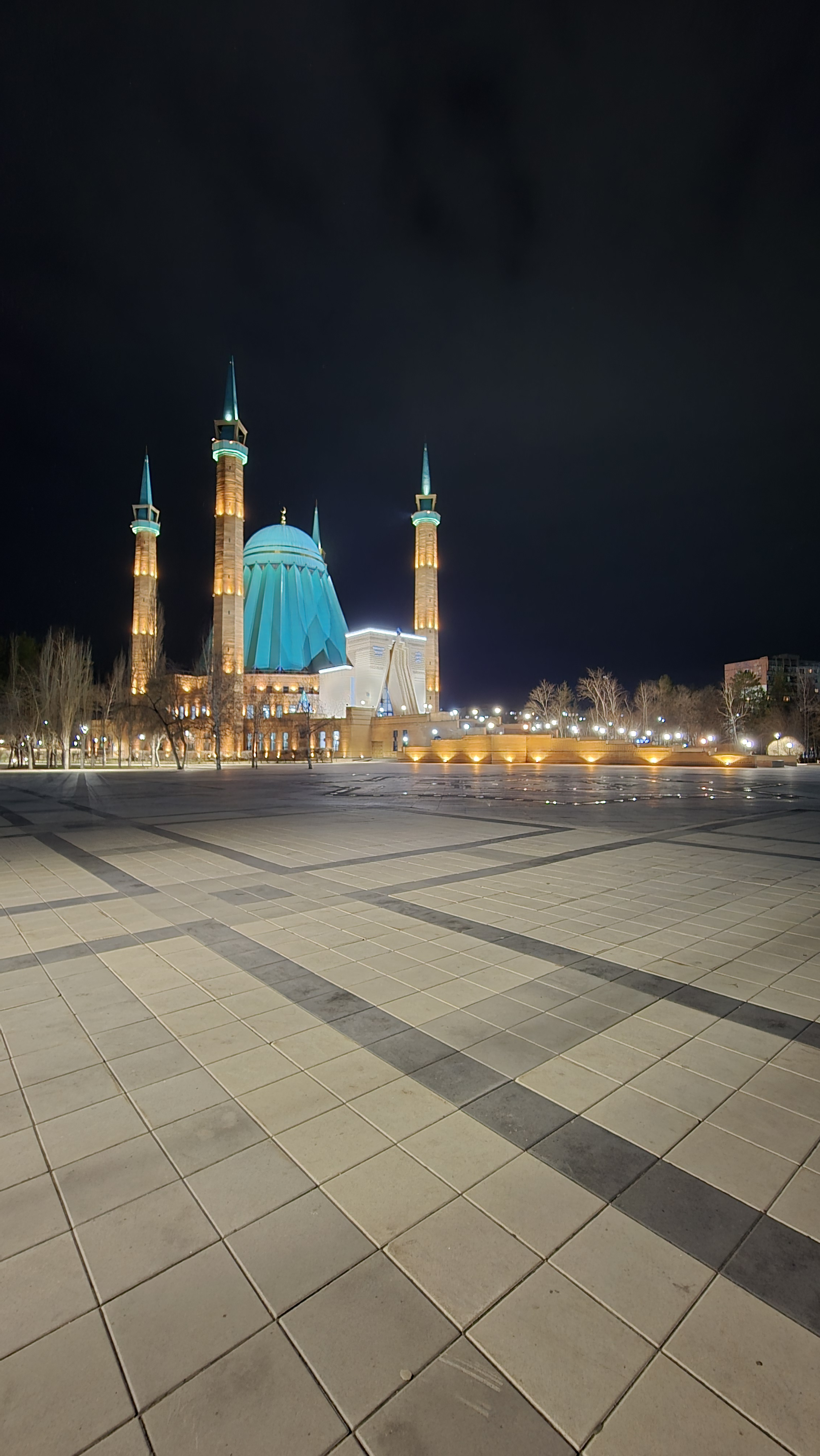
Mashkhur-Zhusup Mosque in Pavlodar

On September 22, 1999, the name of Mashhur Zhusup was given to the Zhanazhol Secondary School in the Bayanaul District of Pavlodar Region. At the S. Toraygyrov Pavlodar State University in 2004, a scientific-practical center for the study of Mashhur Zhusup was opened. In 2019, one of the central streets in Pavlodar, 1 May Street, was renamed Mashkhur-Zhusup Street. In 2020, School Street in the village of Zhetekshi was renamed Mashhur Zhusup Street. The Mashhur Jusup Mosque, located in the center of Pavlodar, Kazakhstan, was completed in 2001 and is one of the largest mosques in the country.
