= Märcani Mosque =

Mosque in Kazan, Tatarstan, Russia

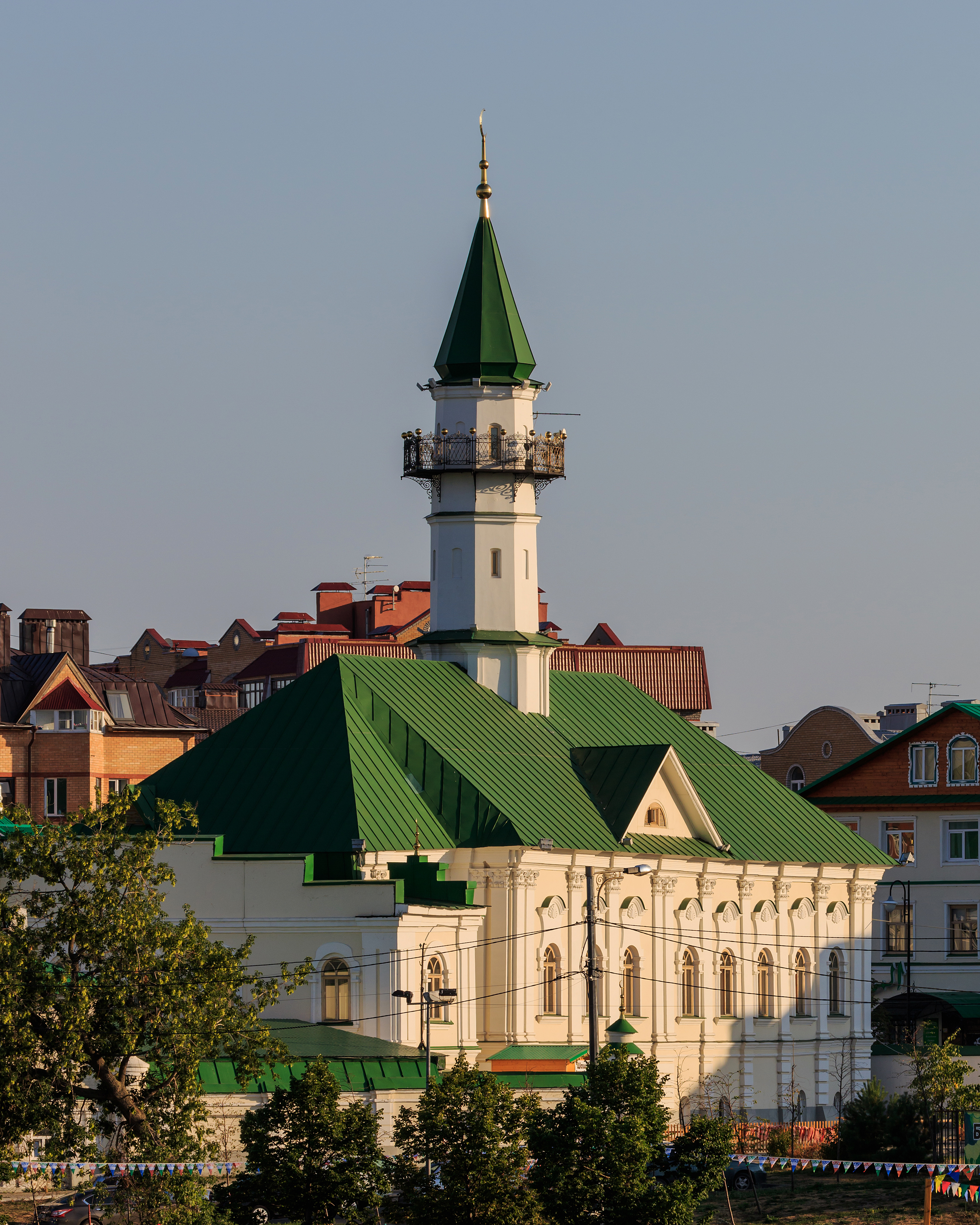
- Märcani Mosque, 2016

Religion
- Affiliation: Islam
- District: Tatarstan
- Status: Active

Location
- Location: Kazan, Russia
- Interactive map of Märcani Mosque
- Coordinates: 55°46′47″N 49°07′03″E

Architecture
- Type: Mosque
- Style: Tatar medieval, Provincial Baroque
- Completed: 1770
- Minaret: 1

Website
- http://mechet-marjani.ru/

The Märcani Mosque (pronounced [mærʑæˈni]; Tatar: (әл-)Мәрҗани мәчете; formerly Äfände, i.e. Seigniorial, The First Cathedral Mosque, The Yunısovs' Mosque), also spelled al-Marjani, Mardjani and Mardzhani (Russian: Мечеть (аль-)Марджани́) is a mosque in Kazan, Russia, built in 1766–1770 by Catherine the Great's authority and on the city's population's donations.

== History ==
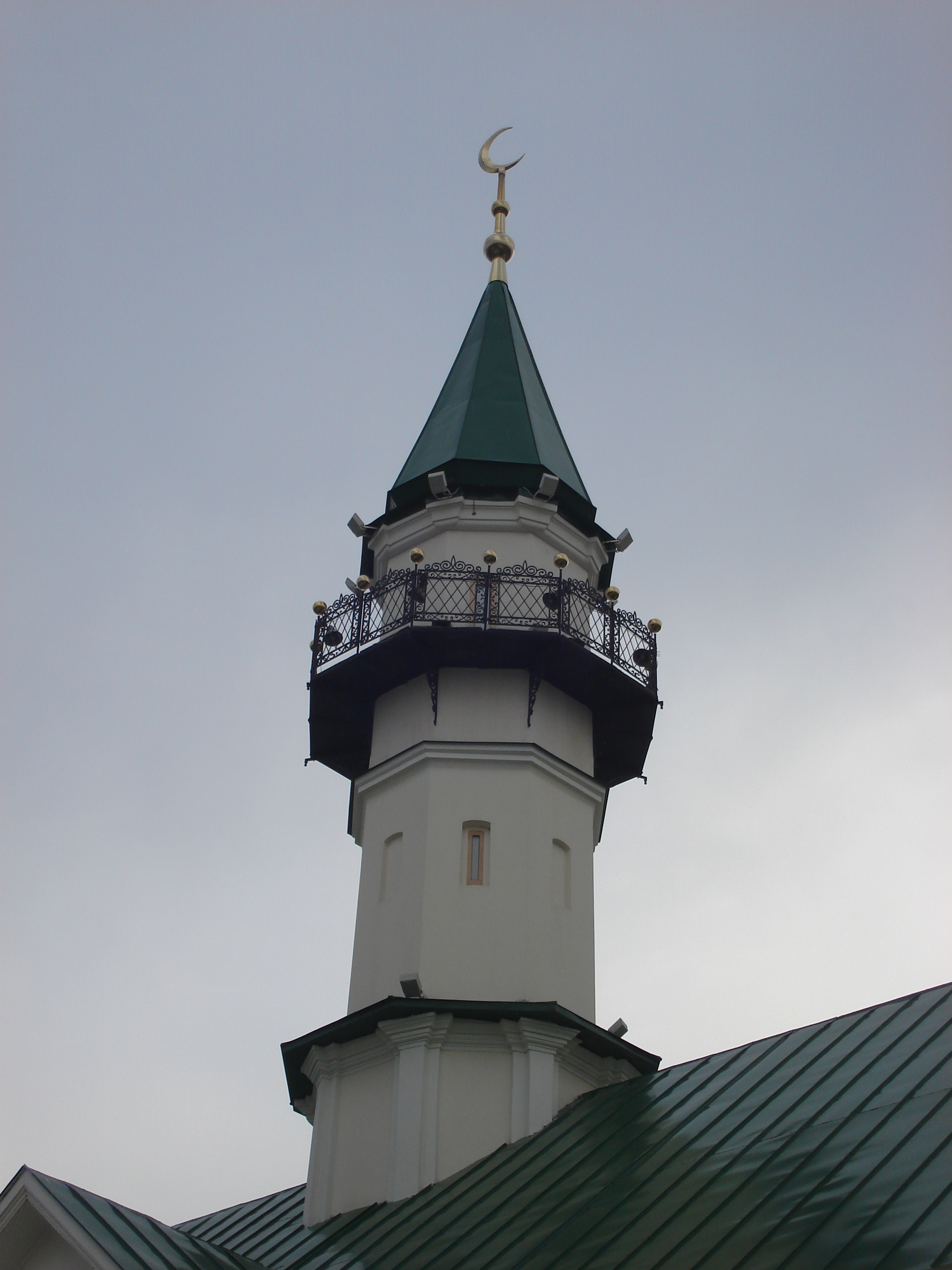
The minaret with the balcony.

After several decades of persecution of the Muslims in Imperial Russia the Märcani Mosque was the first mosque built in Kazan under Russian rule. It is the oldest active mosque in Tatarstan and the only mosque in Kazan that evaded closure during the Soviet period.

The mosque was built in traditions of the Tatar medieval architecture combined with provincial baroque style, and it represents a typical Tatar mosque. It is believed that the architect was Vasily Kaftyrev. The mosque is situated in the Old Tatar Quarter (İske Tatar Bistäse) of Kazan at the bank of the lake Qaban.

Märcani Mosque is two-storied and has two halls. The interior is designed in The Petersburg Baroque style. In 1861 merchant İ. Ğ. Yunısov donated the addition of stairs, and in 1863 he donated the extension of mihrab and the breaching of new window. In that period the mosque was called Yunısovs' mosque after his family. In 1885 merchant Z. Ğosmanov donated the renovation of the minaret. In 1887 merchants W. Ğizzätullin and M. Wälişin added the tracery balcony to the minaret.

The mosque is currently named after Tatar scholar Şihabetdin Märcani who worked there as imam in the mid 19th century.

== See also ==
- Saint Petersburg Mosque
- Islam in Tatarstan
- Islam in Russia
- List of mosques in Russia
- List of mosques in Europe
