= Nauryzbay Talasov =

Kazakh scientist

- Наурызбай Таласұлы
- Born: Kokshetau, Kazakhstan

Nauryzbay Talasov, known as Nauan Hazrat (Kazakh: Наурызбай Таласұлы, Nauryzbai Talasūly; 1843 – 1926) was a Kazakh religious leader.

Nauan Hazrat was born in 1843 in the village of Zhilkeldy of the Mezgil volost of the Kokshetau District.

He studied at Nauryzbay aul school, and then in a madrasah in Petropavlovsk, after which he, as a gifted student, was recommended to the Kokaltash Higher Theological Seminary in Bukhara. He also entered the theological seminary in the early 1870s. At the end of the courses, N. Talasov, as the most capable seminarist, was sent for an internship in Baghdad.

He made a lot of contributions to the spiritual education of religious devout in the city of Kokshetau and was the imam of the main mosque in the city. Nauan Hazret died in Kokshetau in 1916 at the age of 73 and was buried in a Muslim cemetery on the shore of Lake Kopa.

== See also ==
- Islam in Kazakhstan
