= Nur-Astana Mosque =

Mosque in Astana, Kazakhstan

- Nur-Astana meshiti Нұр-Астана мешіті

- Location within Kazakhstan

Religion
- Affiliation: Islam
- Leadership: Imam(s): Absattar Derbisali

Location
- Location: Astana, Kazakhstan
- Administration: Spiritual Association of Muslims of Kazakhstan
- Coordinates: 51.12°N 71.43°E

Architecture
- Architect: Charles Hadife
- Type: Mosque
- Style: Islamic
- Established: 2008

Specifications
- Capacity: 5,000
- Minaret: 4
- Minaret height: 63 meters (207 ft)
- Materials: Glass, concrete, granite and alucobond

The Nur-Astana Mosque (Kazakh: Nur-Astana meshiti/Нұр-Астана мешіті; Russian: Мечеть «Нур Астана»), is a mosque in Astana, Kazakhstan. It is third largest mosque in Central Asia. The 40-meter (131-foot) height symbolizes the age of the Islamic prophet Muhammad when he received the revelations, and the height of the minarets are 63 meters (207 foot), the age Muhammad was when he died.

The mosque designed by Charles Hadife an architect based in Beirut Lebanon is located at the left riverbank in the city of Astana, construction first started in March 2005. The mosque was a gift in accordance with the agreement of the Kazakhstan President, Nursultan Nazarbayev and the Emir of Qatar, Hamad bin Khalifa. It has a capacity of 5,000 worshippers inside the mosque, including 2,000 for worshippers outside the mosque. The structure is made of glass, concrete, granite and alucobond measures.

== See also ==
- List of mosques in Kazakhstan
- Islam in Kazakhstan
