= Iske Tash Mosque =

Mosque in Kazan, Tatarstan, Russia

İske Taş Mosque
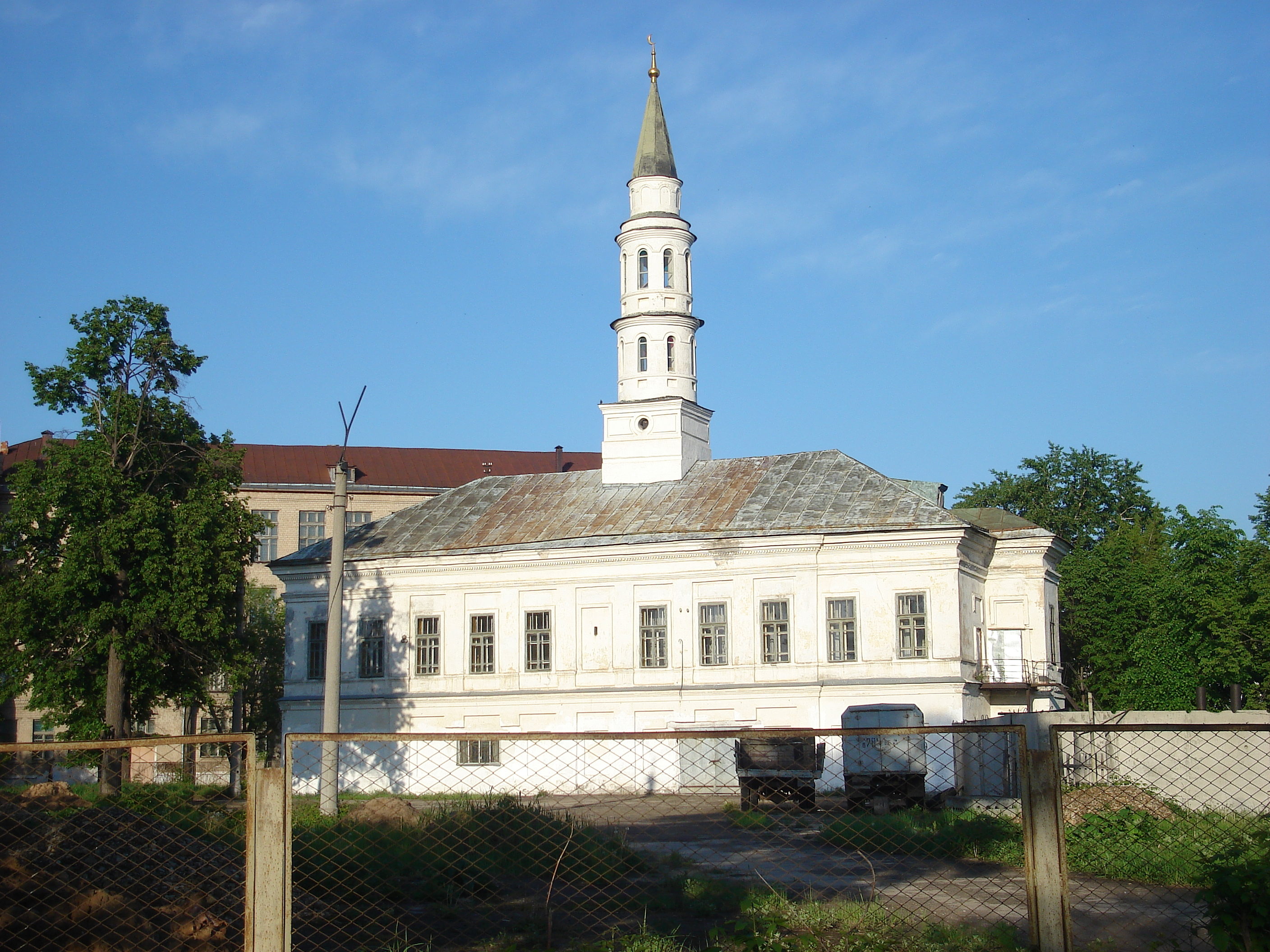

Religion
- Affiliation: Islam
- District: Tatarstan
- Status: Active

Location
- Location: Kazan, Russia
- Interactive map of İske Taş Mosque
- Coordinates: 55°46′10″N 49°06′06″E

Architecture
- Type: Mosque
- Completed: 1802
- Minaret: 1

The İske Taş (Tatar pronunciation: [isˈke tʌʃ]) or Iske Tash Mosque, also the Old Stone Mosque (via Tatar: Иске Таш мәчет, romanized: İske Taş mäçet, Russian: Старокаменная мечеть, мечеть Иске-Таш, Starokamennaya, Iske-Tash) or the Mosque of the Old Stone (via Tatar: Иске Таш мәчете, romanized: İske Taş mäçete), formerly known as The Ninth Cathedral Mosque, The Big Stone Mosque, is a mosque in Kazan, Russia.

== History ==
According to the old legend, it was erected on the place of a communal grave of the fighting men who defended Kazan in 1552. The grave was marked by a big old stone (zur iske taş), which has been preserved in front of the east facade of the mosque for many years after its erection.

The mosque was built in 1802 with donations of merchant Ğabdulla Ütämişev. The qibla of the mosque was set by Ghabdennasir Qursawi. In 1830 it was reconstructed according to the project of Alexander Schmidt. The mosque's façades were rebuilt in classicism traditions. Their strictness is accentuated by the minaret with three tiers set on a thick cross wall between the praying rooms. The minarets' shape is associated with the minarets in the ancient towns Bolghar and Kasimov. The mosque is two-storied, has two halls, the minaret is placed in the center of gable roof.

In the 19th century the imams were from Amirkhan family.

The mosque was closed according to the decision of Central Executive Committee of Tatar ASSR at the end of the 1930s. It was used as a school and then as storage during the Soviet rule. In 1994 it was returned to the believers.

== See also ==
- Islam in Tatarstan
- Islam in Russia
- List of mosques in Russia
- List of mosques in Europe
