= Mashkhur Jusup Mosque =

Mosque in Pavlodar, Kazakhstan

- Мәшһүр Жүсіп мешіті
- Location within Kazakhstan

Religion
- Affiliation: Islam
- Branch/tradition: Hanafi

Location
- Municipality: Pavlodar
- Country: Kazakhstan
- Interactive map of Mashkhur Jusup Mosque
- Coordinates: 52.286504°N 76.962168°E

Architecture
- Type: mosque
- Completed: 2001

Specifications
- Capacity: 1,500 worshippers
- Interior area: 7,240 m^{2}
- Dome height (outer): 54 m
- Minaret height: 63 m

The Mashkhur Jusup Mosque (Kazakh: Мәшһүр Жүсіп мешіті, romanized: Mäşhür Jüsıp meşıtı; Russian: Мечеть имени Машхура Жусупа) is located in the center of Pavlodar within an area of 6 ha and is one of the largest mosques in Kazakhstan. It was opened after a year of construction in 2001 and can accommodate 1,500 worshipers. The mosque was named after the Kazakh poet and historian Mashkhur Jusup (1858–1931).

== Overview ==
The construction of the mosque was entrusted to the "AlmatyGiproGor" Institute, and the work was carried out by the company "IrtyshTransStroy".

The base for the building is constructed in the form of an octagonal star with eight points that are a diameter of 48 meters by 48 meters. The height of the mosque minarets is 63 metres and its symbolic height corresponds to the age of Muhammad, the messenger of Islam. The main blue-sky dome, 54 metres high is based on the shape of a shanyrak, a circular opening at the top of a yurt.

The height of the men's prayer room, which can accommodate up to 1200 people, is 33 metres and has a diameter of 30 metres. The total area of the mosque is 7,240 m2. The building has two floors. The base is composed of bricks, and the cupolas in metal.

The crystal chandelier "Zumrad" has 434 lamps and adorns the interior of the mosque, was made in Tashkent. The architecture of the mosque is designed to resemble an open heart symbolising that the building is for good and open to the world.

The ground floor of the mosque includes the teaching rooms of the madrassah, a prayer room for women with 300 seats, a wedding hall, a 300-seat canteen with auxiliary rooms, a room for ablutions and a wardrobe. The wedding hall and canteen can be merged by removing the portable walls. The first floor includes the 1200-seat prayer hall for men, a museum of Muslim culture, a library, a projection room and offices. The main entrance of the building gives access to the first floor.

== See also ==
- Islam in Kazakhstan
