= Taza Jol Islam =

Taza Jol (Kazakh: таза жол — "pure way") is a strict form of Islam practiced amongst Turkistani and Kazakhs. Taza Jol at its core is a strict adherence to the five pillars of Islam, but beyond that it requires observers to live a godfearing and charitable life.

The Taza Jol is a difficult belief system to satisfy; most cosmopolitan Kazakhs cannot fulfill its obligations, so that Taza Jol is largely practiced in old age, when a person has the time and resources to commit. For this reason, many of these aged individuals will strive to fulfill their Muslim obligations, as well as practice the Taza Jol for those in their family. Taza Jol is the way of practicing Islam which most Muslims in the region aspire to. However, to strictly follow the practice has become too trying for Muslims of the present day.
