= Manjali Mosque =

Mosque in Atyrau, Kazakhstan

- Imanǵalı meshiti
- Location within Kazakhstan

Religion
- Affiliation: Hanafi

Location
- Location: Atyrau, Kazakhstan,
- Coordinates: 47.1058359°N 51.9005701°E

Architecture
- Type: Mosque
- Style: Islamic
- Groundbreaking: 1999
- Completed: 2001

Specifications
- Capacity: 600
- Height (max): 15 m
- Dome height (outer): 23 m
- Dome dia. (outer): 7 m
- Dome dia. (inner): 5 m
- Minaret: 2
- Minaret height: 20.7

The Manjali Mosque (Kazakh: Иманғали мешіті, Imanǵalı meshiti; Russian: Мечеть Имангали, romanized: Mechet' Imangali) is located on Satpayev Avenue in the center of Atyrau, Kazakhstan. Construction began in 1999 and was completed in 2001. The mosque opened for public use on 5 May 2001 and can accommodate 600 worshipers.

The mosque has a large dome with a height of 23 meters. Its outer diameter measures at 7 metres and inner diameter at 5 metres. The total area of the mosque, including the grounds surrounding it, is 1328.3 square metres, with the mosque itself occupying 1093.1 sq.m. It consists of 2 floors, two large halls, five prayer rooms, men's and women's prayer rooms, a reading room, a madrassa, a library and additional rooms for men and women. The walls of the mosque are 15 metres in height. The relief atop the entrance door resembles a warrior's helmet. The mosque has two minarets with both having a height of 20.7 metres. The height of the minbar is 3 metres and made of high-quality wood. The diameter of the remaining 6 small domes atop on the roof are 1 metre. Outside the mosque there is an additional building of 235.2 square metres. There are rooms for imams and families. There are also toilets for men and women.
