= Tatar mosque =

Mosque with a minaret on the roof

- Татар мәчете
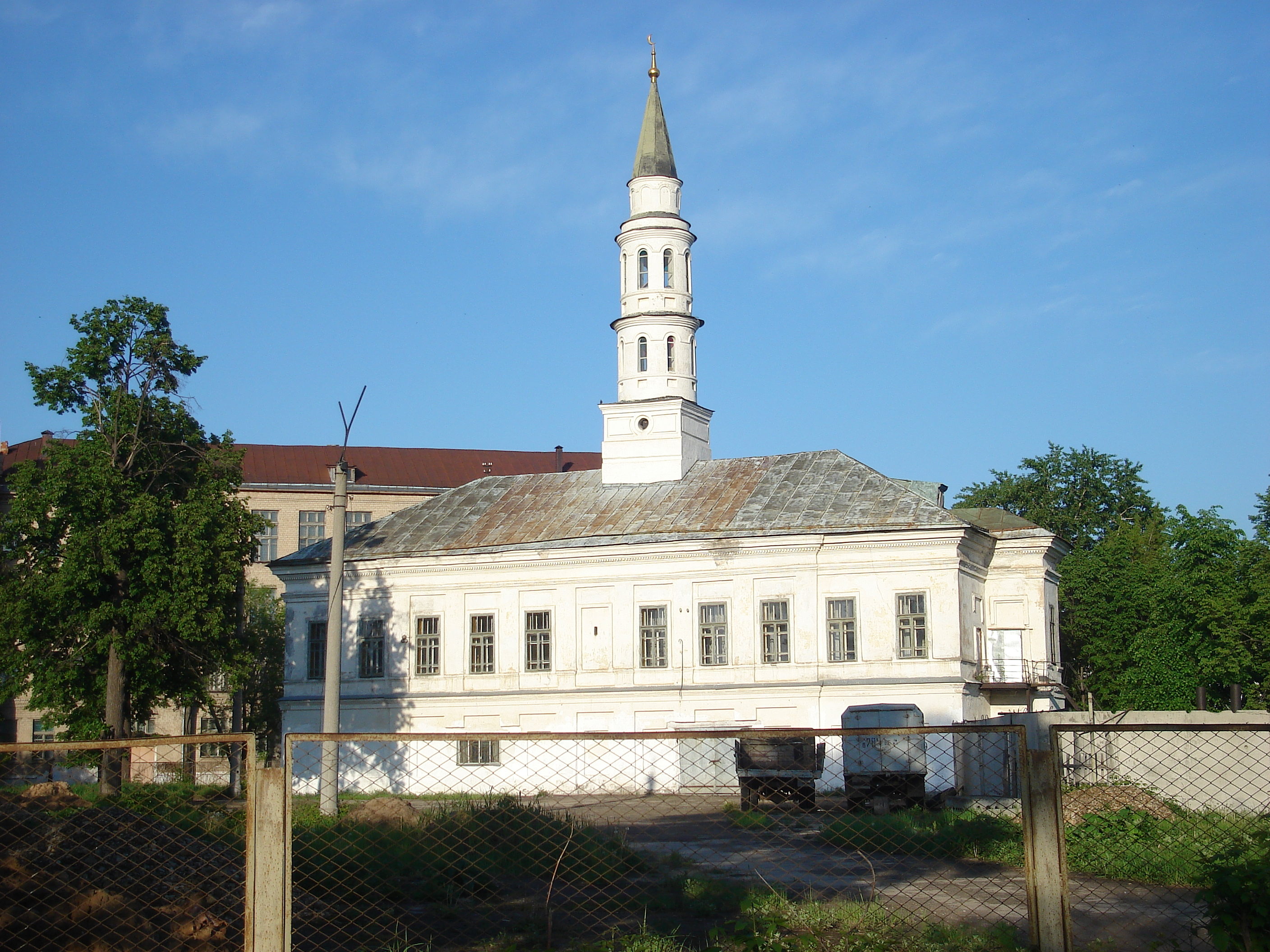

Religion
- Affiliation: Islam

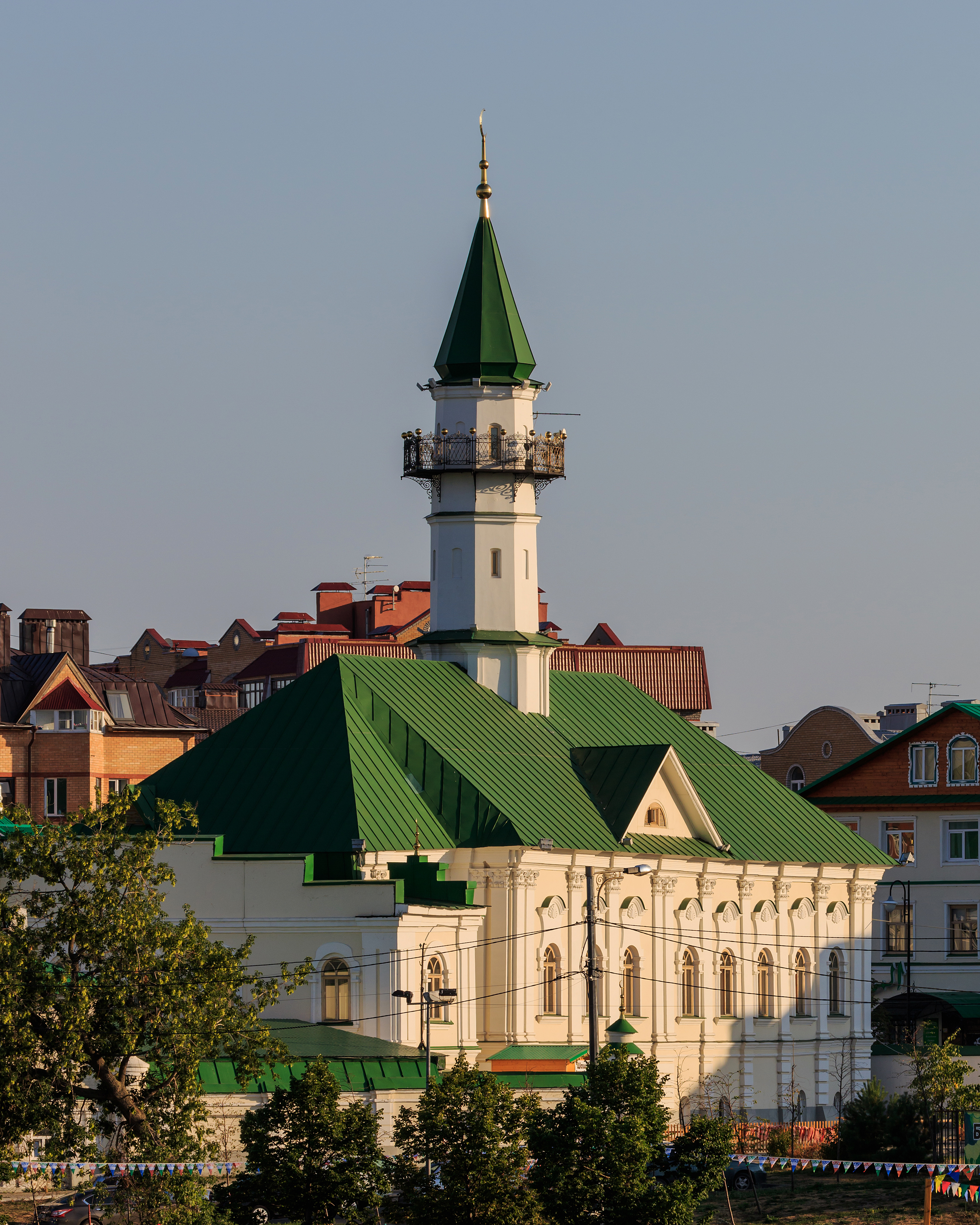
Märcani Mosque

A Tatar mosque is a mosque with a minaret on the roof, a type of mosque that is ubiquitous among Muslim Tatars and Bashkirs in Tatarstan and other Volga Tatar-populated areas. Occasionally found in other regions of Russia, modern Tatar religious architecture was developed in the late 18th century and gained popularity in the 19th century Idel-Ural.

== History ==
The earliest examples of Islamic Tatar architecture are located in Bolghar; none of them are in use today. They reflect strong similarities to Central Asian Islamic architecture from which the designs were derived. However, it is believed that design of the rural mosques, unlike the Central Asian-like mosques the cities, evolved from their ability to withstand the harsh local climate. Many mosques, both stone and wooden, were built according to this style. The oldest of the still active modern Tatar mosques is the Märcani mosque in the Tatar capital of Kazan. Dating from the reign of Catherine the Great, the mosque's minaret was placed in the center of a gabled roof. It is believed that the concept was adopted from traditional rural Tatar mosques. The Märcani mosque is an example of revival Tatar religious architecture as most mosques were destroyed due to the Christianization edict of 1742.

== Unification ==
The edict on unification of church buildings of 1817 was expanded to the mosques in 1831, when the exemplary project was developed and circulated to governorate architectural offices of Kazan, Nizhny Novgorod, Perm and Simbirsk Governorates. Tatar mosques, such as Märcani and Apanay were built in Baroque style. İske Taş and Pink Mosque were contributed to classicism style.

Among the architects, contributed to the mosques building in the 19th century the most notable were Pyatnitsky, Korinfsky, Schmidt, Peske, Romanov, Yermolayev, Pavlov, Parensov, Petondi, Tekhomirov, as well as non-professional architects Mansurov, Foshderebryuggen, Jakobson.

In 1844 another exemplary mosque project was introduced, which was used mostly for urban mosques. The minaret was placed at the northern part of the building, under the door. However, mosques with minarets on the roof are constructed till today.

== Gallery ==
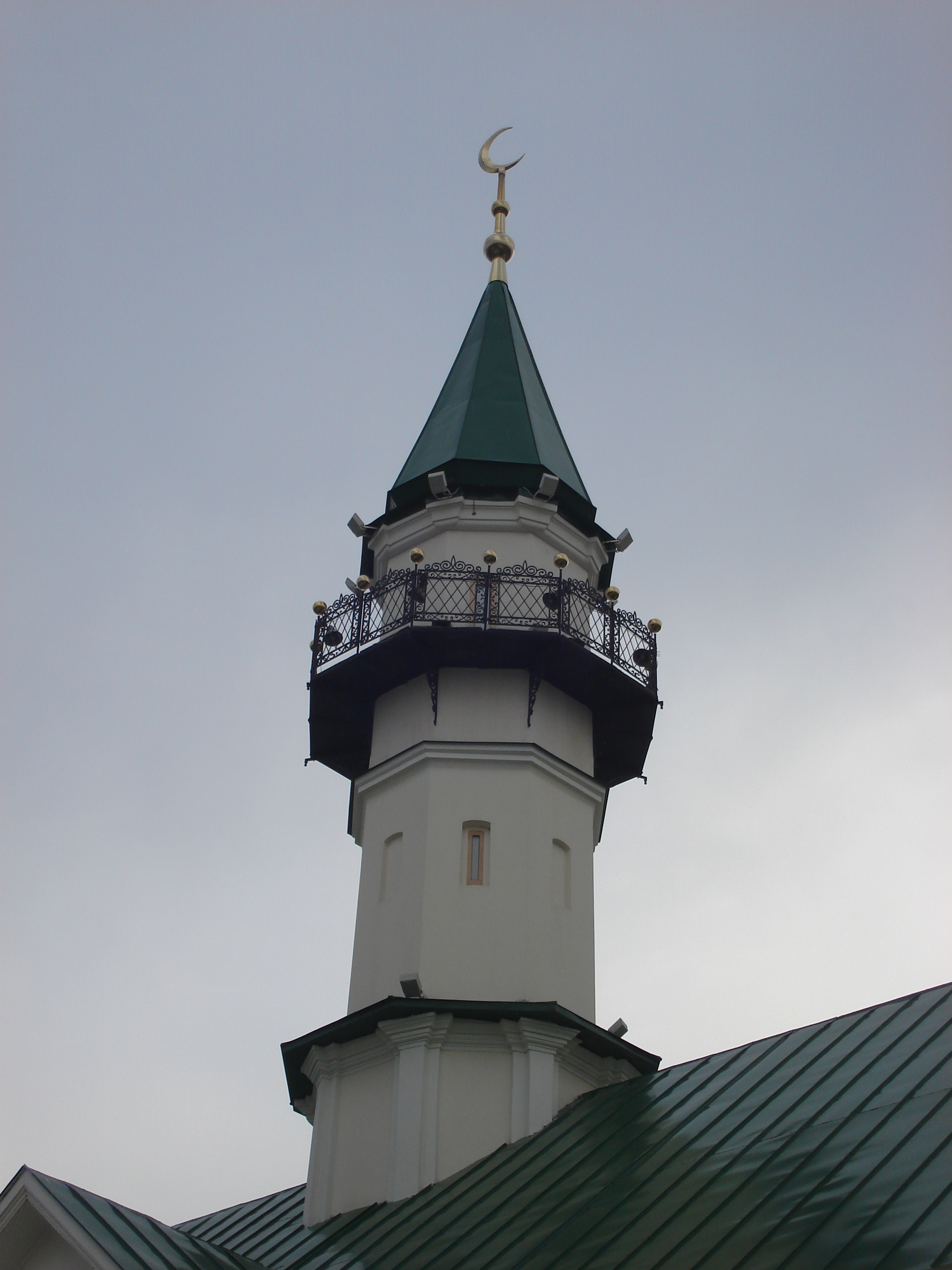
Märcani Mosque.

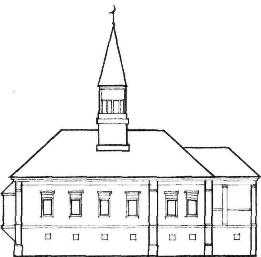
Drawing of the cathedral mosque of Buinsky Uyezd, Simbirsk Governorate by Jakobson, 1876.

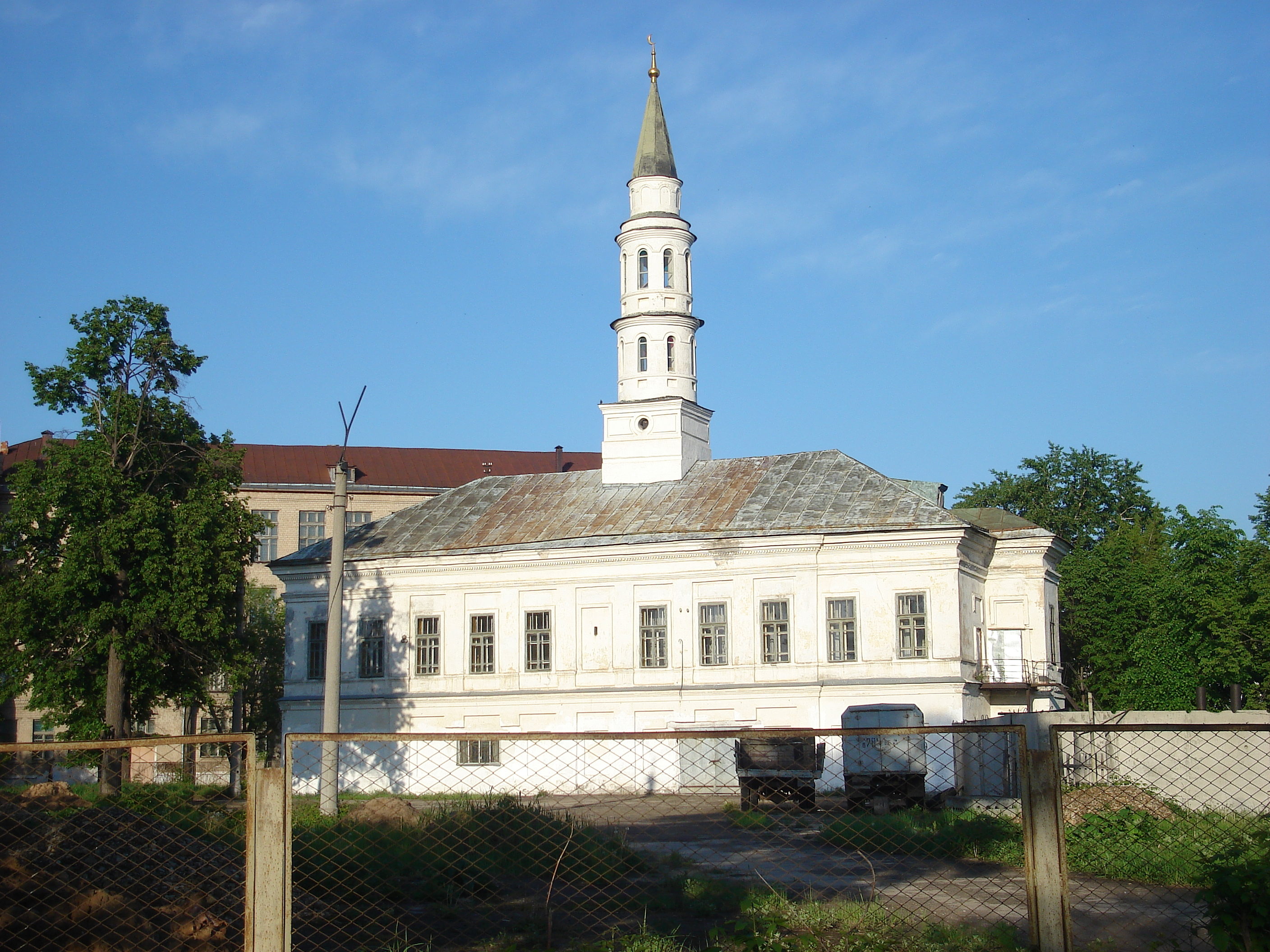
The İske Taş Mosque

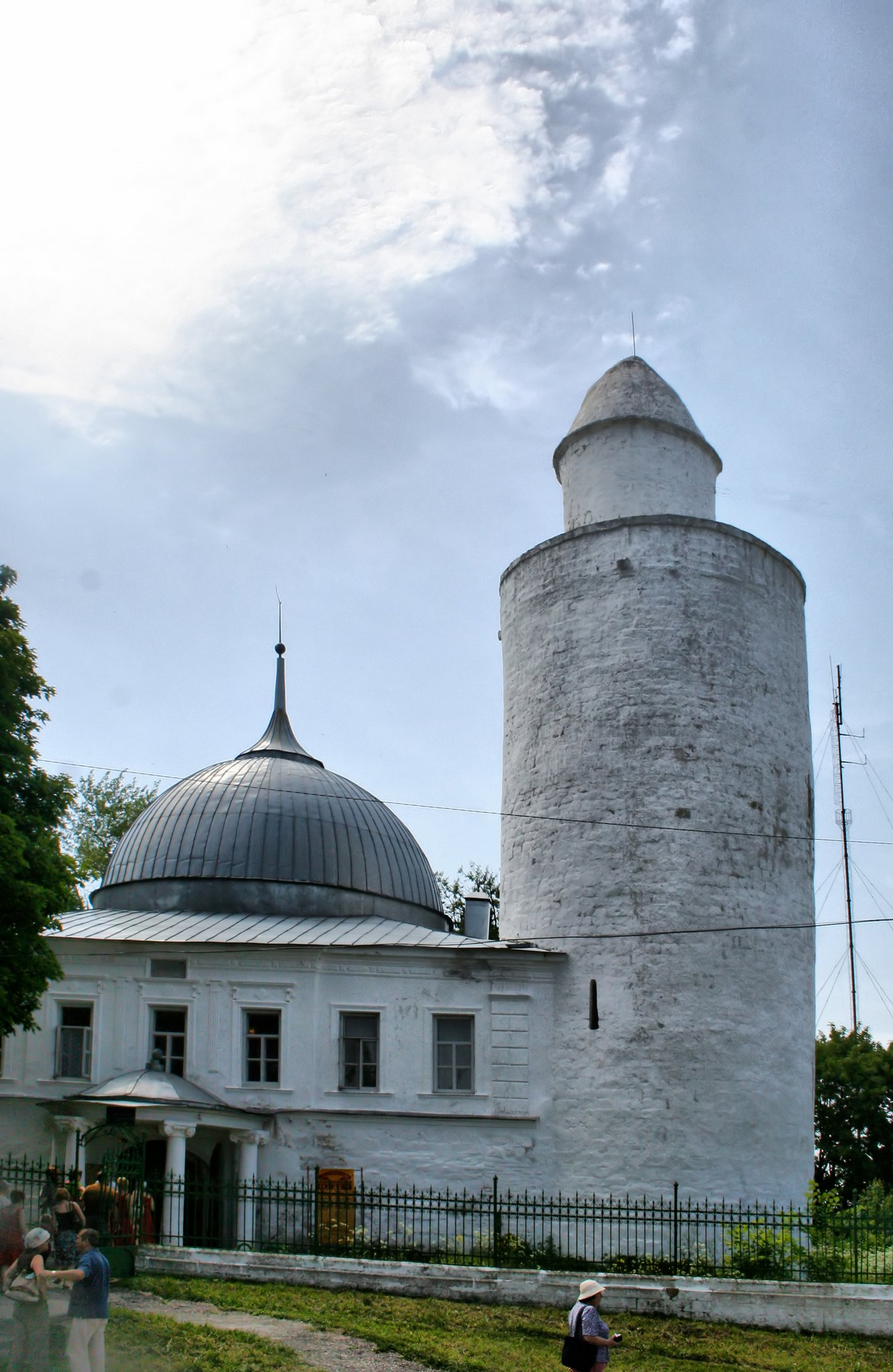
Khan's Mosque in Kasimov
