= Central Mosque Almaty =

Largest mosque in Almaty, Kazakhstan

- Almaty ortalyq meshiti/Алматы орталық мешіті
- The mosque in 2023

- Location within Kazakhstan

Religion
- Affiliation: Hanafi
- Leadership: Yesmagambet Nurbek

Location
- Location: Almaty, Kazakhstan
- Interactive map of Central Mosque Almaty
- Coordinates: 43.268438°N 76.953324°E

Architecture
- Architects: Sultan Baimagambetov; Zhanabayev Sharapiev; Kazbek Zharylgapov
- Type: Mosque
- Style: Islamic
- Groundbreaking: 1996
- Completed: 1999

Specifications
- Capacity: 7000
- Dome height (outer): 36 m
- Dome dia. (outer): 20 m

Website
- http://www.azan.kz/

Almaty Central Mosque (Kazakh: Almaty ortalyq meshiti/Алматы орталық мешіті, Russian: Centralnaya mechet Almaty/Центральная мечеть Алматы) is one of the largest mosques in Almaty, and in Kazakhstan. Designed to accommodate 7,000 worshippers, it was built on the site of the old mosque that dated to 1890 and caught fire in 1987.

== History ==
The Central Mosque was built on the site of the old Tatar Mosque, which had functioned since 1890. The foundation of the mosque was poured in 1993, but construction was not completed until 1999. The architects of the project were Baimagambetov, Sharapiev and Zharylgapov.

In 2000, the large dome was decorated with Koranic ayats or verses performed by Turkish calligraphers; high quality sound-amplifying equipment was purchased. The entire first floor was renovated, a powerful air-conditioner installed, the offices of the chief imam and the accountant were fitted out with modern equipment, the chairs in the Koran-reading room were replaced with ones made of precious wood, a lawn of 1,700 m² was laid out. It is designed for 7,000 worshippers. The mosque is crowned with a dome with a diameter of 20 meters and a height of 36 meters.

The mosque is a domed, rectangular building with a minaret stretching along the east-west axis. The mosque has a total (simultaneous) capacity of about 3,000 people. The main entrance of the building is designed in the form of a peshtak. The dome is set on a two-tiered drum - octahedron with arched window openings, passing into a cylinder, and lined with blue tiles. The motif of the main dome is repeated in the four corner guldastas. The walls are faced with white marble. The color mosaic decorates the drum of the main dome. On the portal inserts of the carved marble blocks. The canvas of the entrance oak doors is also covered with carving on motives of national ornaments. On the southeast corner there is a two-storey passage to the minaret with the height of 47 meters.

In 2001, the building of the Republican Central Mosque was included in the State List of historical and cultural monuments of local importance in Almaty.

Originally, the mosque had a simple blue dome. In 2006, the main dome was decorated with ceramic tiles with floral ornaments. In 2010-2011, the ceramic tiles were replaced with a coating of gold plates.

== Architecture ==
The foundation of the mosque was laid in 1993. Construction was completed in 1999. In 2000, the large dome was decorated by verses from the Quran rendered by Turkish calligraphers.

The mosque has a capacity of up to 3000 people. The south-western part of the structure is turned towards Mecca. In the southwestern part, you can see an excellent pentahedral mihrab that stands out from the entire structure. Minarets are located in the corners of the building, the domes of which are covered with real gold.

The height of the minaret on the towers is 47 meters.

The main dome is 36 meters high. The inner space of the dome is decorated with colored mosaics on which the wise suras from the Koran are written.

== Cultural heritage ==
On December 22, 2006, the National Bank of Kazakhstan depicted the mosque on a limited-edition 500-tenge coin of sterling silver in order to promote a broader understanding of the entire culture of Kazakhstan, to promote the presentation of religion as a peaceful doctrine of the spiritual and moral self-improvement of the individual.

== Gallery ==
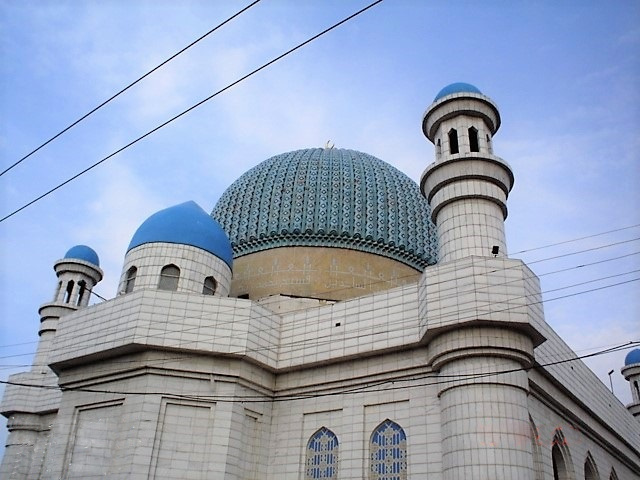
Ceramic Dome of the Central Mosque in Almaty, 2008-03

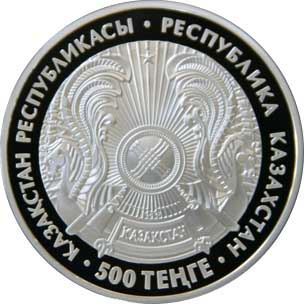
Obverse

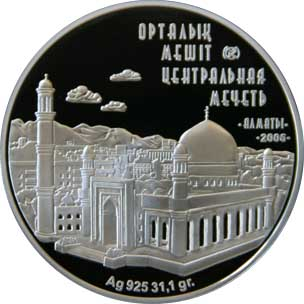
Reverse

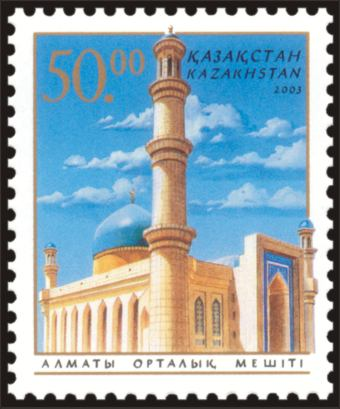
A Kazpost 50 tenge postage stamp, 2003
