= Hazrat Sultan Mosque =

Mosque in Astana, Kazakhstan

- Äzıret Sūltan meşıtı Әзірет Сұлтан мешіті

- Location within Kazakhstan

Religion
- Affiliation: Islam
- Branch/tradition: Sunni

Location
- Location: Astana, Kazakhstan
- Country: Kazakhstan
- Interactive map of Hazrat Sultan Mosque
- Coordinates: 51.1250°N 71.4722°E

Architecture
- Type: Mosque
- Groundbreaking: June 2009
- Completed: 6 July 2012

Specifications
- Capacity: 10,000
- Minaret: 4

The Hazrat Sultan Mosque (Kazakh: Äzıret Sūltan meşıtı/Әзірет Сұлтан мешіті; Russian: Хазрет Султан) is a Friday mosque in Astana, Kazakhstan.

== Construction ==
After the suggestion from president of Kazakhstan Nursultan Nazarbayev mosque named "Hazrat Sultan", which means "Holy Sultan". As well known, "Hazret Sultan" - one of the epithets of Sufi sheikh Khoja Ahmed Yasavi, author of "Divan-e Hikmat", whose mausoleum is located in Turkistan.

Construction of the mosque "Hazrat Sultan" started in Astana in June 2009. In different periods from 1000 to 1500 workers have been involved in the construction of the mosque. Hazret Sultan Mosque was opened on July 6, 2012 at 12:30, which supplemented the list of unique objects of the capital.

== Overview ==
The building was constructed in classical Islamic style with traditional Kazakh ornaments. Located on the right bank of the Yesil river the Mosque is adjacent to the Palace of Peace and Reconciliation, the monument "Kazakh Eli" and the Independence Square. It can accommodate five thousand worshipers, and on holidays - up to 10 thousand people. The area of the mosque spans across more than 11 hectares and a construction area of 17,700 square meters. Hazret Sultan has the largest dome in Kazakhstan with a height of 51 meters and a diameter, at the base of the dome, 28.1 meters. The mosque also has eight small domes with diameters of 10.45 and 7.6 meters, and peaks - 33.46 and 25, 25 meters. 4 minarets with a height of 77 meters, are located in the corners of the mosque. According to the architectural plan, the temple should crown the 80-meter spire with a crescent directed strictly towards Mecca. As the functionality of the object, it may be noted that the building provides space for bathing rituals and weddings, halls to read the Quran, and sitting in educational groups.

Mosque viewed from city streetscape

Mosque entrance

Mosque entrance

Mosque interior

Mosque during winter

== See also ==
- Islam in Kazakhstan
