= Islam in Kazakhstan =

Islam is the largest religion practiced in Kazakhstan, with 69.3% of the country's population being Muslim according to the 2021 census. Ethnic Kazakhs are predominantly non-denominational and Sunni Muslims of the Hanafi school. Geographically, Kazakhstan is the northernmost Muslim-majority country in the world, and the largest in terms of land area. Kazakhs make up over half of the total population, and other ethnic groups of Muslim background include Uzbeks, Uyghurs and Tatars. According to the Constitution, The Republic of Kazakhstan proclaims itself as a democratic, secular, legal and social state whose supreme values are the individual, his or her life, rights, and freedoms.

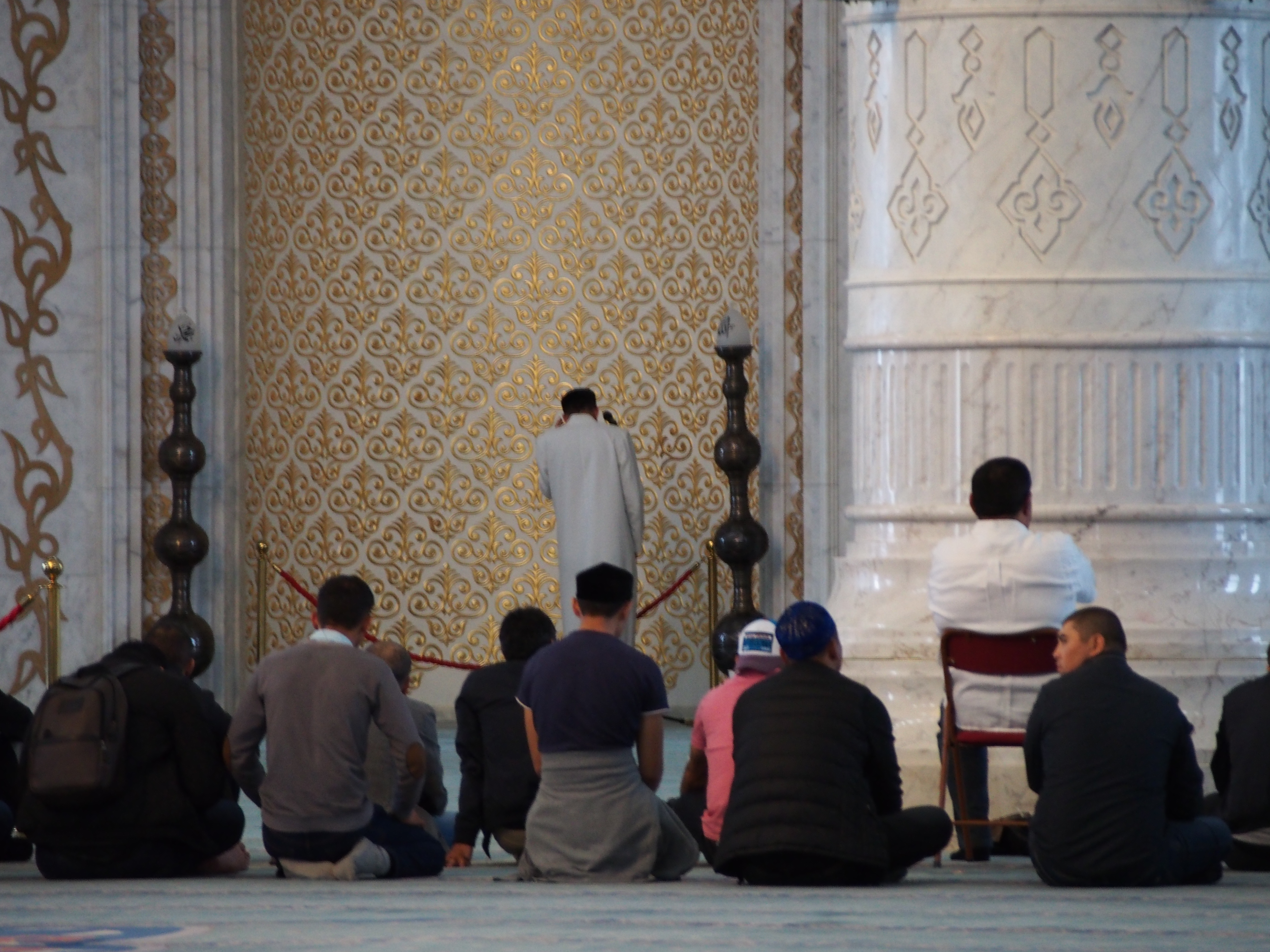
Kazakhs performing Salah in a mosque.

According to a survey by Central Asian Affairs, self-identification as Muslim among "ethnic Muslims" (members of traditionally Muslim ethnic groups including Kazakhs, Uzbeks, Tatars, Uyghurs, and others) in Kazakhstan rose from 79% in 2007 to 93% in 2012, however the share of people praying daily and attending mosque weekly declined during the same period, from 22.94% to 18.20%. According to another study in 2012, 10% of the Kazakhs practice Islam in its totality and stated youth were frequenting mosques more often. In 2019, there were 2500 mosques in the country, a number which increased 37-fold since the fall of the Soviet Union.

== History ==
Islam was first brought to the southern fringes of modern day Kazakhstan in 8th century, when the Arabs arrived in southern parts of Central Asia. Then it gradually spread across the Kazakh Steppe over following centuries.

The initial push to spread was given by the Battle of Talas in 751 AD, where nomads of Karluk Yabghu state allied themselves with Abbasid Arabs to stop the Chinese Tan dynasty advance. In the following years, Islam took hold in the southern portions of Turkestan and thereafter gradually spread northward. Islam also took root due to zealous subjugation from Samanid rulers, notably in areas surrounding Taraz where a significant number of indigenous people converted to Islam.

In 1000s, Khoja Ahmad Yasawi, a Turkic poet and religions leader of Sufi Order made a big impact in spreading Islam among both sedentary and nomadic peoples of Central Asia, by writing in Middle Turkic language. He was widely regarded as one of the great spiritual leaders of the region. Which lead Timur to erect a Mausoleum in his name several centuries later.

The Dasht-i Qipchaq region as a whole had been Muslim since the first half of the 14th century, with Kazakhs already considering Islam their ancestral religion adopted by their ancestors in the distant past.

During Golden Horde period, the first ruler to convert to Islam was Berke Khan, a grandson of Genghis Khan. However Berke did not promote it to his subordinates.

Only in 1321, ruler of the Horde - Özbeg Khan publicly converts to Islam by Ibn Abdul Hamid, a Sunni Sufi Bukharan sayyid and sheikh of the Yassawi order. Further he makes the Islam official religion of the state, and starts promoting it among his subordinates. From that point on, all of the khans adopt Islamic names following Turco-Mongol tradition.

Following centuries, after dissolution of Golden Horde, all khans of Kazakh Khanate being from Jochi lineage would continue to have Islamic names.

=== Russian Imperial Period ===
During the 18th century, Russian influence rapidly increased toward the region. Led by Empress Catherine, the Russians initially demonstrated a willingness in allowing Islam to flourish as Muslim clerics were invited into the region to preach to the Kazakhs whom the Russians viewed as "savages", ignorant of morals and ethics.

The growth of Islamic institutions among Kazakh nomads occurred alongside a broader Islamic revival that had been taking place among Muslim communities in the Volga-Ural region and Siberia since the late eighteenth century. The spread of Islam across the steppe, particularly by Muslim merchants from Russia, was closely connected to the Kazakh steppe’s incorporation into the Russian economic sphere.

Catherine II's late 18th-century policies institutionalized Muslim religious life, with Russians appointing an akhund for Orenburg by 1742. Beginning in 1782, Empress Catherine subsidized mosque and madrasa construction in steppe settlements like Orenburg, Troitsk, and Petropavlovsk, staffed by politically reliable Volga-Ural clerics. These towns became major commercial and Islamic learning centers that attracted Kazakh nomads. The establishment of the Orenburg Muslim Spiritual Assembly (OMSA) in 1788 made officially registered imams responsible for encouraging congregant loyalty to the Russian state, integrating Kazakhs into "Russian Islam" institutional structures.

During the first half of the 19th century, Russian administrators typically appointed Volga-Ural mullahs (from the Tatar and Bashkir Muslim communities) to head Kazakh administrative units. Large numbers of Volga-Ural Muslims emigrated to cities on the northern periphery of the Kazakh steppe, bringing Islamic institutions and educational structures that educated Kazakhs through madrasas and itinerant teachers in nomadic encampments. The Volga-Ural-centered Islamic publishing business produced inexpensive Islamic books and pamphlets in Kazakh vernacular specifically for the Kazakh market.

However, this period also witnessed significant resistance. Kazakh hagiographic sources document numerous conflicts between Sufi ishans and Imperial Russian authorities, with notable examples including Maral Ishan, who led a holy war against Russian expansion from 1819 to 1822. Russian missionary accounts from 1910 accused ishans of "fanatizing" "simple Kazakhs" and inciting disobedience against colonial authority.

By the second half of the 19th century, Kazakh society was undergoing a profound Islamic revival that reshaped both social structures and collective identity. Although Islam had long been embedded in Kazakh life prior to the 18th century, this period marked a renewed and intensified expression of Islamic identity. Toward the century’s end, Kazakh authors began producing Islamic literature specifically for Kazakh readers, using a deliberately vernacular Kazakh language.

Russian policy gradually changed toward weakening Islam by introducing pre-Islamic elements of collective consciousness. Such attempts included methods of eulogizing pre-Islamic historical figures and imposing a sense of inferiority by sending Kazakhs to highly elite Russian military institutions. In response, Kazakh religious leaders attempted to bring religious fervor by espousing pan-Turkism, though many were persecuted as a result. During the Soviet era, Muslim institutions survived only in areas where Kazakhs significantly outnumbered non-Muslims due to everyday Muslim practices. In an attempt to conform Kazakhs into Communist ideologies, gender relations and other aspects of the Kazakh culture were key targets of social change.

=== Soviet Era ===
The early Soviet period brought devastating changes to Kazakh Islamic institutions through systematic anti-religious campaigns. Soviet religious policies were initially inconsistent before 1928, with Islamic education banned in 1923 and madrasas effectively closed, while simultaneously placing the Kazakh steppe under the Ufa muftiate's authority and expanding mosque communities. Beginning in 1928, however, authorities systematically closed mosques and destroyed minarets, with virtually all mosques in Kazakhstan ceasing to function by 1932, converted into barns, clubs, and schools.

Stalinist repression systematically targeted Islamic institutions and religious figures as part of Soviet cultural policy. The campaigns of the 1920s and 1930s targeted not only mosques and madrasas, but also kinship-based religious structures central to Kazakh social organization. Soviet authorities specifically targeted religious leaders including the ulama and Sufi ishans, along with their families, threatening the survival of entire religious lineages. This repression fell particularly heavily on Kazakh society, where holy lineages constituted a prominent feature of social organization. The First Secretary of the Communist Party of the Kazakh АSSR Filipp Goloshchekin in 1930 accused ishans and clergy of leading opposition to collectivization, while the Joint State Political Directorate (OGPU) documents specifically targeted "bandit bay-ishan elements" and made hereditary ishan status sufficient grounds for persecution. Political repression intensified in 1937-1938 against prominent religious leaders, with persecution continuing through the Stalin era.

With the outbreak of World War II in 1941, Stalin's religious policy shifted toward a partial relaxation of restrictions, permitting Muslim communities, including Kazakhs, somewhat greater scope for religious expression in order to mobilize support for the war effort. Kazakh Muslim religious leaders adopted the wartime practices of Volga-Ural and Crimean leaders from World War I, organizing fundraising efforts and offering religious endorsement for the Soviet war effort, which fostered the development of Soviet patriotism expressed through Islamic frameworks. Many Kazakhs maintained an integral collective identity that simultaneously encompassed being Kazakhs, Muslims, Soviets, and Red Army soldiers, demonstrating how Islamic identity could coexist with Soviet patriotism during wartime.

Soviet authorities attempted to encourage a controlled form of Islam under the Spiritual Administration of the Muslims of Central Asia and Kazakhstan as a unifying force in the Central Asian societies, while at the same time prohibiting true religious freedom.

Despite initial persecution, ishans and khojas gradually developed a complex accommodation with Soviet authorities. While the state could not openly acknowledge religious authority, it found it necessary to involve these figures in projects requiring popular cooperation, as ishans and khojas continued serving their religious communities. This accommodation accelerated during World War II, when war exigencies led to a temporary halt in anti-Sufi persecution. When a small number of mosques were reopened, some members of previously persecuted ishan lineages secured positions as officially appointed religious leaders. The pursuit of Soviet education in medicine and engineering by many ishan lineage members facilitated their integration into the official workforce while introducing new technologies and scientific knowledge to their communities. Their ancestral religious prestige, combined with historical associations with these professions, enhanced community acceptance of Soviet modernization through the added authority of academic and professional achievements. For the ishan lineages themselves, this fusion of religious standing with Soviet professional credentials constituted evidence of the Islamization of Soviet institutions and the system as a whole.

During the Soviet era, Islamic traditions persisted not primarily through formal institutions but through collective memory embedded in domestic religious practices. Religion among Inner Asian peoples, including Kazakhs, functioned essentially as household-centered spirituality, where Islamic traditions were maintained through family-based rituals, ancestor veneration, and the Islamic funerary cycle. This domestic preservation of religious tradition aligned with the native Kazakh emphasis on ancestor-spirits in social life, with the crucial distinction that Kazakh ancestors were conceived of as Muslims.

=== Post-Independence ===
Following Kazakhstan's independence in 1991, the country underwent what scholars describe as a re-traditionalization of Islam, a largely cultural and social reconnection with Islamic heritage among younger generations that emphasizes spiritual self-improvement, educational pursuit, and community belonging while maintaining compatibility with Kazakhstan's secular governance structure. The collapse of the Soviet Union coincided with a global Islamic renaissance that significantly impacted Central Asia, leading to renewed religious interest that served dual purposes as both ethno-cultural identity formation and genuine spiritual practice. Construction of mosques and religious schools accelerated in the 1990s, with financial help from Turkey, Egypt, and, primarily, Saudi Arabia. In 1991, 170 mosques were operating with more than half of them being newly built. At that time an estimated 230 Muslim communities were active in Kazakhstan. Since then the number of mosques has risen to 2,320 as of 2013. This infrastructure development reached symbolic milestones with the construction of major mosques in the capital, Astana: in 2012 the President unveiled the Hazrat Sultan Mosque, then the biggest Muslim worship facility in Central Asia, followed by the inauguration of the Central Mosque of Astana in 2022, which ranks among the world's ten largest mosques and is currently the largest mosque in Central Asia.

During this period, Kazakhstan forged educational ties with major SWANA institutions, sending students to Al-Azhar University and the Islamic University of Madinah, while founding domestic Islamic institutions including the University "Otyrar" (Kazakh-Arabic) in Shymkent and Ahmet Yassawi University in Turkistan. However, researchers note that many Kazakh students found it challenging to adapt to religious education abroad, with many ultimately finding Turkish Islamic traditions more compatible with local culture and Kazakhstan’s secular governance model.

By the early 2000s, following external events including September 11, 2001, and regional security concerns, state policy toward Islam grew more cautious, leading to what scholars term the "étatization of Islam"—a two-way process involving both government attempts to control Islamization and the Muslim community's desire to participate in national modernization. The Kazakhstani government has developed a comprehensive institutional framework for managing Islamic affairs through official religious bodies including the Spiritual Administration of Muslims of Kazakhstan (DUMK/SAMK), state-registered mosques, Islamic educational institutions, and charitable foundations. This system promotes traditional Hanafi Sunni Islam alongside historically rooted Sufi practices, creating regionally distinct forms of Islamic expression. The Spiritual Administration operates an extensive infrastructure of over 2,500 mosques and educational institutions, creating a relationship of "inter-dependency and complementarity" with the government rather than direct state control.

== Islam and the State ==
In 1990 Nursultan Nazarbayev, then the First Secretary of the Kazakhstan Communist Party, created a state basis for Islam by removing Kazakhstan from the authority of the Muslim Board of Central Asia, the Soviet-approved and politically oriented religious administration for all of Central Asia. Instead, Nazarbayev created a separate muftiate, or religious authority, for Kazakh Muslims.

With an eye toward the Islamic governments of nearby Iran and Afghanistan, the writers of the 1993 constitution specifically forbade religious political parties. The 1995 constitution forbids organizations that seek to stimulate racial, political, or religious discord, and imposes strict governmental control on foreign religious organizations. As did its predecessor, the 1995 constitution stipulates that Kazakhstan is a secular state; thus, Kazakhstan is the only Central Asian state whose constitution does not assign a special status to Islam. Though, Kazakhstan joined the Organisation of Islamic Cooperation in the same year. This position was based on the Nazarbayev government's foreign policy as much as on domestic considerations. Aware of the potential for investment from the Muslim countries of the Middle East, Nazarbayev visited Iran, Turkey, and Saudi Arabia; at the same time, he preferred to cast Kazakhstan as a bridge between the Muslim East and the Christian West. For example, he initially accepted only observer status in the Economic Cooperation Organization (ECO), all of whose member nations are predominantly Muslim. The president's first trip to the Muslim holy city of Mecca, which occurred in 1994, was part of an itinerary that also included a visit to Pope John Paul II in the Vatican.

The state's religious policy, formalized through legislation in 2011, aims to support authentic Islamic traditions while preventing the influence of extremist ideologies, maintaining harmony between different Islamic traditions that emphasize ethical conduct, community service, and peaceful coexistence. Research demonstrates how state and religious authorities negotiate their relationship through mutual accommodation. The state provides funding for Islamic education at home and abroad, while religious leaders align with modernization agendas. Contemporary mosque administration reflects this balance, as imams—often educated in both Islamic and secular institutions—navigate between orthodox doctrine and state visions of secular accessibility, grounding religious authority in textual scholarship and international experience.

Kazakhstan adopted a secular model that separates Islam from state governance while relegating religion to the private sphere, prioritizing national identity as the leading framework for citizen loyalty over religious identity. The emergence of "new Muslims" has created tensions between religious and national identities, with some groups rejecting traditional ethno-cultural values and national laws they perceive as incompatible with Islamic principles, leading to challenges including marginalization of certain Muslim communities and resistance to national integration policies. However, Kazakhstan has developed a model of Islamic tolerance grounded in Quranic principles and the Hanafi madhab tradition, which promotes interfaith dialogue and consensus-building while operating within what scholars identify as "post-normal times"—an era requiring ethical responses based on humility, responsibility, and tolerance.

The Kazakhstani government has also incorporated Islamic heritage into national identity-building efforts. State-led projects such as the "Sacred Geography of Kazakhstan,” launched in 2017 under the "Rukhani Zhangyru" program, have framed historic mausoleums and shrines as integral elements of national history. Scholars point out that these initiatives emphasize pre-colonial Islamic heritage as authentically Kazakh, with religious sites and pilgrimages not only serving spiritual functions but also reinforcing connections to ancestral tradition and national belonging. The reconstruction and state patronage of shrines are seen as both religious undertakings and part of local political and nation-building strategies, occasionally leading to competition between traditional religious authorities and secular elites.

== Gallery of Islamic sites and architecture ==
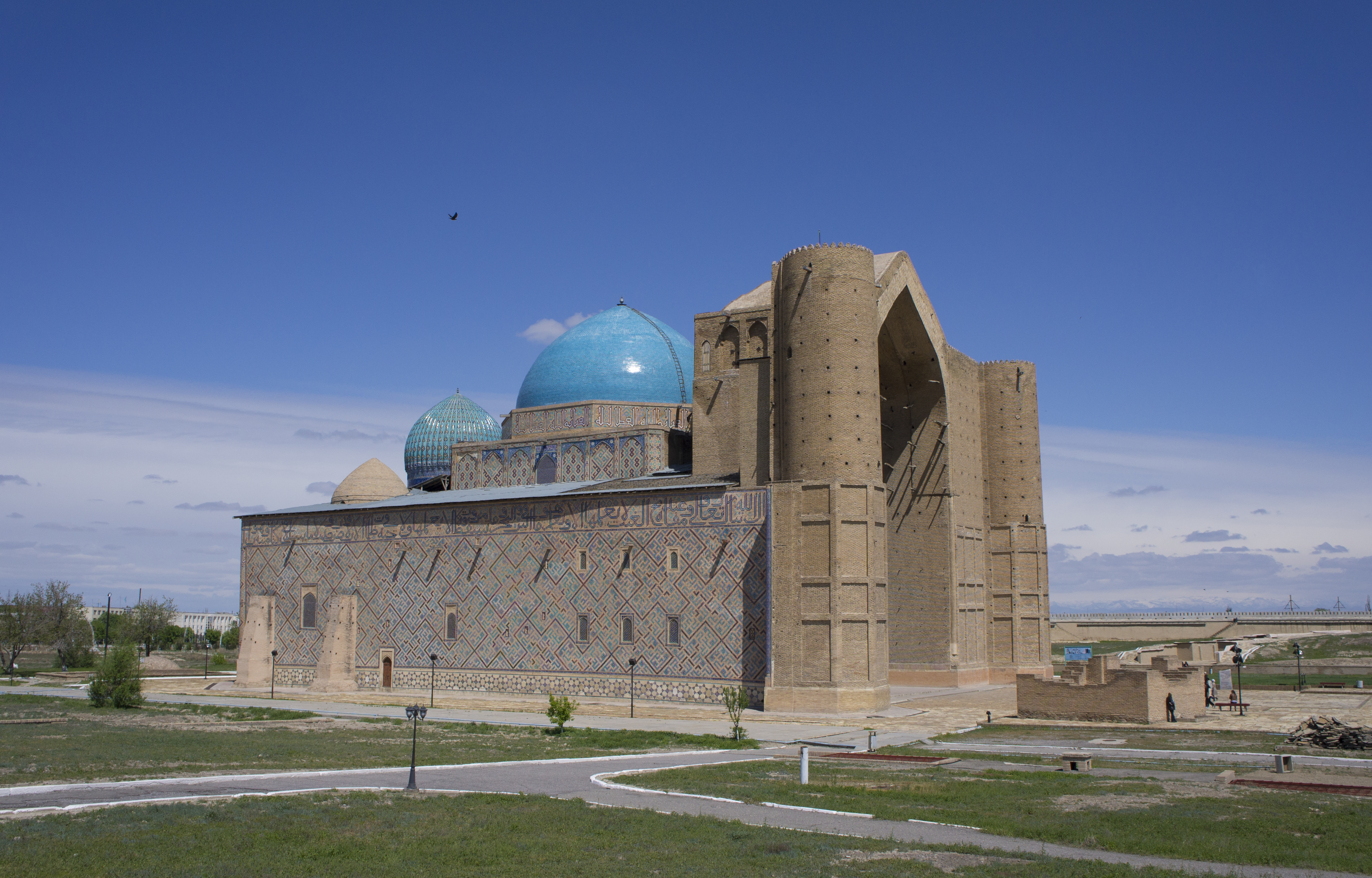
The Mausoleum of Ahmed Yasawi

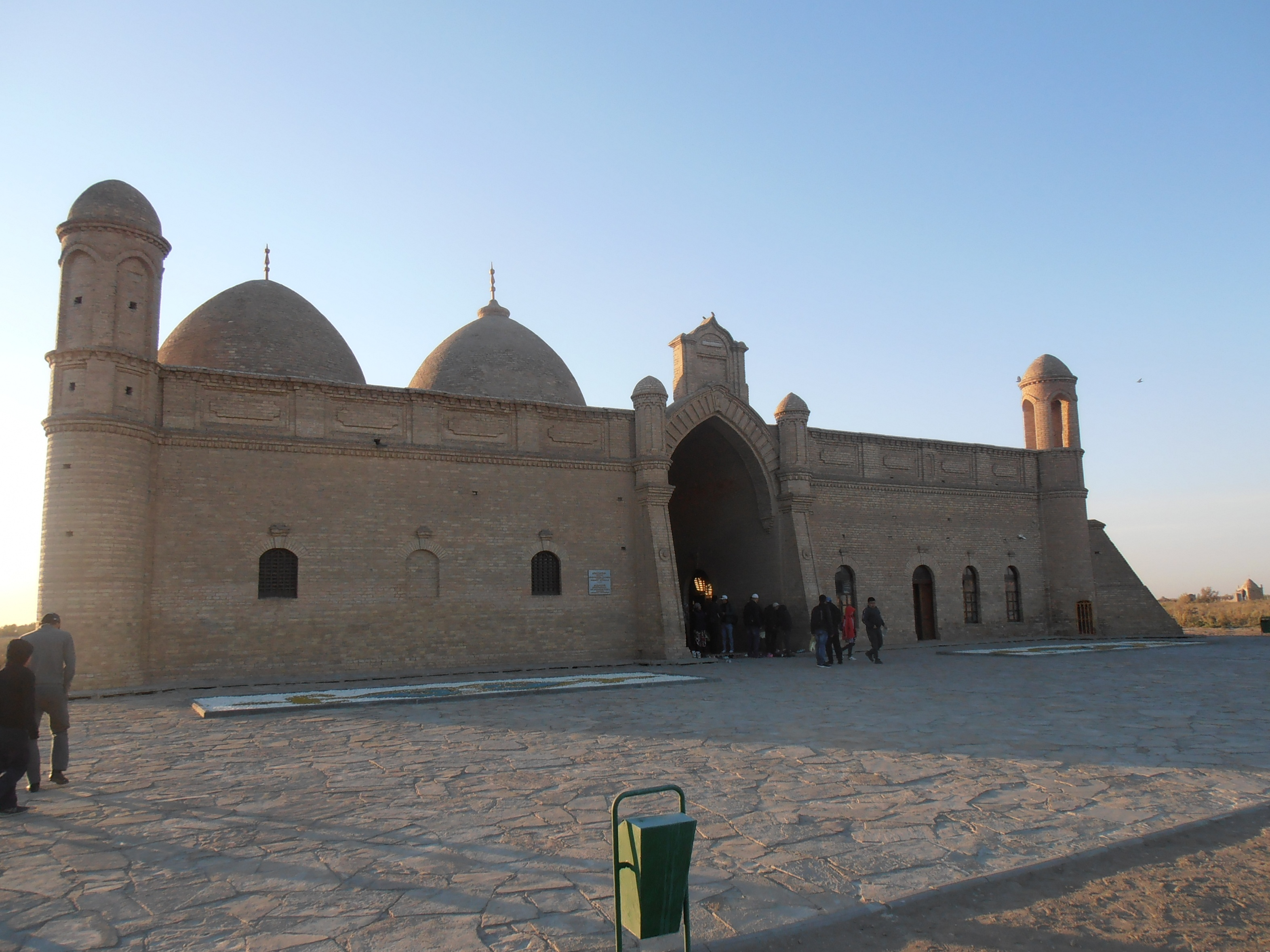
Arystan Bab Mausoleum

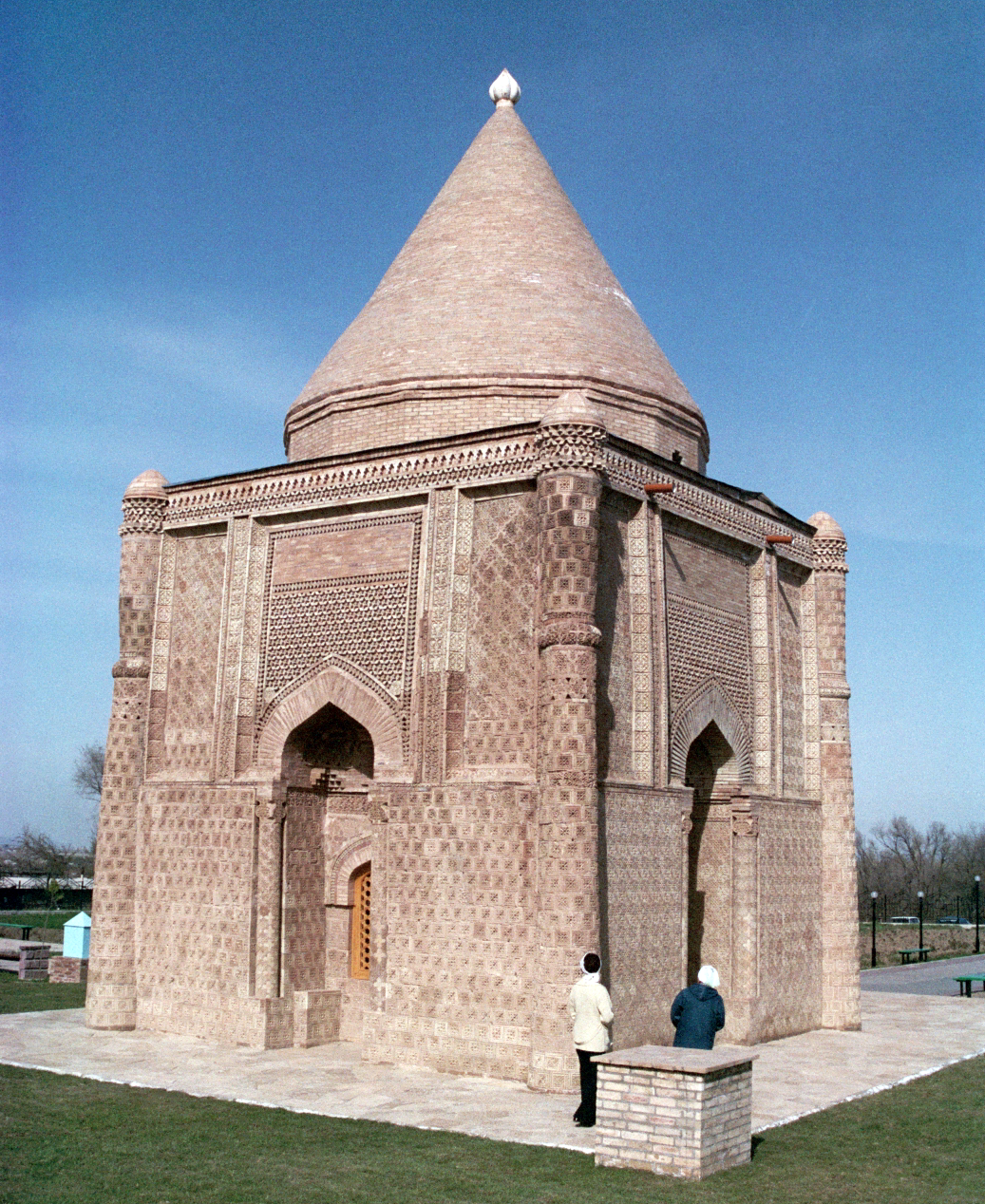
Aisha Bibi

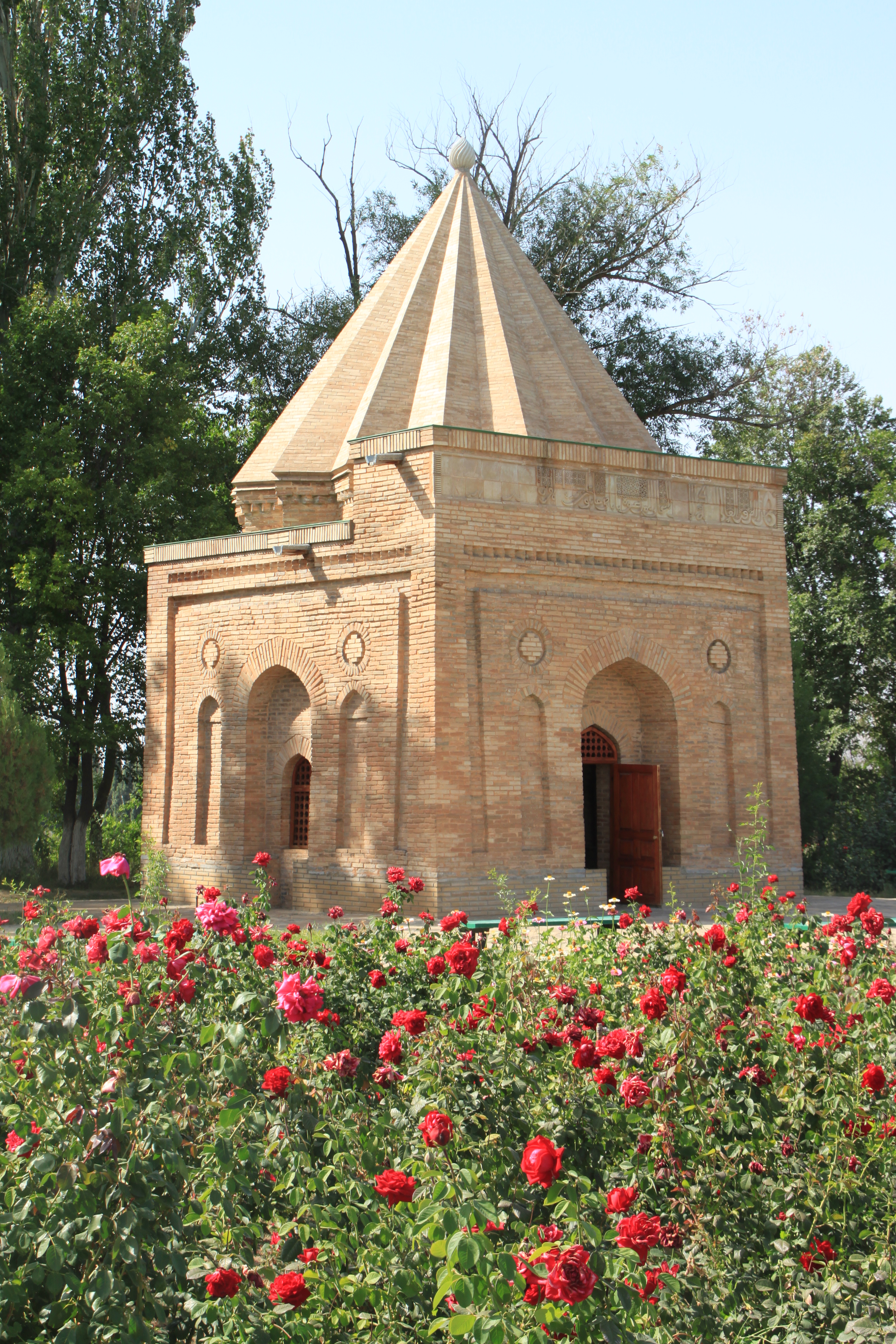
The Mausoleum of Babaji Khatun near Taraz

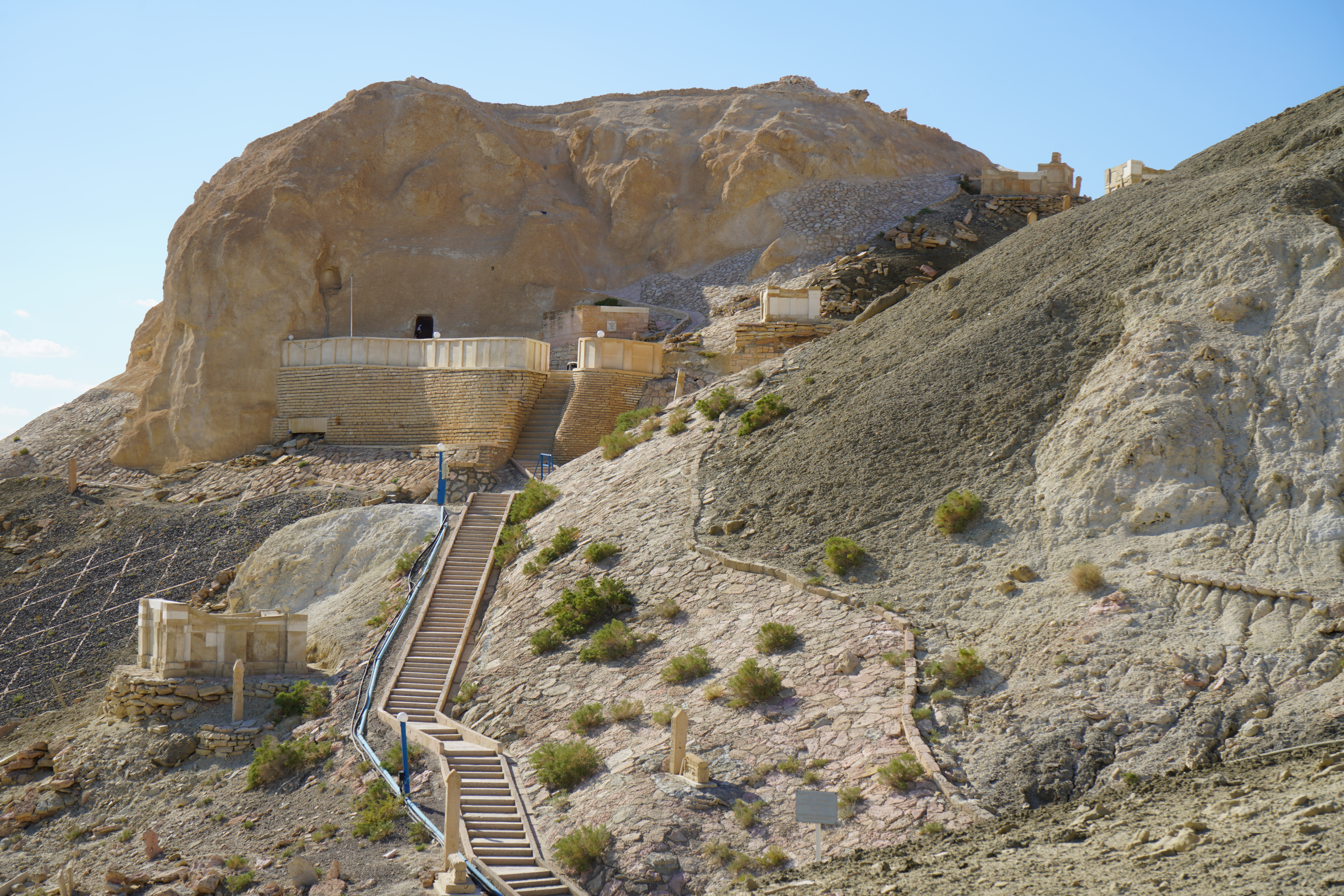
Becket-Ata Underground Mosque in Oglandy (18th-19th centuries), Mangystau Region

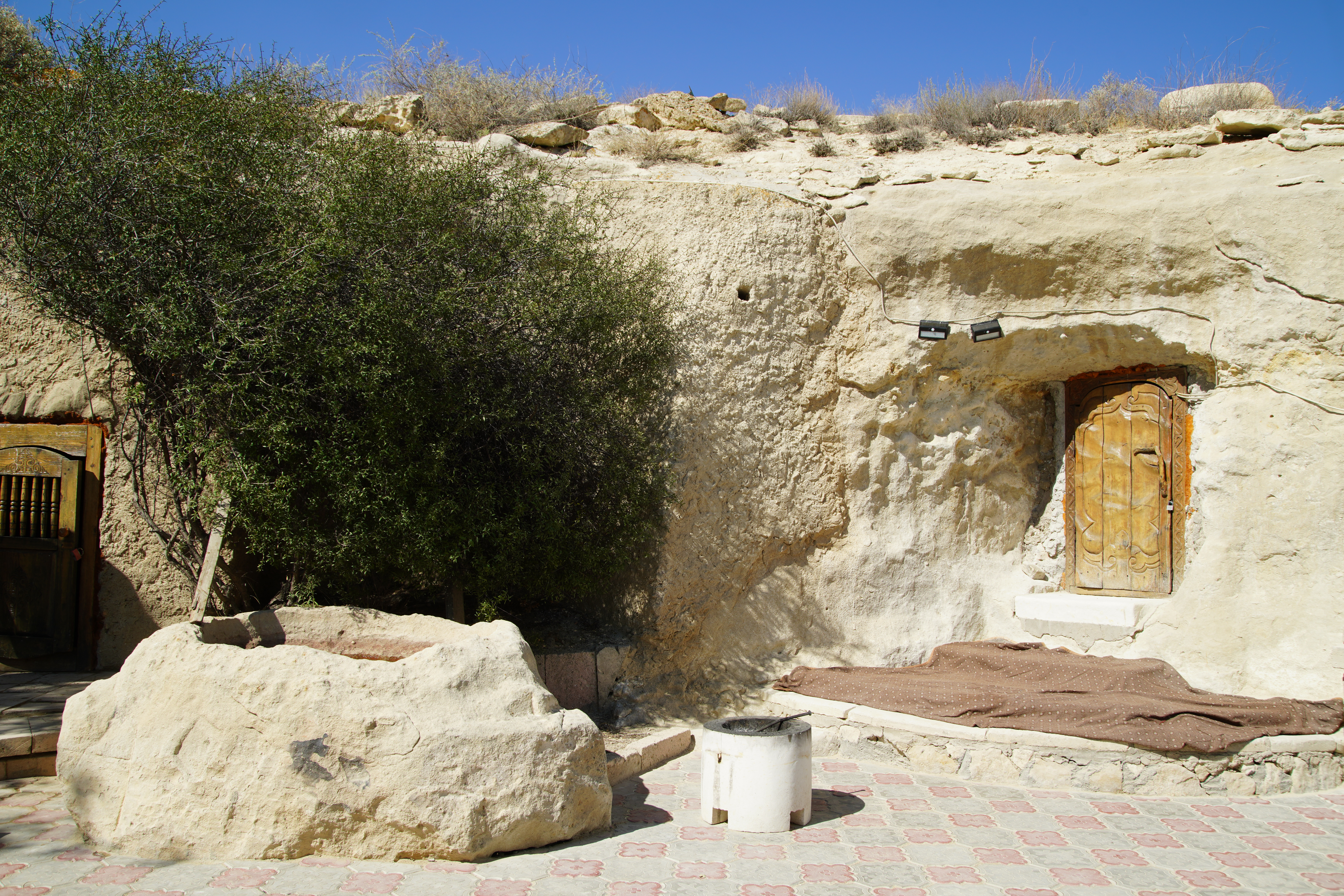
Shopan Ata Necropolis and Underground Mosque in Mangystau Region

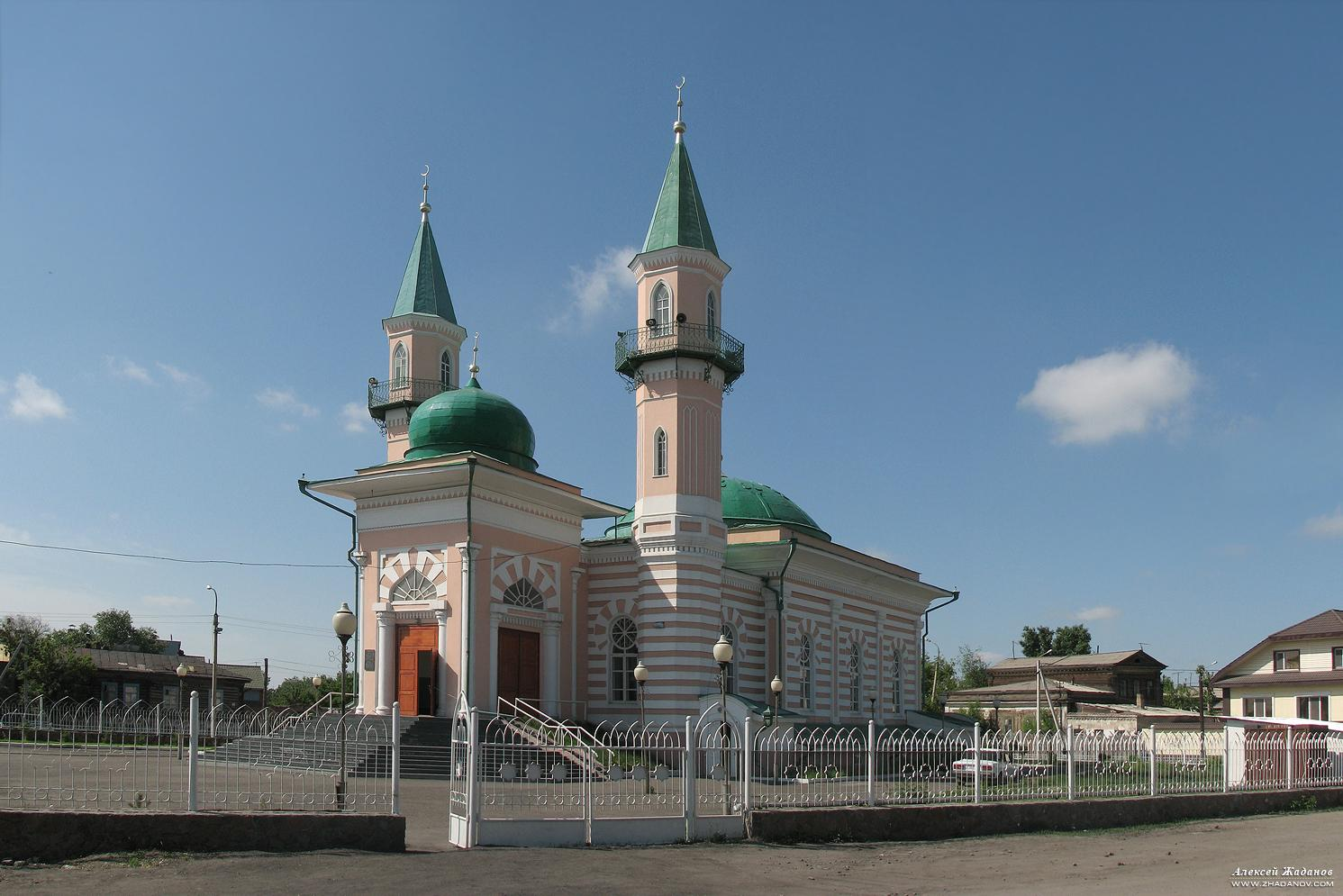
Two—minaret cathedral mosque of Semey (1856-1862)

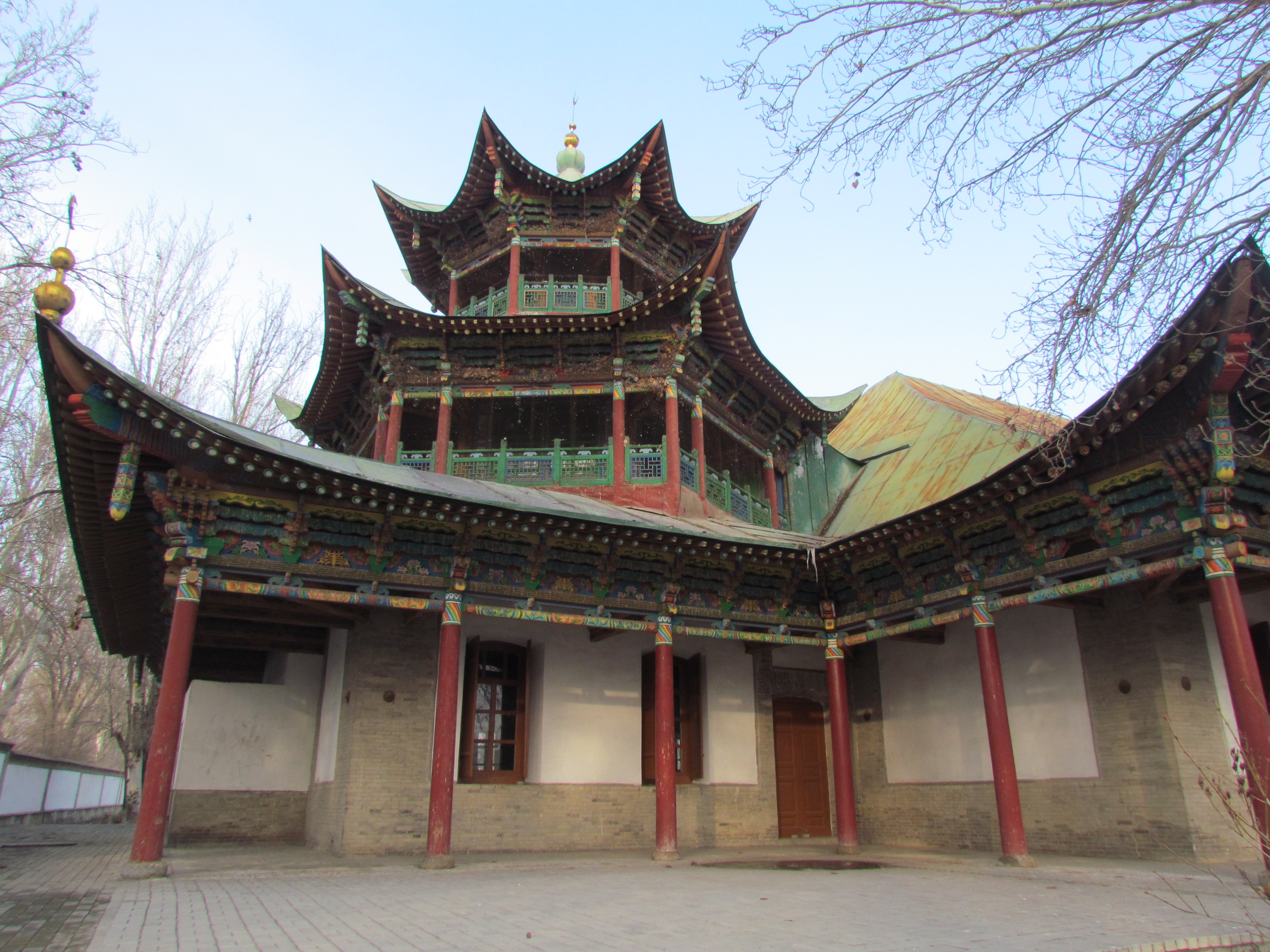
Zharkent Mosque

Central Mosque Almaty

Hazrat Sultan Mosque

Astana Grand Mosque

Nur-Astana Mosque

== See also ==
- Religion in Kazakhstan
- Islam in Central Asia
- Islam in the Soviet Union
- Khoja
- Taza Jol Islam
- Ahmad Yasawi
