= Kokshetau Airport =

International airport serving Kokshetau, Kazakhstan

Kokshetau International Airport Халықаралық Көкшетау Әуежайы
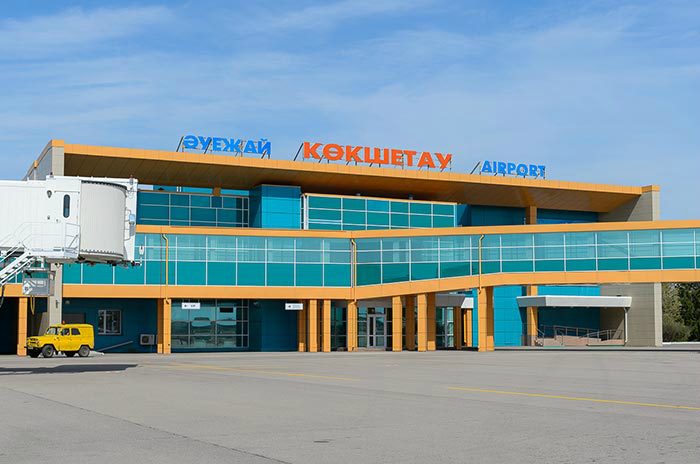
- IATA: KOV; ICAO: UACK; LID: КЧТ; WMO: 28879

Summary
- Airport type: Public
- Owner: Ministry of Industry and Infrastructure Development
- Operator: JSC "Nursultan Nazarbayev International Airport"
- Serves: Kokshetau and Burabay National Park
- Location: 8.1 NM (15.0 km; 9.3 mi) NE of Kokshetau, Akmola Region, Kazakhstan (inside city limits)
- Opened: 1945; 81 years ago
- Hub for: Air Kokshetau (defunct)
- Time zone: ALMT (UTC+06:00)
- Elevation AMSL: 271 m / 888 ft
- Coordinates: 53°19′48″N 069°35′48″E

Maps
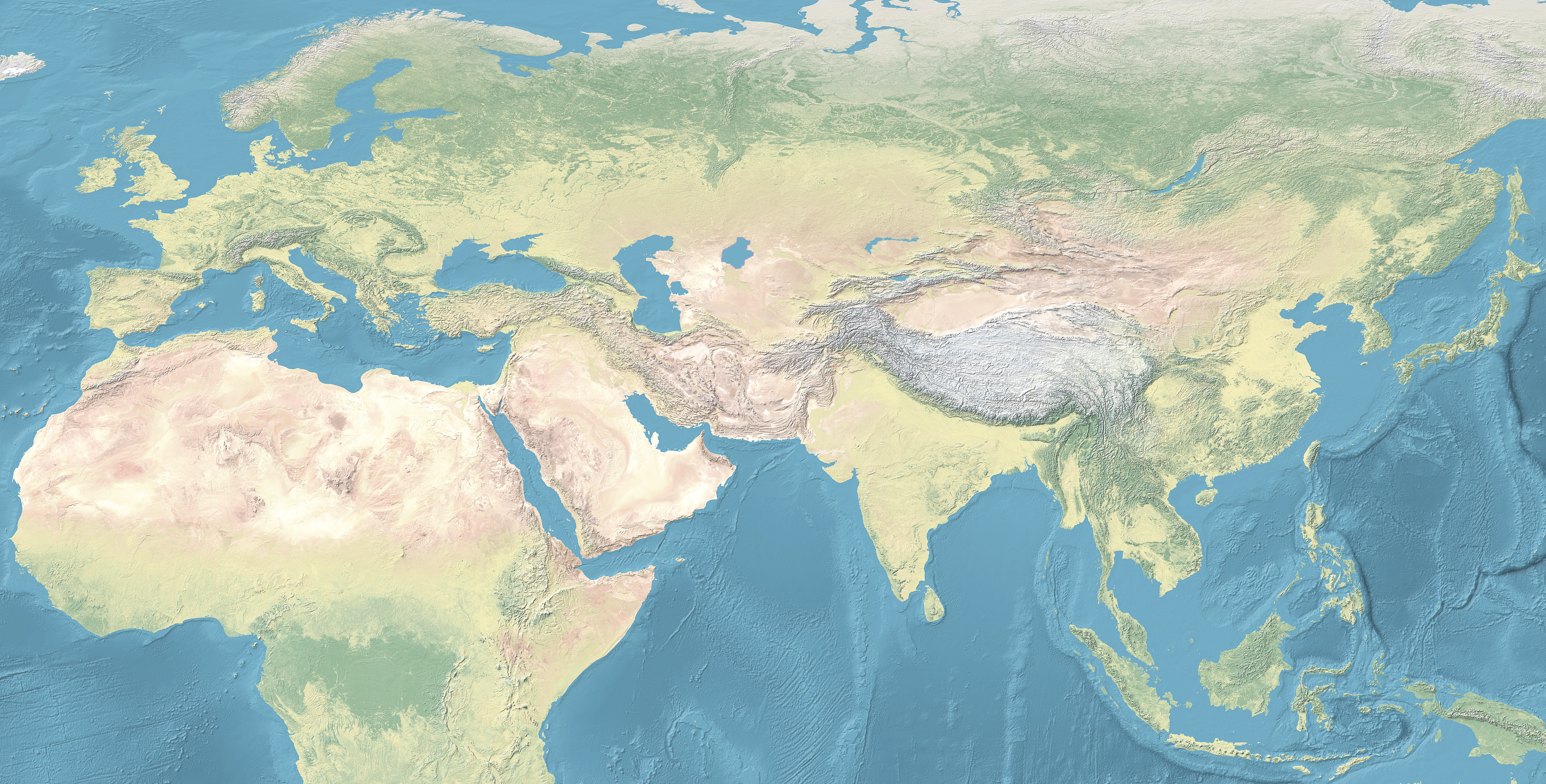
- Location of the airport in Kazakhstan KOV/UACK (Asia) KOV/UACK (Eurasia)
- Interactive map of Kokshetau International Airport

Runways
Direction	Length		Surface
Direction	m	ft	Surface
02/20	2,850	9,350	Concrete/asphalt

Statistics (2020)
- Passengers: 11,877
- Passenger change 19–20: ▼45.2%
- Source: AIP Kazakhstan

Kokshetau International Airport (Note: Kazakh: Халықаралық Көкшетау Әуежайы, romanized: Halyqaralyq Kökşetau Äuejaıy; Russian: Междунаро́дный аэропо́рт Кокшета́у.) (IATA: KOV, ICAO: UACK) is an international airport in Akmola Region, Kazakhstan. It is the primary international airport serving Kokshetau, and also the nearest to the Burabay National Park and Kokshetau National Park.

Opened in 1945, it is the seventeenth-busiest airport in terms of passenger traffic in Kazakhstan, with 21,683 annual passengers as of 2019. The airport is located 8.1 NM (15.0 km; 9.3 mi) north-east from the centre of Kokshetau, the capital of Akmola Region in the northern part of Kazakhstan.

The airport began its new operational phase on 21 October 2013, with new building and runway structure, replacing old structure on the same site. The airport features one fully reconstructed passenger terminal and one runway, which handles both domestic and international operations. The airport is served year-round by Qazaq Air and SCAT Airlines, and was formerly a hub for Air Kokshetau operations which was also headquartered in the city.

The main route is the service to Almaty, operated by Qazaq Air. The airport is managed by JSC "Nursultan Nazarbayev International Airport", a government-owned corporation that manages Astana Airport. The facility opened in 1945; 81 years ago as Kokchetav Airport (the airport's current IATA code, KOV, is derived from the city's previous name of Kokchetav).

== Location ==
Kokshetau International Airport is 8.1 NM (15.0 km; 9.3 mi) north-east of Kokshetau city centre. The airport is approximately 195 kilometres (121 mi) away from Petropavl and 295 kilometres (183 mi) from Astana. It is bordered by the village of Kyzyltan to the east, Myrzakolsor lake to the north, Stantsyonny village to the west, and the village of Akkol to the south. It is primarily served by the National Road A13, however it is also accessible via the nearby A1 or A343 motorways.

== History ==
=== Construction and early operations ===
The airport was constructed as a replacement for the former Kokshetau Airport that was located to the north of the city as a small grass airfield with a relatively short runway. The facility opened in 1945; 81 years ago and was formerly known as Kokchetav Airport, Kokshetau was known as Kokchetav at the time. It was renamed Kokshetau Airport in 1993; "International" was added to the name in 2013. In 1960, Aeroflot was flying daily Ilyushin Il-12 jet service on a round trip routing of Alma-Ata (now Almaty) – Balkhash – Karaganda – Akmolinsk (now Astana) – Kokchetav (now Kokshetau) – Sverdlovsk (now Yekaterinburg).

Also in 1963/1964, Aeroflot was operating 761 service on a round trip routing of Karaganda – Tselinograd (now Astana) – Kokchetav – Kustanai (now Kostanay) – Chelyabinsk – Sverdlovsk (now Yekaterinburg) with Lisunov Li-2 aircraft. Aeroflot served the airport during the mid 1964s with Ilyushin Il-14 aircraft flying a routing of Sverdlovsk (now Yekaterinburg) – Kurgan – Petropavlovsk (now Petropavl) – Kokchetav – Tselinograd – Karaganda – Alma-Ata. In 1961, Aeroflot had service to Moscow via stops at Petropavlovsk, Kurgan, Sverdlovsk, Kazan flying an Ilyushin Il-14 (with total flight time of about 15 hrs.). In the early 1980s, the airfield was one of the reserve landing sites for the reusable low Earth orbital spacecraft system Buran.

=== Development since the 2000s ===
Kokshetau Airport served as a hub for Air Kokshetau from 2002 to 2008. In 2004, Aero Flight, a German airline, was operating international non-stop seasonal service between June and August from Frankfurt (IATA: FRA), Germany to Kokshetau. In 2010, the airport underwent major reconstruction, including reconstruction of the passenger terminal building and modernization of the runway. Renovation and modernization of the airport was completed in 2013. The new passenger terminal opened on October 21, 2013, and was also granted an international status.

The first new airline to start international scheduled flights after the comprehensive reconstruction of the runway and passenger terminal from Kokshetau was Transaero operating Boeing 737-700 jets between Kokshetau and Moscow—Vnukovo (IATA: VKO), Russia. This flight was discontinued for summer 2016 season, as Transaero filed for bankruptcy. In 2017, as a consequence of the collapse of Transaero, S7 Airlines resumed nonstop flights to Moscow and operated a flight between Kokshetau and Moscow—Domodedovo (IATA: DME), Russia, using the Airbus A319-100 narrow body jetliners once a week for summer season. This lasted until September 2018, when S7 Airlines cancelled the flight. In late-May 2019, IrAero resumed summer season service to Moscow and operated a flight to Moscow—Zhukovsky (IATA: ZIA), Russia on the Sukhoi Superjet 100 aircraft On 12 March 2020, FlyArystan launched three weekly flights to its hub at Almaty using Airbus A320-200 aircraft. On 22 July 2021, SCAT Airlines introduced thrice-weekly subsidized inter-republican air services to Hazret Sultan International Airport in Turkistan Region.

== Facilities ==
The airport was the primary hub of Air Kokshetau. It has one passenger terminal. In 2018, it served 21,427 passengers, a decrease of 2.7% compared to 2017, making it the seventeenth-busiest airport in Kazakhstan. The busiest single destination in passenger numbers is Almaty.

=== Runway ===
The airport resides at an elevation of 271 m (889 ft) above mean sea level. The airport has a single active runway in use designated 02/20 with an asphalt/concrete surface measuring 2,850 m × 45 m (9,350 ft × 148 ft). The airport is equipped with a Category I (both directions) Instrument Landing System (ILS) approach to guide landing aircraft safely under very poor weather conditions and also allowing planes to land in low visibility conditions, such as fog. The airport is able to accommodate jets the size of the Il-76, Boeing 747. It can also accept light aircraft and helicopters of all types. However, smaller jets like the Airbus A319-100, Airbus A320-200, Boeing 737-500 and CRJ-200 are more commonly seen there.

Runway at Kokshetau International Airport
Direction	Length	Width	Surface	Operational years	Last major improvement	Usage	ILS	Notes
02/20	9,350 ft 2,850 m	149 ft 45 m	Concrete/asphalt	1945 - Current	2013	Primary runway	Cat. I (both directions)	The new extended runway is 2,850 metres long, with supporting taxiway systems. The runway is dedicated for arrivals and departures.

== Terminal ==
Passenger terminal
Terminal	Opened	Floor area	Handling capacity	Parking bays
International passenger terminal	1945; 81 years ago	8,551.6 m2	200 passengers per hour	2 (aerobridge); 6 (remote)
VIP/CIP	21 October 2013; 12 years ago	N/A	N/A	N/A

The airport features a single, two-storey passenger terminal building that accommodates both domestic and international operations. The main passenger terminal building was built in 1945; 81 years ago, and has been expanded as well as upgraded to modern standards by undergoing comprehensive renovation since its original construction. The renovation project's implementation was started in 2010. The opening ceremony of the upgraded passenger terminal took place on October 21, 2013; 12 years ago, with an area measuring 8,552 square metres (92,050 ft^{2}).

The airport's old and new renovated passenger terminal building were designed by RDSI “KazAeroProject”, a Kazakh research, design and survey institute which also designed Almaty International Airport. The passenger terminal has a capacity of 200 passengers per hour and is equipped with a gallery landing with two gates to air-bridges and six gates to apron buses, 1 escalator and 1 lift.

The first international commercial flight to depart at the new passenger terminal was UN224 to Moscow, Russia at 08:00 am (UTC+6), December 14, 2013, operated by the Russian carrier Transaero. The airport has a VIP area, where travellers for a fee can go through a dedicated security check, wait in the VIP lounge and be transported by car to the aircraft, avoiding mix with non VIP paying passengers. There is Wi-Fi internet access all over the terminal including CIP and VIP zones.

== VIP flights and services ==
Kokshetau International Airport, as the main airport serving Kokshetau, is also used by VIP-flights using business jets. Government officials are frequent visitors. On 25 August 1972, the Soviet party chief Leonid Ilyich Brezhnev visited Kokchetav Airport, where he was met by Dinmukhamed Kunaev. On 28 May 1991, the president Mikhail Sergeyevich Gorbachev visited Kokchetav Airport to assess the agricultural harvest in the former 'Virgin Lands'. On 19 December 2009, the presidents of Armenia, Belarus, Kyrgyzstan, Russia and Tajikistan visited Kokshetau International Airport to attend CIS informal summit in Kokshetau. In October 2015, the President of Russia Vladimir Putin visited Kokshetau International Airport with a couple of large jet airplanes. The then-Prime Minister of Vietnam Nguyen Tan Dung has also visited Kokshetau with his Boeing 777. CIS-meetings and exhibitions in the Burabay area also bring special flights to the airport.

== Expansion and renovation ==
In 2010, the airport underwent major reconstruction, including reconstruction of the passenger terminal building and modernization of the runway. The Kazakhstani Government approved major renovation and refurbishment works to the air-terminal complex as well as a runway expansion project worth 8.3 billion tenge (US$56,290,000). The project saw the runway extended from 2,537 m (8,323 ft) to 2,850 m (9,350 ft) and the size of the main terminal increased to 8,552 m^{2} (92,050 sq ft). It has two jetways for passenger use. The first test flight and landing at the airport took place on December 11, 2011. In 2013, the airport was granted an international status. As a result of this expansion, the airport is capable of handling wide-body aircraft such as the Boeing 767-300 and Boeing 777-300 with no restrictions. However, generally, flights operating into and out of Kokshetau are serviced by narrow-body aircraft.

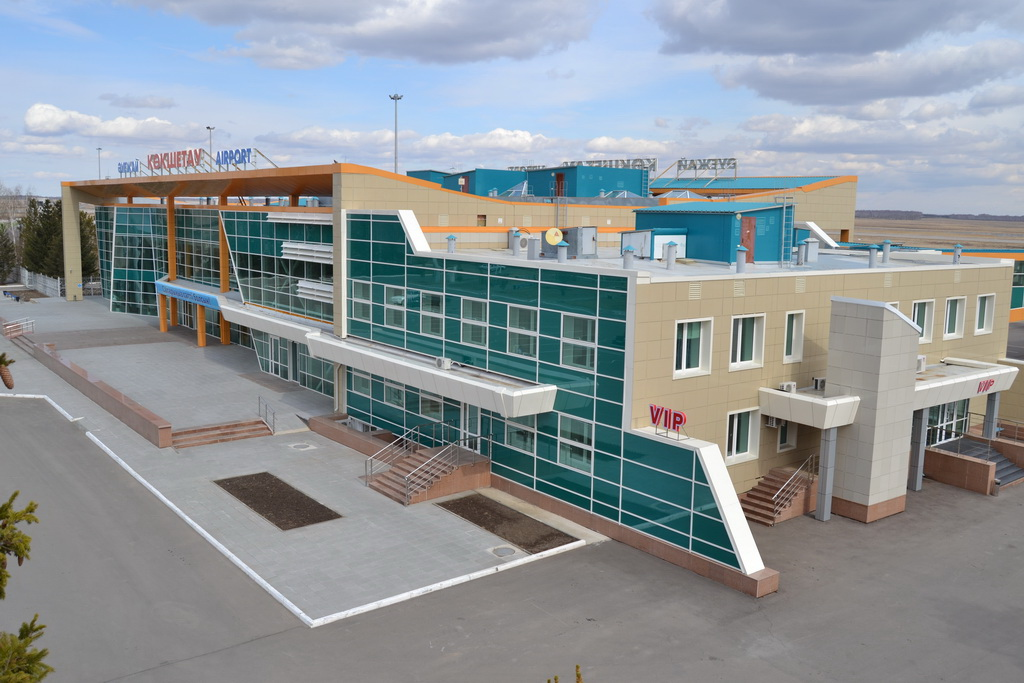
Terminal building exterior, 2015

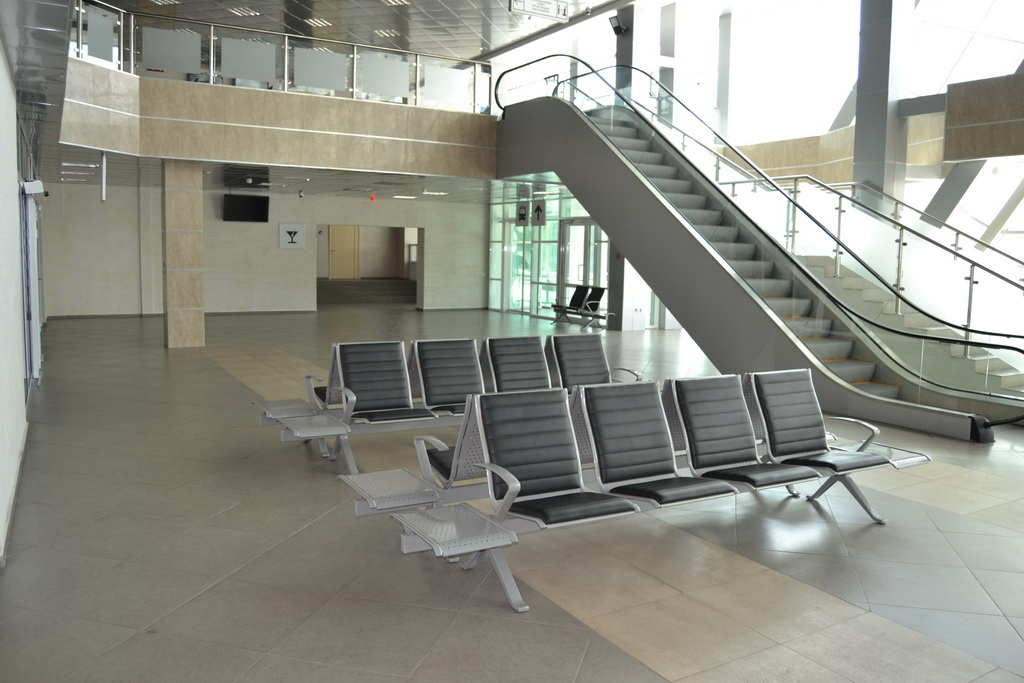
Terminal building interior

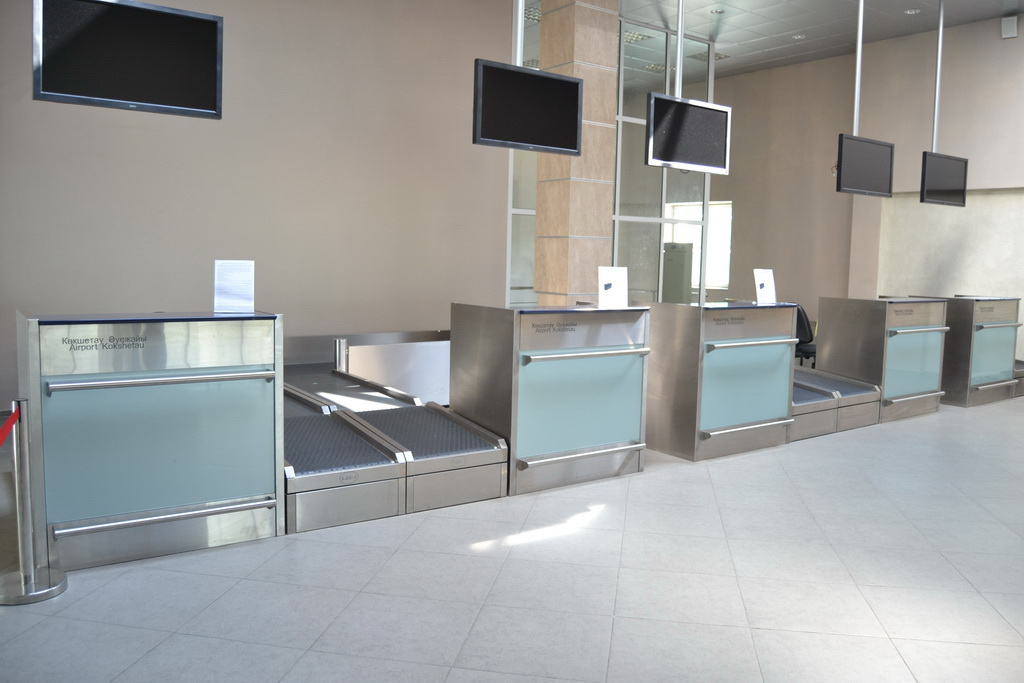
Ground floor check-in

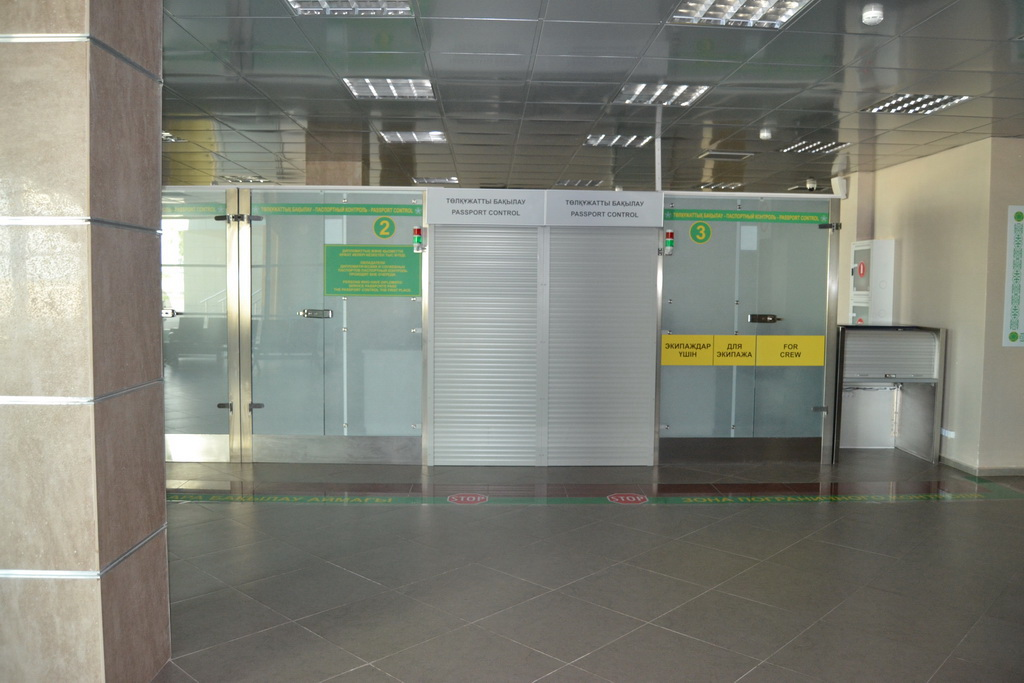
Passport control

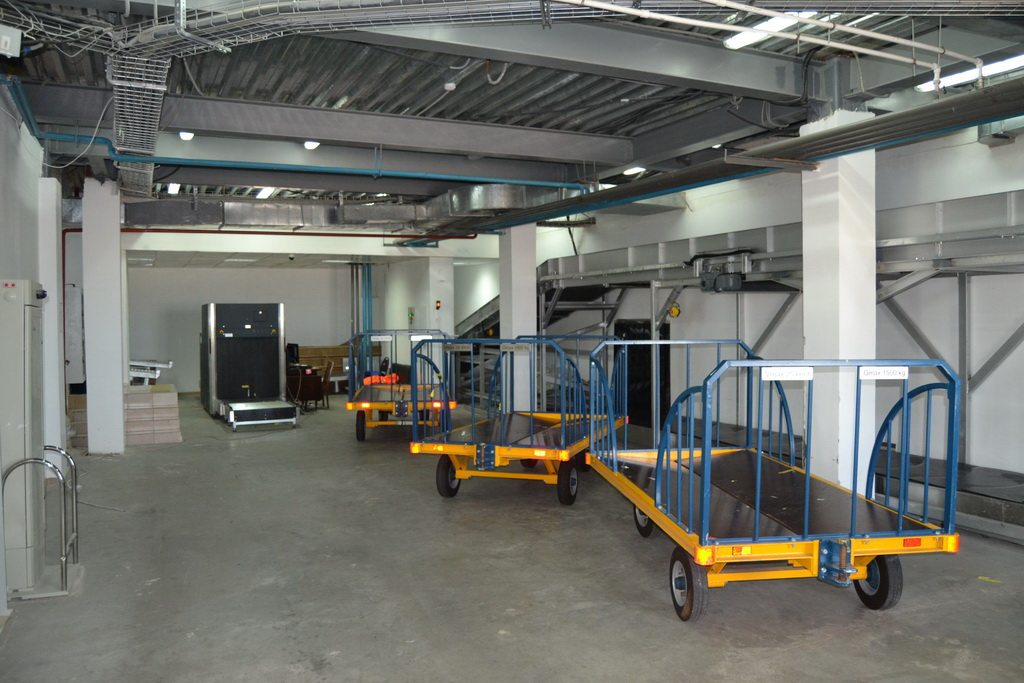
Baggage handling system

== Airlines and destinations ==
The following airlines operate regular scheduled services to and from Kokshetau:

Airlines	Destinations
Qazaq Air	Almaty
SCAT Airlines	Almaty, Aqtau, Şymkent

== Statistics ==
Kokshetau Airport is used by three airlines flying to three destinations in Kazakhstan.

=== Annual traffic ===
In 2021, it served 17,000 passengers, an increase of 43.1% compared to 2020, making it the seventeenth-busiest airport in Kazakhstan.

Annual passenger traffic
Year	2012	2013	2014	2015	2016	2017	2018	2019	2020	2021	2024
Passengers handled (Note: Number of passengers including domestic and international)	2,353	7,401	3,064	17,497	14,213	22,016	21,427	21,683	11,877	17,000	50,010
Passengers handled % change	▲10.1%	▲214.5%	▼58.6%	▲471.1%	▼18.8%	▲15.6%	▼2.7%	▲1.2%	▼45.2%	▲43.1%	
Place in Kazakhstan	19	19	19	17	17	17	17	?	?	?	

== Ground transportation ==
Along with being an alternative option to Nursultan Nazarbayev International Airport, Kokshetau Airport is convenient for the resorts such as Burabay and Zerenda. Kokshetau International Airport is located in the north-east part of Kokshetau, approximately 12.5 km (7.8 mi) from the city centre. There is no direct rail link to Kokshetau city centre, and the public transport options to the city are taxis, buses and private transport.

=== Bus ===
No. 18 municipal bus line connects the airport with the city centre of Kokshetau. Service is available from 06:00 to 22:00 and run from the airport (just outside the airport) to the city center and vice versa with intermediate stops in between. The single fare is 150.

Ground public transportation
Route	Route description	Interval	Stops	Service notes
No. 18	Abay St., Auelbekov St., Nazarbayev St., Road A-343, Road A-13	30–70 minutes	Railway Station, Central Bus Station, Privokzal'naya, Mira, Alatau, Central Market, Burabay, Radiozavod, Yubileynyy, Zvonochek, Vasil'kovskiy, Airport	No late night service

=== Car and taxi ===
- From Kokshetau main access is by A13 Motorway
- From Burabay by A1 Motorway
- From Zerenda by R-214 Motorway

The airport is located on the National Road A13, about 20 kilometers (12 mi) from the city center and about 20 minutes drive, depending on traffic. There is extensive car and motorcycle parking space available. Taxis are also available directly outside the terminal building at the airport parking lot ( Yandex.Taxi and inDriver). Many taxi companies offer a flat-rate for to/from the airport (the rate is usually 1,500), booked via mobile app.

== Accidents and incidents ==
Accidents and incidents
Date	Aircraft	Fatalities	Description of the event	Refs
24 May 1974	Antonov An-2P	15/15	Aeroflot Flight SU476K on a flight from Avangard (now Presnoe) to Kokshetau via Schuchinsk crashed into Mount Kokshe (947 m) six km west of Burabay (village), Akmola Region. All thirteen passengers and two crew were killed.	
29 Jan 2013	Bombardier CRJ-200	21/21	SCAT Airlines Flight 760 crashed near Kyzyltu during a low-visibility final approach to Almaty International Airport (IATA: ALA) 43.40168°N 77.083654°E that originated from Kokshetau (IATA: KOV). All 16 passengers and five crew on board were killed.	

== See also ==
- Transport in Kazakhstan
- List of airports in Kazakhstan
- Nursultan Nazarbayev International Airport (enclosed by the Akmola Region 287 km (178 mi) from Kokshetau)
