= Bidaik =

Land border crossing point between Kazakhstan and Russia

Locaiton
- Country: Kazakhstan
- Location: outside of Bidaik, Ualikhanov District, North Kazakhstan Region
- Coordinates: 54°07′15″N 72°45′58″E

Bidaik (Kazakh: Бидайық, romanized: Bıdaıyq) is a land border crossing point between Kazakhstan and Russia on the Kazakhstan side. It is located near the village of Bidaik, Ualikhanov District, North Kazakhstan Region. The checkpoint/crossing is situated on autoroute ( A 13). Code checkpoint — 35091400

The Russian side is in Odesskoye in Odessky District in Omsk Oblast. There is a border crossing station on the Russian side also, and both have to be passed to enter the opposite country.

== Description ==
Named after village of Bidaik that is located nearby. Across the border on the Russian side is a border checkpoint Odesskoye.

The type of crossing is automobile only, status — international and local. The types of transportation for automobile crossings are passenger and freight.

== Distances from Bidaik ==
- Kokshetau: 267 km
- Omsk: 114 km

== See also ==
- Kazakhstan–Russia border
- A13 highway (Kazakhstan)
