= Church of the Resurrection, Kokshetau =

Church of the Resurrection in Kokshetau
- Mäsıhtıñ qaita tırılu şırkeuı (Kazakh); Храм Воскресе́ния Христо́ва (Russian)
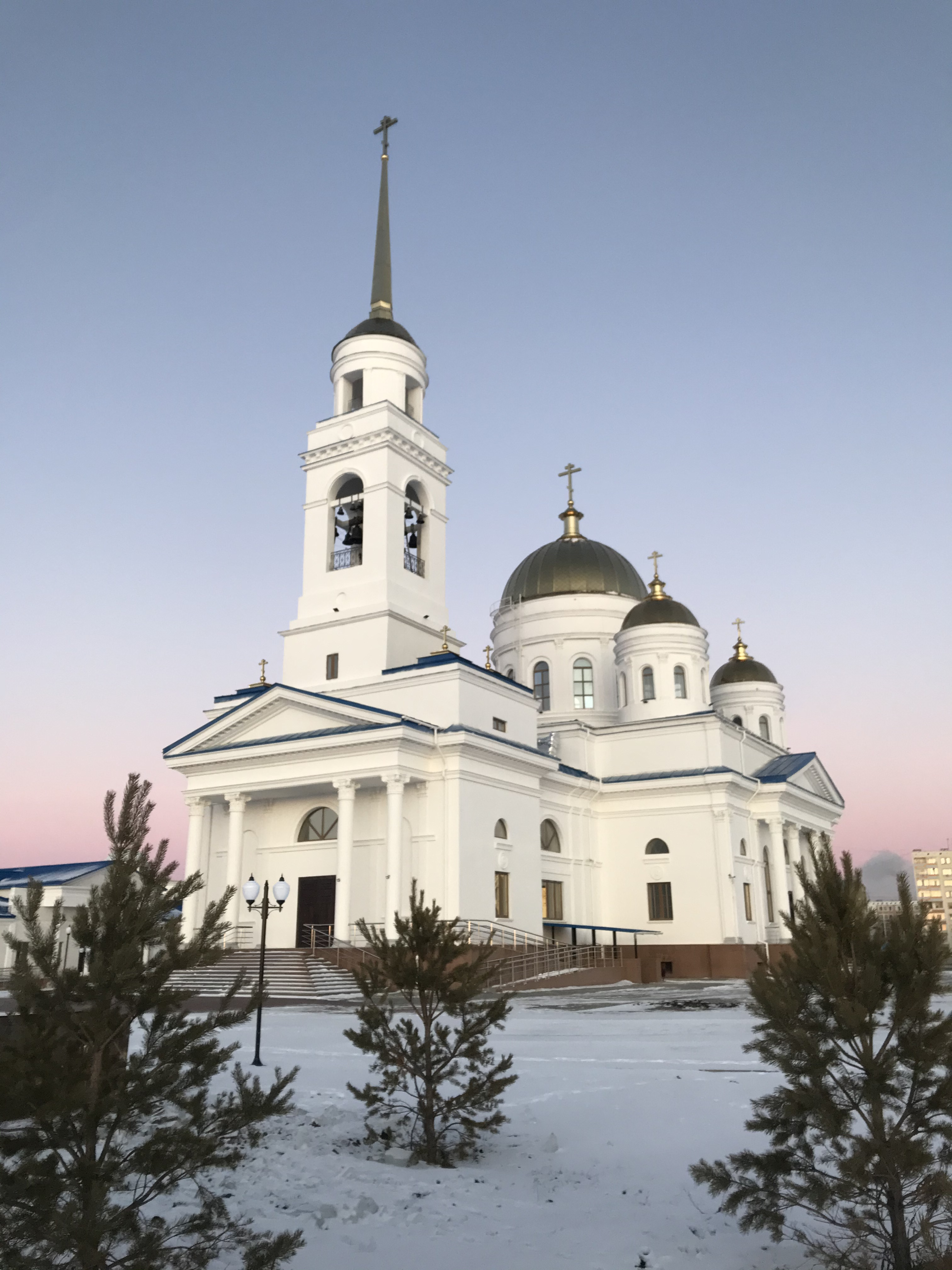
- The church complex of the Resurrection as viewed from the Nazarbayev Ave.
- Church of the Resurrection in Kokshetau
- 53.2988°N 69.3812°E
- Location: Nazarbayev Avenue, 71 (020000), Kokshetau
- Country: Kazakhstan
- Denomination: Russian Orthodox
- Website: www.pravest-kokshe.kz

History
- Status: Parish church
- Dedication: Feast of the Resurrection
- Consecrated: 2 December 2020

Architecture
- Architect(s): Belik D.L., Matskovyak V.G.
- Style: Neoclassicism
- Groundbreaking: 21 November 2015
- Completed: Between 2015 and 2020

Specifications
- Capacity: 500 people (max. 1,500 people)

The Church of the Resurrection (Kazakh: Мәсіхтің қайта тірілу шіркеуі, romanized: Mäsıhtıñ qaita tırılu şırkeuı; Russian: Храм Воскресе́ния Христо́ва, or Khram Voskreseniya Khristova) is a Russian Orthodox cathedral located on the coast of Lake Kopa in Kokshetau, the capital of Akmola Region in the northern part of Kazakhstan. It serves as the main temple of Kokshetau Deanery of Russian Orthodox Church (ROC).

The church was constructed between 2015 and 2020, with the design of architects Belik D.L. and Matskovyak V.G, consecrated in 2020. It is dedicated to the Feast of the Resurrection and is located at Nazarbayev Avenue, 71 (formerly Gorky Street); 020000; near Kylshakty river. The capacity exceeds 500 persons. The parish activities also include a Sunday school. The church is built in the neoclassical style.

== History ==
The Church of the Resurrection in Kokshetau was founded in 2015. On 21 November 2015, Metropolitan of Astana and Kazakhstan Alexander (Mogilev) consecrated a place for the construction of the church in Kokshetau.

The construction was carried out on a site assigned by the city authorities in a new micro-district on the coast of Lake Kopa. Construction of the foundation began on 12 April 2016. The dome was installed on the building in March 2017. It was built from 2015 to 2020 by the architects Belik D.L. and Matskovyak V.G.

=== Consecration ===
On 2 December 2020, on the day of the commemoration of St. Philaret of Moscow, the cathedral was consecrated by the Metropolitan of Astana and Kazakhstan Alexander (Mogilev) by the brief rite. The construction was financed by donations from companies, institutions and individuals. The total cost of the project is 1.5 billion tenge.

== Description ==
The cathedral is located in the northern part of Kokshetau on the shores of Lake Kopa. It was built in the style of Russian church architecture of the 19th century. It offers space for up to 1,500 people.

The floor plan of the nave is square, on the eastern side there is a bell tower that is connected to the nave. On the nave there are rotundas at the four corners, which are decorated with a golden dome. Each of these rotundas has eight windows. In the middle is the central dome, which is also located on a rotunda with twelve windows.

All pillars between the windows of the rotunda are adorned with flat Corinthian pilasters. The bell tower begins at the height of the eaves and is also square with a round part at the top. The top is a dome with a golden tip.

In the bell tower, there are twelve bells that were cast in Tutayev (Yaroslavl Oblast, Russian Federation). The bells were consecrated on April 9, 2017, and were placed in the bell tower over the next two days.

=== Dimensions ===
Design characteristics

- Area — 1386 m ^{2};
- Capacity — 500 people (max. 1,500 people);
- The height of the dome with the cross is 46 m, the length is 46 m and the width is 28.4 m.

There is also a Sunday school next to the cathedral with a total area of 811 m ^{2}.

== See also ==
- St George's Church, Kokshetau
- Eastern Orthodoxy in Kazakhstan
