= Odessky =

Odessky (masculine), Odesskaya (feminine), or Odesskoye (neuter) may refer to:

- Odessky District, a district of Omsk Oblast, Russia
- Odesskoye, a rural locality (a selo) in Odessky District of Omsk Oblast, Russia
