= SCAT Airlines Flight 760 =

2013 plane crash near Almaty, Kazakhstan

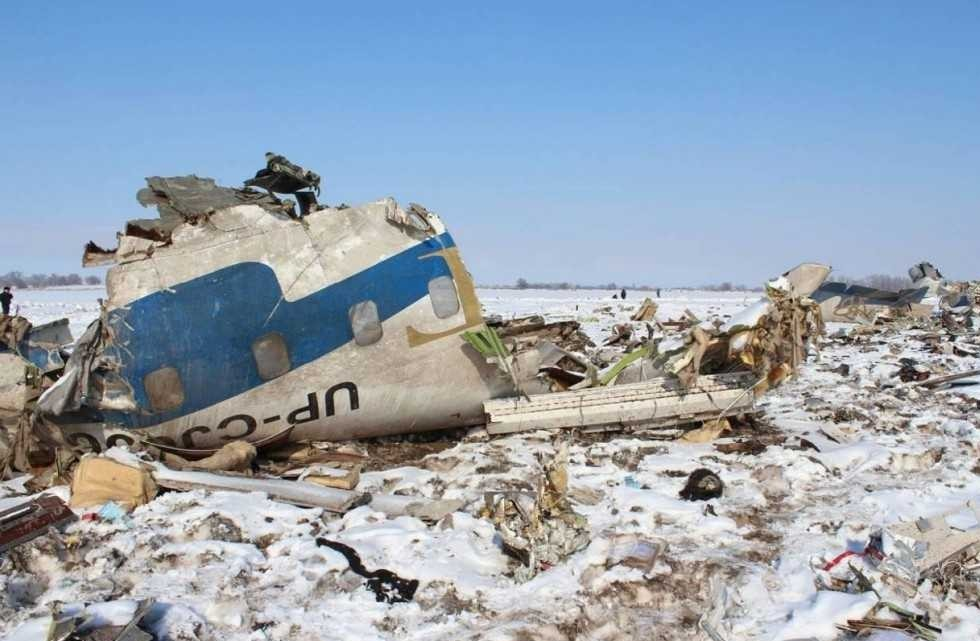
- The wreckage of the aircraft

Accident
- Date: 29 January 2013
- Summary: Crashed during go-around; cause undetermined
- Site: Kyzyltu, Almaty Region, near Almaty International Airport, Kazakhstan; 43°22′41″N 77°05′13″E

Aircraft
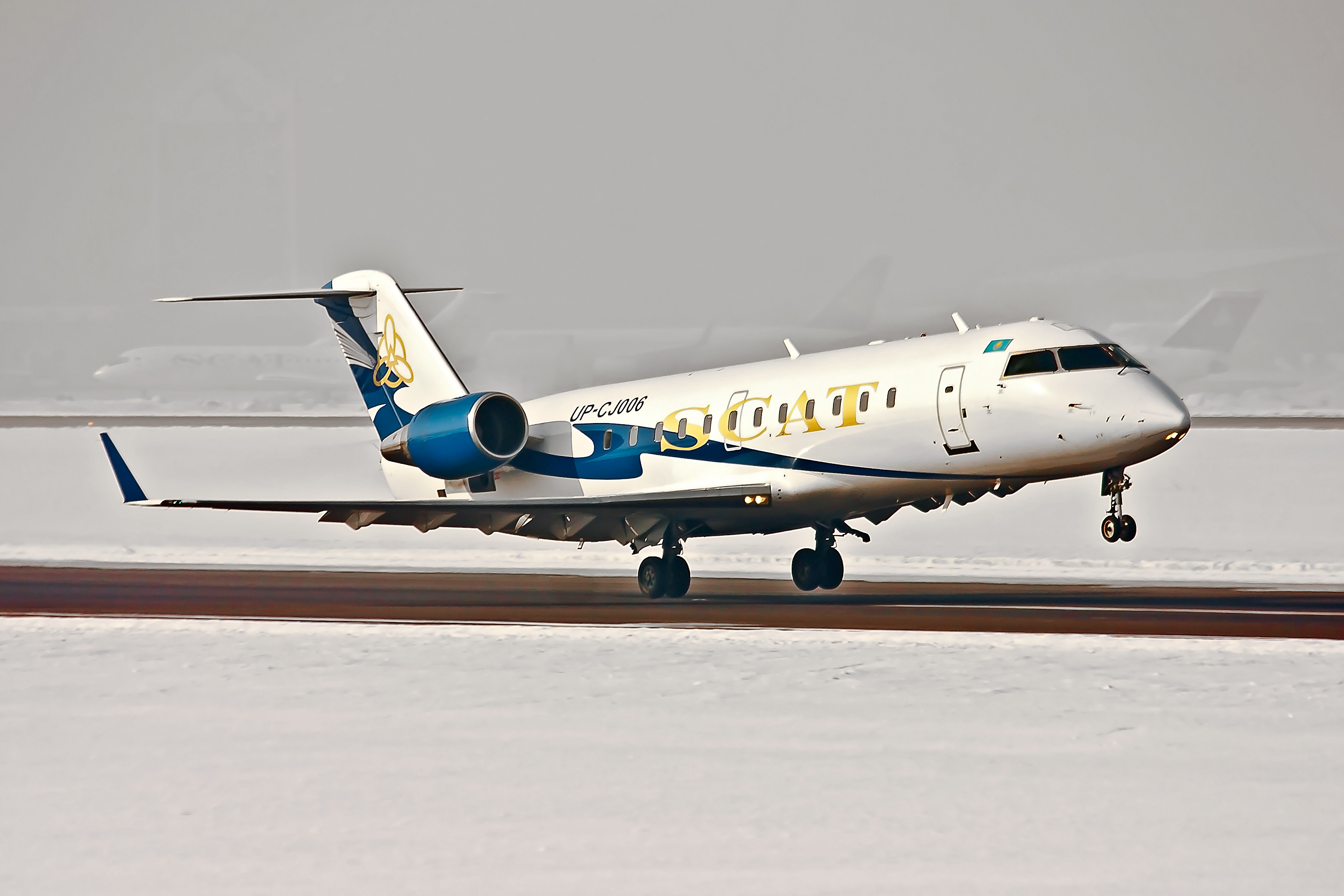
- UP-CJ006, the aircraft involved in the crash, at Almaty Airport three weeks before the accident
- Aircraft type: Bombardier CRJ200
- Operator: SCAT Airlines
- IATA flight No.: DV760
- ICAO flight No.: VSV760
- Call sign: VLASTA 760
- Registration: UP-CJ006
- Flight origin: Kokshetau Airport
- Destination: Almaty International Airport
- Occupants: 21
- Passengers: 16
- Crew: 5
- Fatalities: 21
- Survivors: 0

SCAT Airlines Flight 760 was a scheduled domestic passenger flight from Kokshetau to Almaty, Kazakhstan, operated by a Bombardier CRJ200 twinjet that on 29 January 2013 crashed in thick fog near the village of Kyzyltu, while on approach to Almaty. All 16 passengers and 5 crew on board were killed.

The subsequent investigation determined that the aircraft had descended abruptly after pitching nose-down, but was unable to establish the cause of the sudden manoeuvre.

== Aircraft, passengers and crew ==
The aircraft involved was a Bombardier CRJ200 registered as UP-CJ006 with serial number 7413. The aircraft was powered by two General Electric CF34-3B1 engines. SCAT Airlines had operated the aircraft since 22 September 2012.

The aircraft was carrying 16 passengers and 5 crew members. The passenger manifest released by SCAT Airlines indicated all on board were Kazakhs.

The captain was 55-year-old Vladimir Nikolaevich Evdokimov, who had been working for SCAT Airlines since 2001 and had logged 18,194 flight hours, including 1,227 hours on the CRJ200. The first officer was 43-year-old Alexander Vladimirovich Sharapov, who had been with the airline since 2006 and had 3,507 flight hours, with 132 of them on the CRJ200.

== Accident ==
The airliner operating the flight was on final approach to Almaty International Airport in thick fog and poor visibility when it crashed 1.6 km (1 mi; 0.9 nmi) short of the runway near the village of Kyzyltu at 13:13 local time (07:13 UTC), 14 seconds after initiating a go-around. All 16 passengers and 5 crew members aboard were killed.

According to the deputy head of Almaty's emergencies department, "there was no fire, no explosion. The plane just plunged to the earth."

== Investigation ==
Shortly after the accident, a commission headed by Bakytzhan Sagintayev, the first deputy prime minister of Kazakhstan, was set up by Prime Minister Serik Akhmetov to investigate the cause of the crash.

Maulen Mukashev, the deputy mayor of Almaty, visited the crash site and told reporters that the preliminary cause of the crash was bad weather. Mukashev also added: "Not a single part of the plane was left intact after it came down."

On 2 March 2015, the Interstate Aviation Committee (IAC) released their final report, stating that during the missed approach procedure, initiated due to weather conditions being below minimal, a nose-down elevator deflection was recorded, resulting in a steep dive and impact with the ground. The investigation was unable to determine the cause of the elevator deflection, but did not find evidence of any system malfunction or external factors.

However, the IAC's final report did state a possible scenario that could have led to the elevator deflection; Captain Evdokimov (who was the pilot flying) may have experienced a heart attack during the go-around (the final report noted that a postaccident autopsy on Evdokimov revealed that he had coronary artery disease), becoming incapacitated and collapsing onto the yoke, pushing the aircraft's nose down. The scenario also stated that First Officer Sharapov was focusing on radio communications during the upset until the enhanced ground proximity warning system activated.

== See also ==
- 2012 Kazakhstan Antonov An-72 crash
