= Kalibek =

Saltlake in Kazakhstan

- Қалыбек / Калибек
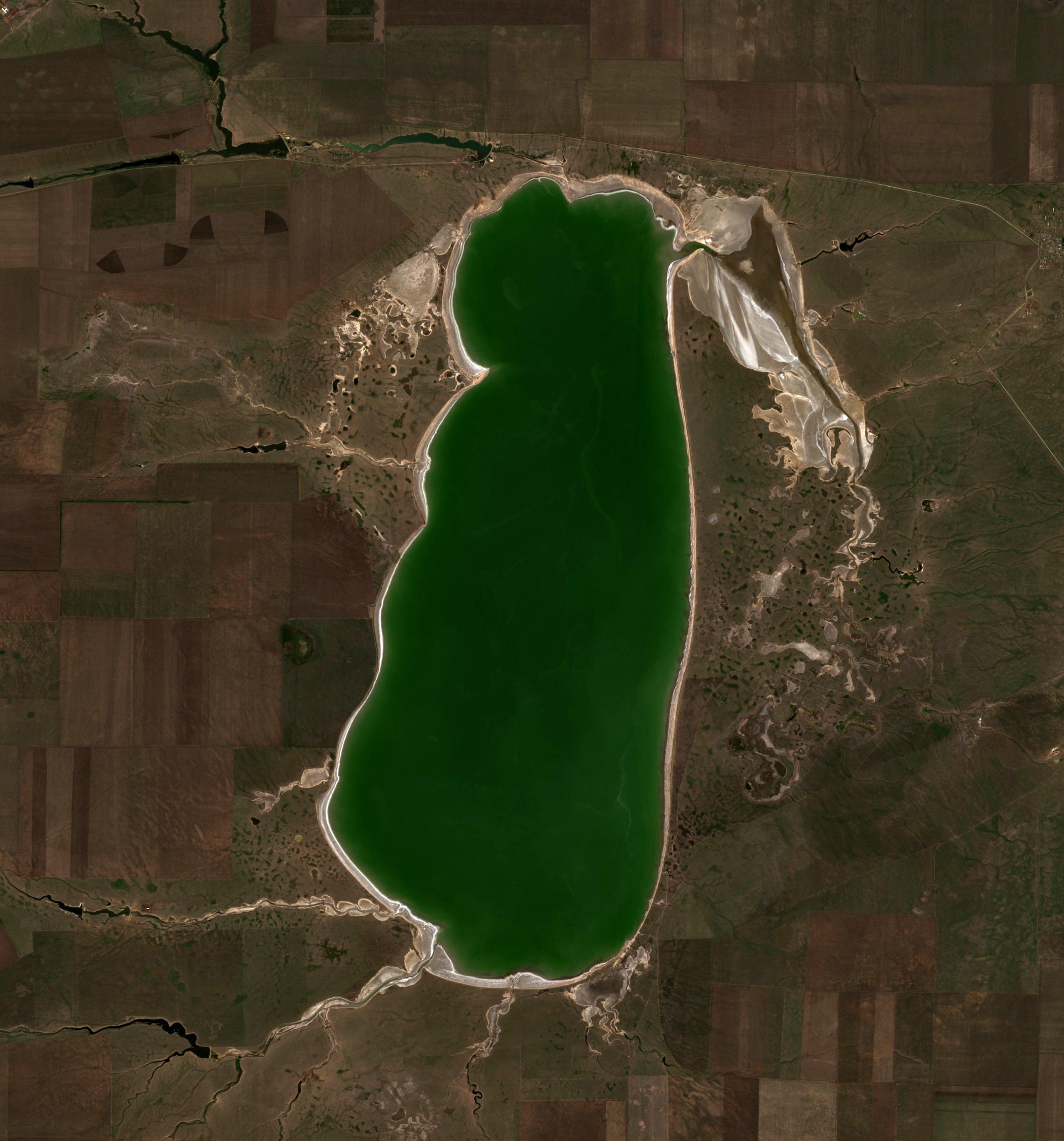
- 2021 Sentinel-2 image of the lake in June

- Location within Kazakhstan
- Location: Ishim Plain; West Siberian Plain
- Coordinates: 53°52′N 70°37′E
- Type: endorheic
- Catchment area: 2,660 square kilometers (1,030 sq mi)
- Basin countries: Kazakhstan
- Max. length: 17 kilometers (11 mi)
- Max. width: 7.3 kilometers (4.5 mi)
- Surface area: 110 square kilometers (42 sq mi)
- Max. depth: 2 meters (6 ft 7 in)
- Water volume: 0.6 cubic kilometers (0.14 cu mi)
- Residence time: UTC+6
- Shore length^{1}: 70 kilometers (43 mi)
- Surface elevation: 85.6 meters (281 ft)
- ^{1} Shore length is not a well-defined measure.

Kalibek (Kazakh: Қалыбек; Russian: Калибек) is a bittern salt lake in Taiynsha District, North Kazakhstan Region, Kazakhstan.

Taiynsha town, the administrative center of the district, lies 45 kilometers (28 mi) to the west of the lake.

== Geography ==
Kalibek lies in the southern part of the Ishim Plain, southwest of the Russian border. It is an endorheic lake located in a depression between Shaglyteniz to the west and Kishi-Karoy to the east. Alabota lake lies 8 kilometers (5.0 mi) to the ESE. Kalibek is fed mainly by snow and rain. The lake bottom is clayey and its shores are low and gently-sloping. Its surface greatly decreases after the spring floods.

A number of intermittent small streams flow into the lakeshore, the two main ones from the southwest. Ushsay, a small, narrow lake located in the northeast, is connected to Kalibek by a channel. Formerly there was exploitation of salt for commercial purposes at the lake.

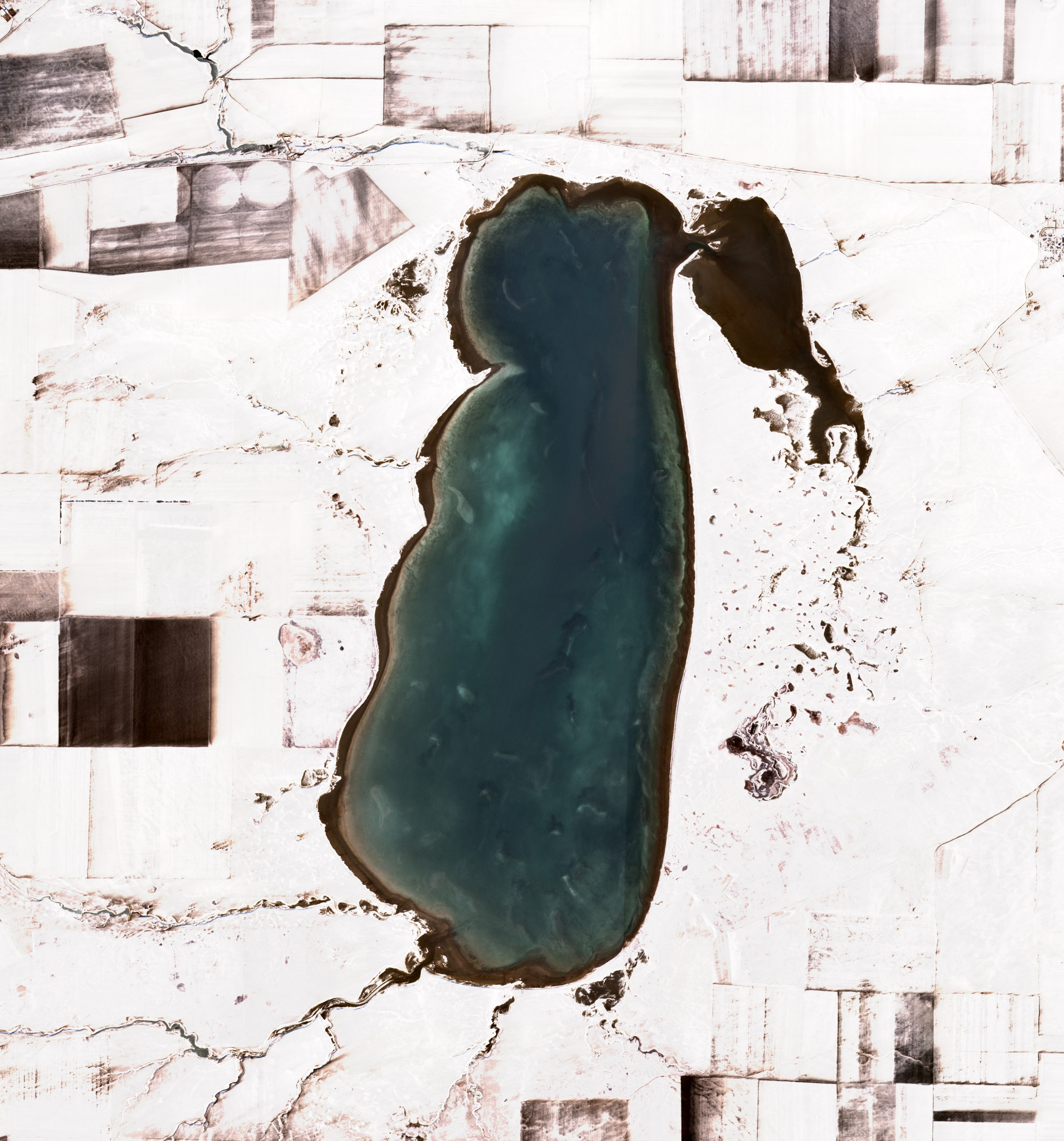
2021 Sentinel-2 image of the lake in December.

== See also ==
- List of lakes of Kazakhstan
