= Bukpa =

Bukpa (Kazakh: Buqpa / [bʊqpɑ] / — «To Hide») may refer to:

- Bukpa Hill, hill (363 m) in Kokshetau, Akmola Region, Kazakhstan
- Bukpa (river), a river in Kazakhstan
- Bukpa (newspaper), Bukpa is a regional newspaper in Kokshetau, published since 2001
