= Zhamantuz, Taiynsha District =

Lake in Kazakhstan

Zhamantuz
- Жамантұз
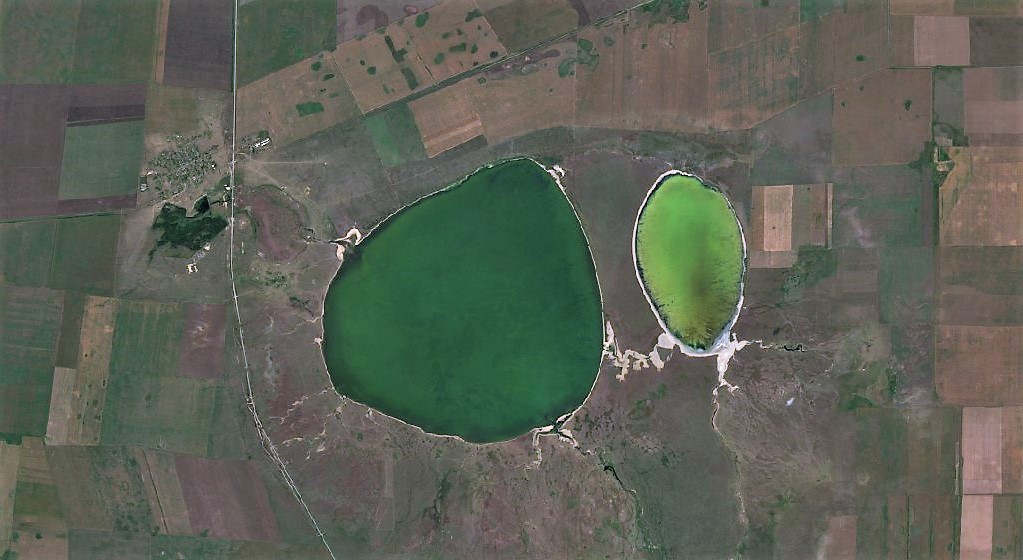
- Sentinel-2 picture of lakes Zhamantuz (left) and Kishkenesor (right).

- Location within Kazakhstan
- Location: Ishim Plain
- Coordinates: 54°01′50″N 69°14′33″E
- Type: endorheic lake
- Basin countries: Kazakhstan
- Max. length: 16.5 kilometers (10.3 mi)
- Max. width: 6.4 kilometers (4.0 mi)
- Surface area: 29.6 square kilometers (11.4 sq mi)
- Residence time: UTC+6:00
- Shore length^{1}: 20 kilometers (12 mi)
- Surface elevation: 118.7 meters (389 ft)
- Islands: none
- ^{1} Shore length is not a well-defined measure.

Zhamantuz (Kazakh: Жамантұз) is a salt lake in the Taiynsha District, North Kazakhstan Region, Kazakhstan. The A1 highway passes 1 kilometer (0.62 mi) to the west of the western edge of the lake.

The lake lies 3 kilometers (1.9 mi) to the southeast of Roshchinskoye village. The area surrounding Zhamantuz is used for livestock grazing. Although the water is salty, in the spring it is suitable for the cattle to drink.

== Geography ==
Zhamantuz is an endorheic lake part of the Ishim river basin. It lies at an elevation of 118 meters (387 ft). Smaller lake Kishkenesor extends to the east of its eastern shore, separated from Zhamantuz by a 0.7 kilometers (0.43 mi) wide strip of land. The southwestern side of larger lake Shaglyteniz lies 30 kilometers (19 mi) further to the east.

The last stretch of the Shagalaly river flows 33 kilometers (21 mi) to the ESE of the eastern side. Lake Zhamantuz freezes in November and stays under ice until April. In years of high spring floods Zhamantuz may merge with neighboring lake Kishkenesor until the flood subsides. The lakeshore is flat and clayey in the southern half of Zhamantuz. Only the northern shore has somewhat steep, cliff-like banks.

== See also ==
- List of lakes of Kazakhstan
