= A13 highway (Kazakhstan) =

Road in Kazakhstan

The A13 highway

The A13 (before 2011 also known as P393) is a national highway in the northern part of Kazakhstan, that connects Kokshetau with Kazakhstan's border with Russia. After crossing the border with Russia, the highway continues to Omsk as P393. The highway is around 278 kilometres (173 mi) long.

Since Soviet times it has sometimes been called Kokshetau — Omsk Highway. Today the highway stretches through two regions and ends at the Bidaik border checkpoint.

== History ==
Until 2011, the A-13 route was designated as P393.

== General data ==
- Length: 278 km (173 mi)

== Route description ==
The A13 would go through the Kokshetau, Akmola and North Kazakhstan regions, running pass the districts of Zerendi, Taiynsha, Akzhar and Ualikhanov (Kishkenekol).

=== Attractions ===
Kokshetau is a city with a population of 146 thousand inhabitants, located on the north of Kokshetau hills, on the southern shores of Lake Kopa and the southern edge of the Esil (Ishim) Steppe.
