= Shaglyteniz =

Lake in Kazakhstan

- Шағалалытеңіз / Шаглытениз
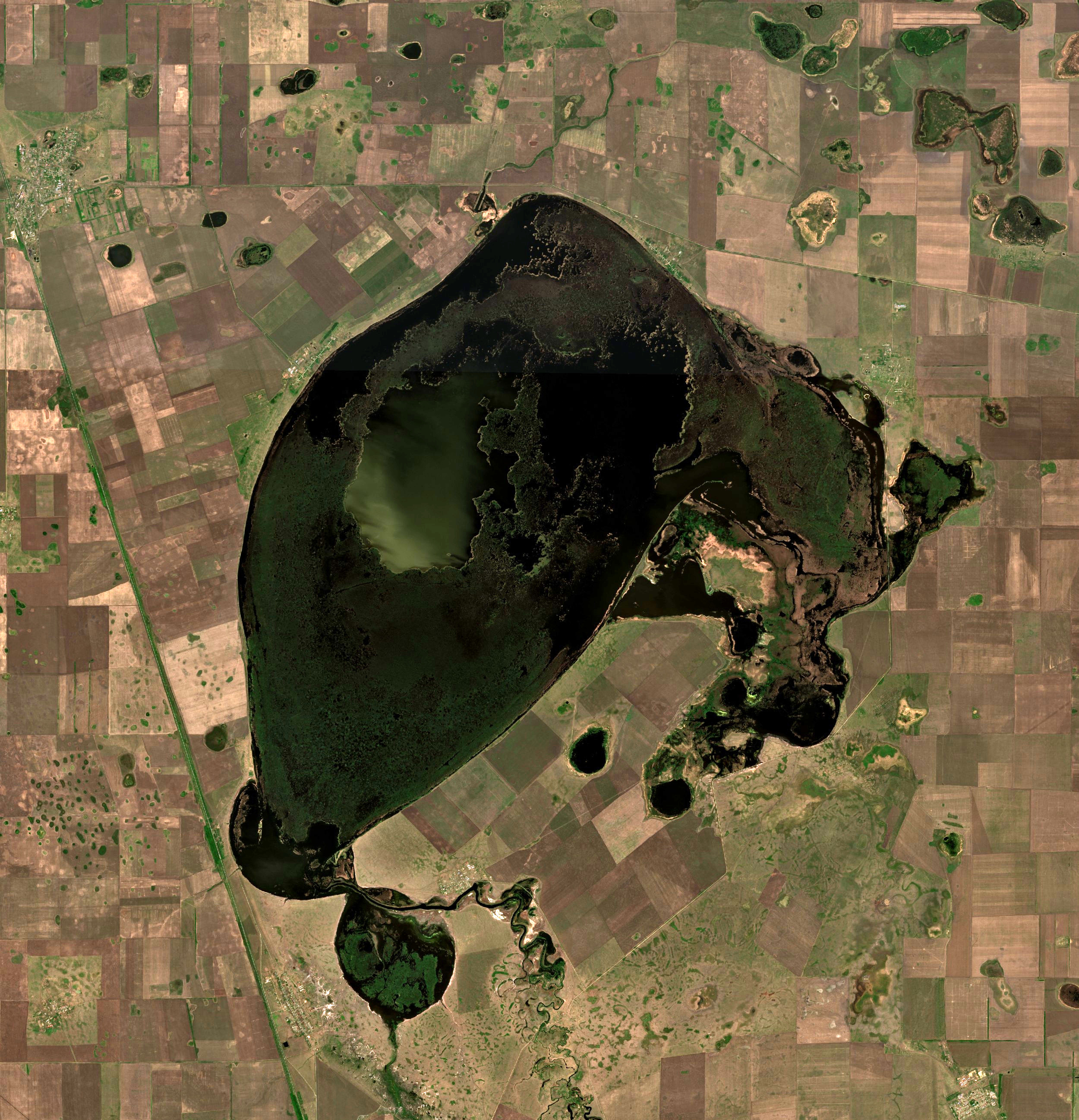
- Sentinel-2 image of the lake in 2021

- Location within Kazakhstan
- Location: Ishim Plain; West Siberian Plain
- Coordinates: 54°06′N 69°51′E
- Type: endorheic
- Primary inflows: Shagalaly
- Catchment area: 4,240 square kilometers (1,640 sq mi)
- Basin countries: Kazakhstan
- Max. length: 42.9 kilometers (26.7 mi)
- Max. width: 12.5 kilometers (7.8 mi)
- Surface area: 267.4 square kilometers (103.2 sq mi)
- Average depth: 1.5 meters (4 ft 11 in)
- Max. depth: 5 meters (16 ft)
- Water volume: 0.6 cubic kilometers (0.14 cu mi)
- Residence time: UTC+6
- Shore length^{1}: 95.8 kilometers (59.5 mi)
- Surface elevation: 135.6 meters (445 ft)
- ^{1} Shore length is not a well-defined measure.

Shaglyteniz or Shagalalyteniz (Kazakh: Шағалалытеңіз; Russian: Шаглытениз) is a lake in Akkayin and Taiynsha districts, North Kazakhstan Region, Kazakhstan.

The villages of Barykol, Kurya, Intally, Elizavetinka and Kuchkovka lie near the lakeshore. Taiynsha town lies 10 kilometers (6.2 mi) to the south of the lake. Road P-249 runs close to the northern end of Shaglyteniz. The lake and its adjacent marshes are an important bird area, but much under threat owing to human interaction.

== Geography ==
Shaglyteniz lies in the southern part of the Ishim Plain, southwest of the Russian border. It is one of the main lakes of the region. It is an endorheic lake located at the bottom of a depression. Lakes Kalibek and Kishi-Karoy lie to the east, and Zhamantuz to the west, but Shaglyteniz is the only lake in the area where the water is relatively fresh.

The lake is surrounded by a strip of marshes and ponds. The Shagalaly river flows into the lake from the south. In years where the river and other small streams feed the lake with abundant melted snow, the surface of Shaglyteniz may expand to 380 square kilometers (150 sq mi).

== Flora and fauna ==
There are large sections of reeds, bulrushes and sedges growing on the lakeshore. The red-breasted goose, as well as species of ducks, waders and gulls, may be found at the lake. The main fish species in Shaglyteniz is crucian carp.

== See also ==
- List of lakes of Kazakhstan
