= Air Kokshetau =

Kazakh airline

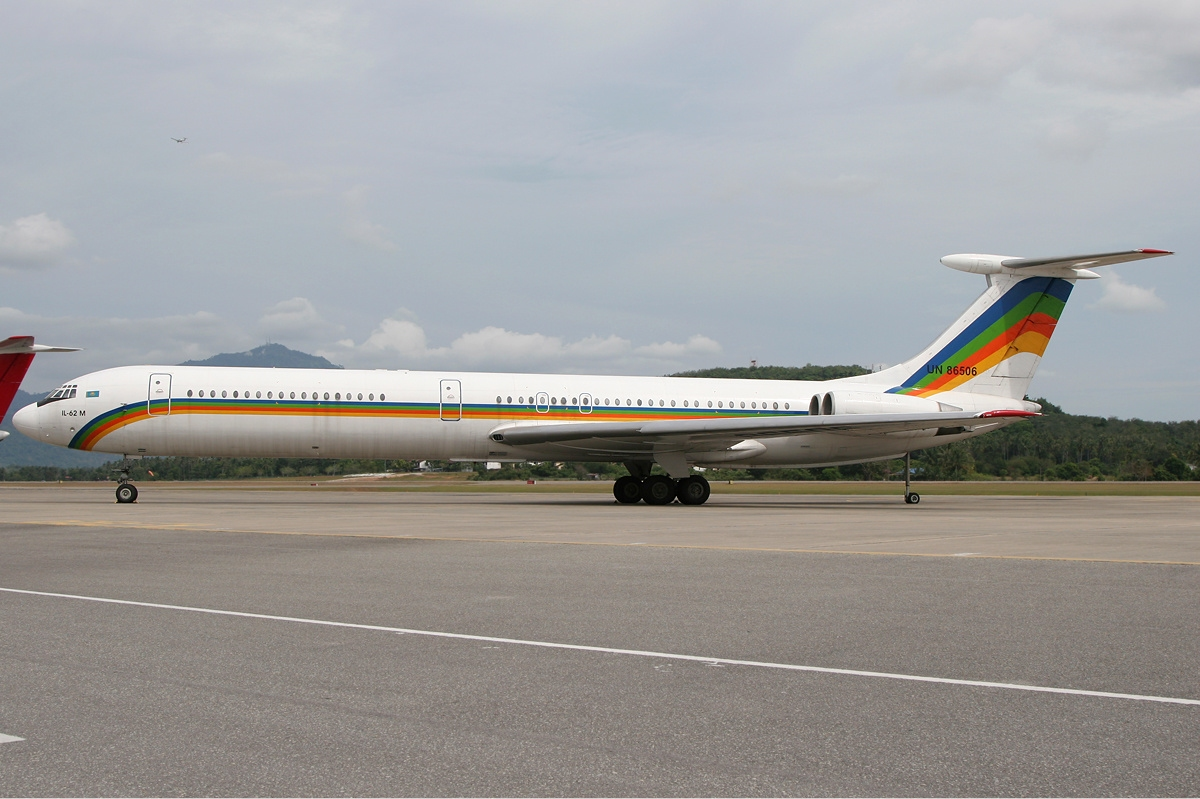
IATA	ICAO	Call sign
0K	KRT	KOKTA
- Founded: 1968; 58 years ago (as Kokchetavsky Squadron)
- Commenced operations: 2002; 24 years ago (as Air Kokshetau)
- Ceased operations: 2010
- Hubs: Kokshetau Airport
- Fleet size: 8
- Destinations: 4
- Headquarters: Kokshetau Airport, Akmola Region, Kazakhstan
- Key people: Yuriy Gryaznov (president); Erlan Turusbekov
- Employees: 238 (April 2007)

Air Kokshetau, also legally known as JSC Aircompany Kokshetau (Kazakh: АҚ «Көкшетау Әуекомпаниясы» / AQ «Kökşetau Äuekompaniasy»; Russian: АО «Авиакомпания Кокшетау"»), was an airline based in Kokshetau, Akmola Region, Kazakhstan, based at Kokshetau International Airport. It operated a fleet of eight aircraft.

It started operations in 2002, it offered flights to both domestic and international destinations and had 238 employees (at March 2007). In 2010, the airline was shut down.

== History ==
Founded in 1968 as Kokchetavsky Squadron. In 2002 they offered flights to both domestic and international destinations. In March 2007 the airline had 238 employees. In 2010 the airline was shut down.

== Destinations ==
Air Kokshetau operated scheduled flights from Kokshetau to Almaty, Astana, Petropavl and from Astana to Oral using Yakovlev Yak-40 aircraft.

^{[Base]}	Base
^{[Terminated]}	Terminated destination

Country	City	Province/Region	IATA	ICAO	Airport	Notes	Refs
Kazakhstan
Kazakhstan	Almaty	Almaty	ALA	UAAA	Almaty International Airport		
Kazakhstan	Kokshetau	Akmola Region	KOV	UACK	Kokshetau Airport ^{[Base]}	Base	
Kazakhstan	Astana	Astana	TSE	UACC	Astana International Airport		
Kazakhstan	Oral	West Kazakhstan	URA	UARR	Oral Ak Zhol Airport		
Kazakhstan	Petropavl	North Kazakhstan	PKK	UACP	Petropavl Airport		

== Fleet ==
At closure, the Air Kokshetau fleet included the following aircraft:

Air Kokshetau fleet
Aircraft	In service	Orders	Passengers	Notes
Ilyushin Il-62M	2	—	186	
Yakovlev Yak-40D	3	—	40	
Air Kokshetau Cargo fleet
Yakovlev Yak-40K	3	—	Cargo	
Total	8	—		

=== Former fleet ===
In October 2004 the airline acquired ownership of an Airbus A310-300 formerly operated by Air Kazakhstan.

Air Kokshetau former aircraft
Aircraft	Total	Introduced	Retired
Antonov An-2P	1	1997	2010

== See also ==
- Transport in Kazakhstan
- List of airports in Kazakhstan
- List of companies of Kazakhstan
- Economy of Kazakhstan
