= Taiynsha =

Taiynşa Тайынша
- City
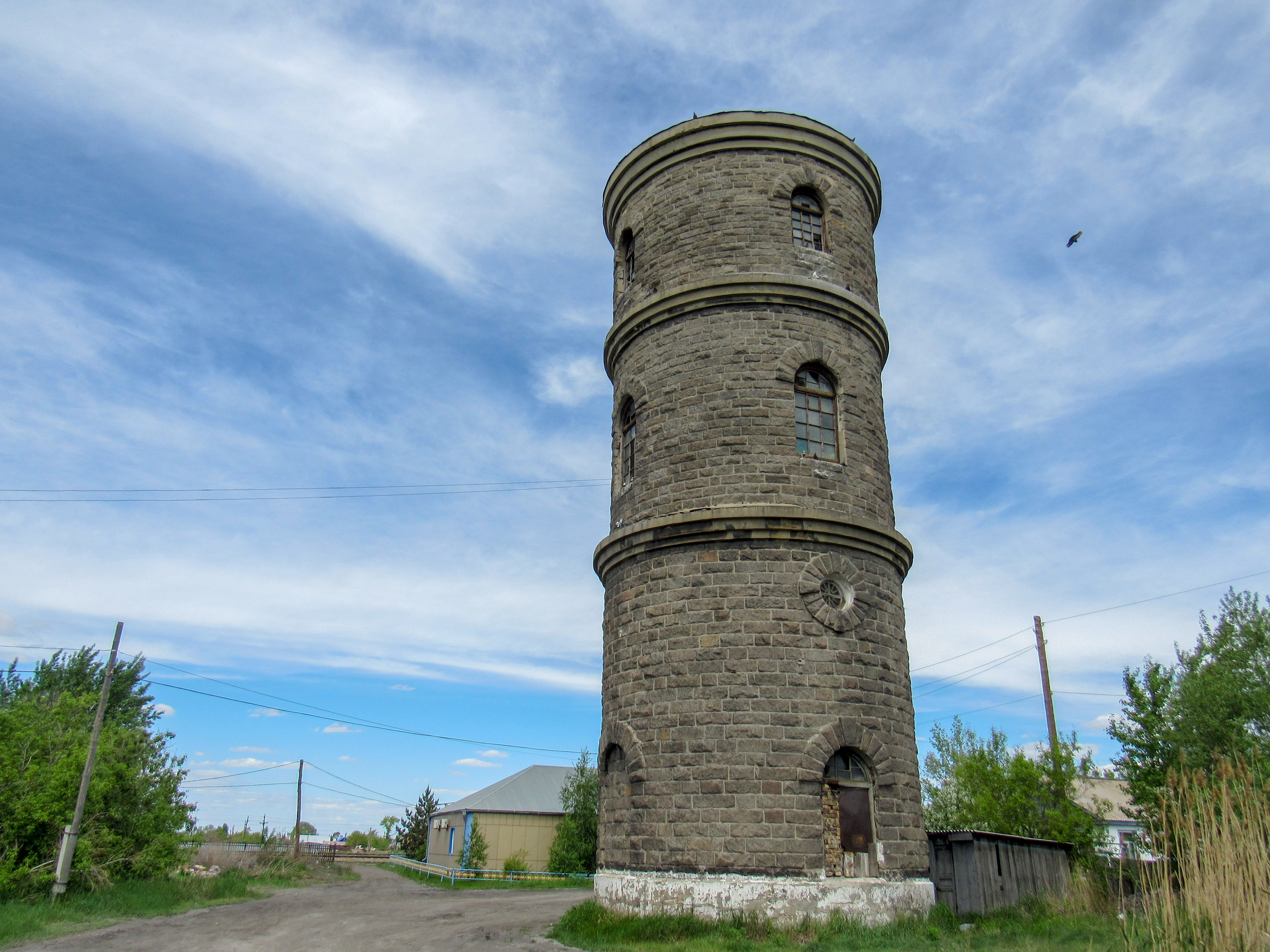
- A water tower that was built in the 1920s

- Location in Kazakhstan
- Coordinates: 53°50′52″N 69°45′50″E
- Country: Kazakhstan
- Region: North Kazakhstan Region
- District: Taiynşa District
- Rural District: Taiynşa Rural District

Population (2019)
  - Total: 11,422
- Time zone: UTC+6 (East Kazakhstan Time)
- Post code: 151000, 151001

Taiynşa (Kazakh: Тайынша, Taiynşa), known as Krasnoarmeysk between 1962 and 1997, is a city and the administrative center of Taiynşa District in North Kazakhstan Region of Kazakhstan (KATO code - 596020100). Population: 12,418 (2009 census results); 13,233 (1999 census results).

== Geography ==
Taiynşa town lies 12 kilometers (7.5 mi) to the south of lake Shaglyteniz and 45 kilometers (28 mi) to the west of lake Kalibek.

=== Climate ===
Climate data for Taiynsha (1991–2020)
Month	Jan	Feb	Mar	Apr	May	Jun	Jul	Aug	Sep	Oct	Nov	Dec	Year
Mean daily maximum °C (°F)	−11.7 (10.9)	−9.8 (14.4)	−1.9 (28.6)	11.2 (52.2)	20.5 (68.9)	25.0 (77.0)	25.6 (78.1)	24.0 (75.2)	17.6 (63.7)	9.4 (48.9)	−2.4 (27.7)	−8.9 (16.0)	8.2 (46.8)
Daily mean °C (°F)	−15.6 (3.9)	−14.1 (6.6)	−6.4 (20.5)	5.4 (41.7)	13.6 (56.5)	18.7 (65.7)	19.8 (67.6)	17.8 (64.0)	11.5 (52.7)	4.4 (39.9)	−6.1 (21.0)	−12.7 (9.1)	3.0 (37.4)
Mean daily minimum °C (°F)	−19.7 (−3.5)	−18.5 (−1.3)	−10.7 (12.7)	0.1 (32.2)	6.7 (44.1)	12.2 (54.0)	14.0 (57.2)	12.0 (53.6)	6.0 (42.8)	0.0 (32.0)	−9.7 (14.5)	−16.7 (1.9)	−2.0 (28.4)
Average precipitation mm (inches)	13.9 (0.55)	10.6 (0.42)	14.6 (0.57)	23.4 (0.92)	27.2 (1.07)	46.5 (1.83)	64.6 (2.54)	50.6 (1.99)	26.7 (1.05)	26.7 (1.05)	21.9 (0.86)	17.7 (0.70)	344.4 (13.56)
Average precipitation days (≥ 1.0 mm)	5.0	3.5	3.9	5.1	6.1	7.3	8.9	7.7	5.5	6.6	6.3	5.2	71.1
Source: NOAA
