= Bukpa Hill =

Hill located in northern Kazakhstan

Bukpa Buqpa
- Location within Kazakhstan

Highest point
- Elevation: 363 m (1,191 ft)
- Coordinates: 53°16′19″N 69°19′50″E

Naming
- Native name: Buqpa (Kazakh)
- English translation: "To Hide"

Geography
- Location: Kokshetau, Akmola Region, Kazakhstan
- Parent range: Kokshetau Hills, Kazakh Uplands (Saryarka)

Geology
- Mountain type: Hill

Climbing
- Easiest route: Easy hillwalking on well-defined paths from Abai Street or Auelbekov Street
- Access: Kokshetau

Bukpa (Kazakh: Buqpa; [bʊqpɑ]) is a hill that rises in the north-western area of Kokshetau, the capital of Akmola Region in the northern part of Kazakhstan. It is open to the public and provides excellent panoramic views of the city and beyond, including Mount Kokshe, is relatively easy to climb, and is popular for hillwalking. Bukpa is one of the main landmarks in the city, and have attracted visitors and tourists for many years. The Kokshetau Sign is located on its northeastern slope. The name “Bukpa” literally means "to hide" in the Kazakh language. Bukpa Hill was the location of the St George's Church (1847–75).

== Geography ==
The hill, 1,191 feet (363 m) at an elevation of above sea level and located at 53°16′19″N 69°19′50″E and forms part of the group of hills in Kokshetau. Kokshetau is traditionally thought of as being a hilly city, because of the number of hills in or close to the city centre. The Kokshetau Hills are part of the Kazakh Uplands located in the northern Kazakhstan. The Lake Kopa lies to the south of the Bukpa Hill. The hill is a prominent feature of Kokshetau’s skyline. It is surrounded by residential suburbs. In winter, Bukpa often has a covering of snow.

== History ==
In the summer of 1827, the construction of the Kokshetau settlement began at the foot of Bukpa Hill.

In 1847, the construction of the St George's Church was completed on the north-eastern slope of the hill. However, in 1875 the church was dismantled and moved to the city centre of Kokshetau.

== Gallery ==
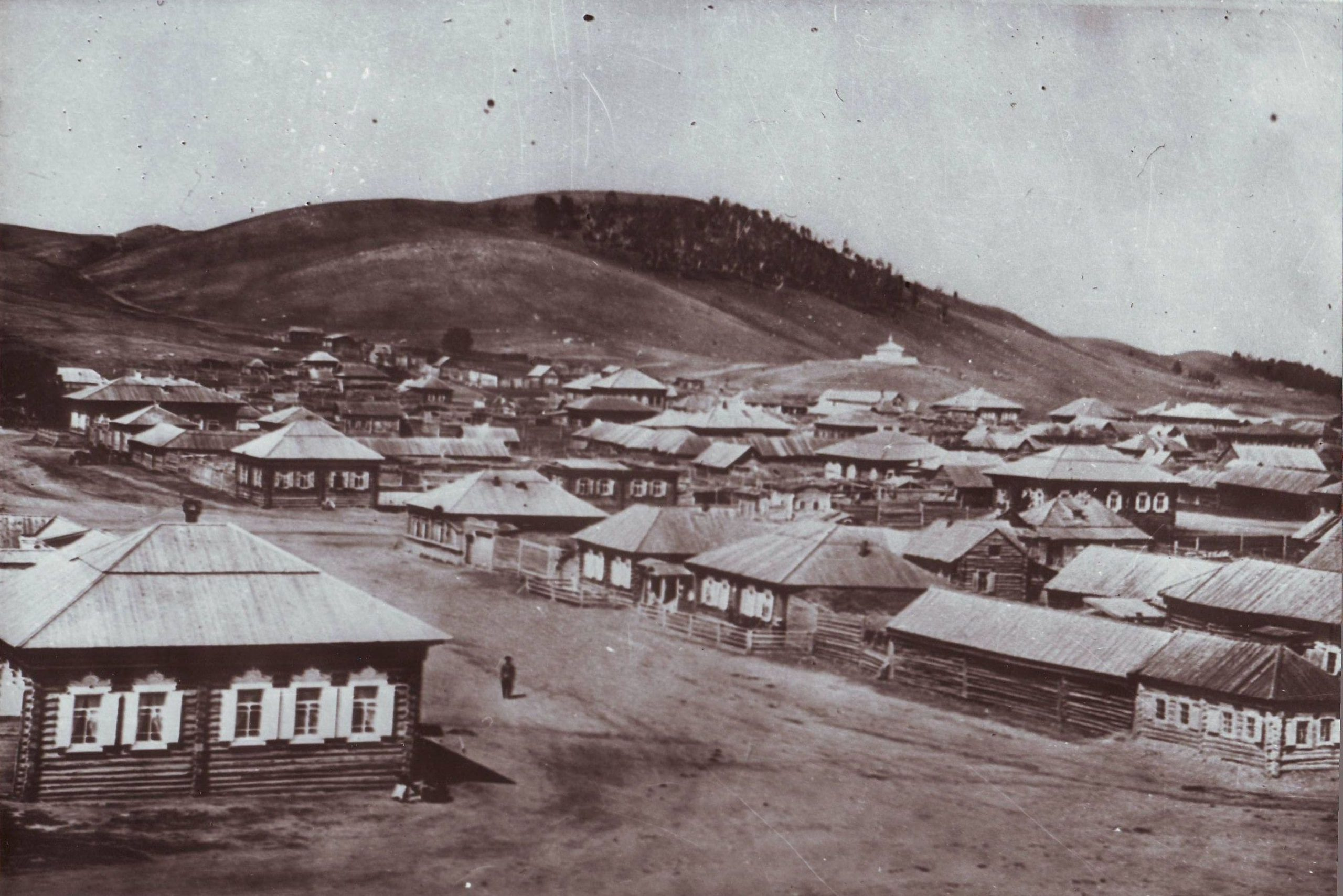
Bukpa Hill, perhaps Kokshetau's best known hill, c. 1880.

== In literature ==
Kokshetau hills are mentioned in lines of the book of Anastasia Tsvetayeva's Starost i molodost (Old Age and Youth, 1988):

"…Did someone write about the fact that the close mountains interfere, and the distant ones (the nearby hills) help to live? The hills have embraced Kokchetav in a semicircle, they console it: we are here, we are around, we protect it from the cold, emptiness and infinity ... "

== See also ==
- Kokshetau
