= Kyzyltan, Akmola Region =

Qyzyltañ Қызылтаң (Kazakh) Кызылтан (Russian)
- Village
- Location in Kazakhstan
- Coordinates: 53°22′32″N 69°41′45″E
- Country: Kazakhstan
- Region: Aqmola Region

Population (2009)
  - Total: 394
- Time zone: UTC+6 (ALMT)
- Area code: 7172
- Vehicle registration: C, O, W and 03 (region)

Qyzyltañ (Kazakh: Қызылтаң, Qyzyltañ) is a village (selo) in Zerendi District, Aqmola Region, in northern part of Kazakhstan. The KATO code is 115652400.

== Demographics ==
=== Population ===
Population: 508 (1999 census results). (255 males and 253 females). As of 2009, the population of Qyzyltañ was 394 inhabitants (193 males and 201 females).
