= St George's Church, Kokshetau =

St. George's Church
- Äulie Georgi Jeñıstıñ Şırkeuı (Kazakh); Гео́ргиевская це́рковь (Russian)
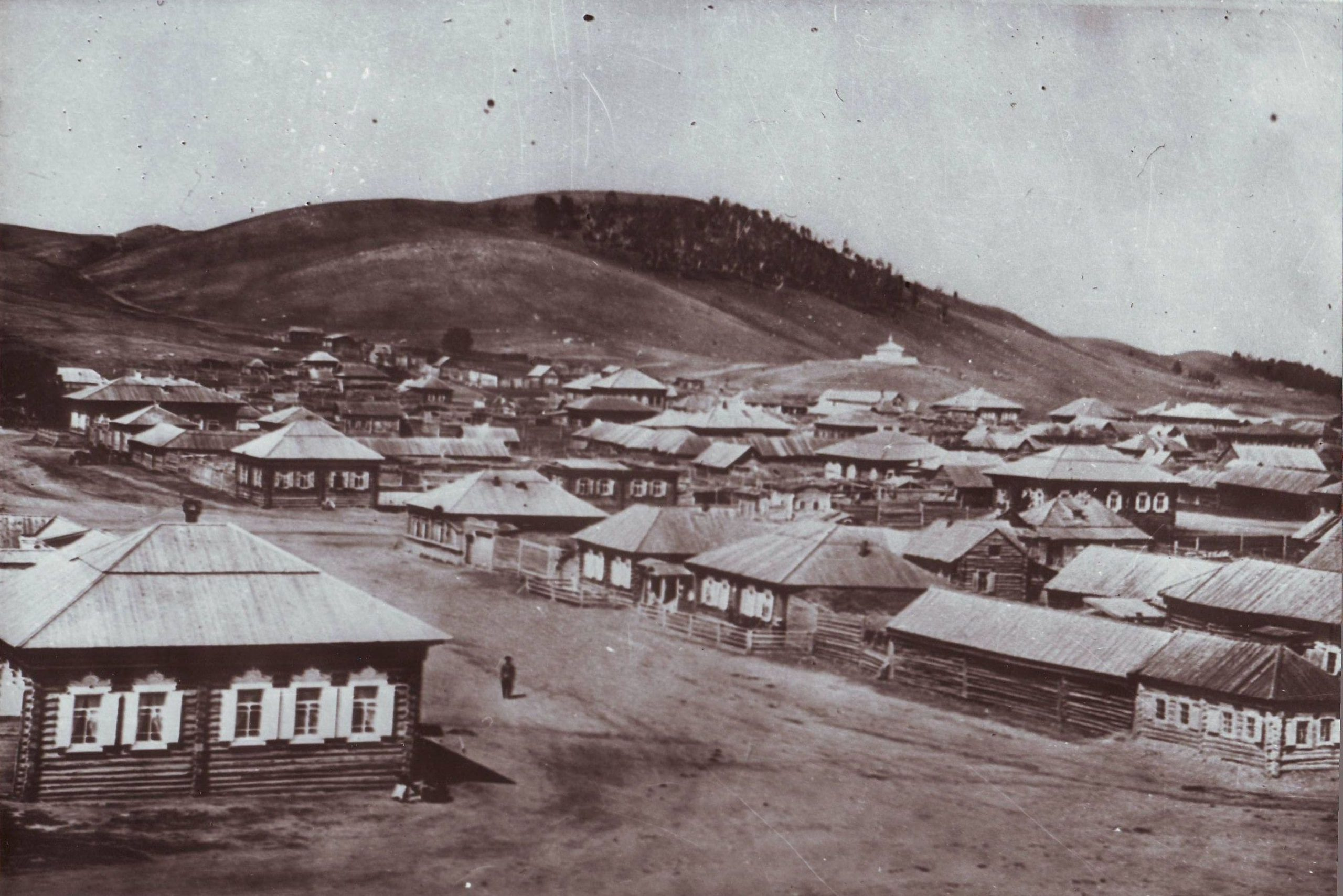
- View of the chapel and Bukpa Hill, 1880
- St. George's Church
- 53°16′55.7″N 69°21′52.4″E
- Location: Kokshetau, Akmola Region
- Country: Kazakhstan
- Denomination: Russian Orthodox

History
- Status: Parish church
- Founded: 1846 First church 1875 (moved church)
- Dedication: Saint George
- Consecrated: 26 November 1851

Architecture
- Functional status: Destroyed
- Architectural type: Classicism
- Style: Russian
- Completed: Between 1846 and 1847
- Demolished: 1940; 86 years ago

Specifications
- Materials: Wood

The St. George's Church Kokshetau (Kazakh: Әулие Георгий Жеңістің Шіркеуі, romanized: Mäsıhtıñ qaita tırılu şırkeuı; Russian: Гео́ргиевская це́рковь, or Georgyevskaya tserkov) was a Russian Orthodox church dedicated to the Saint George. It was located on the north-eastern slope of Bukpa Hill in Kokshetau, the capital of Akmola Region in the northern part of Kazakhstan.

The church was constructed between 1846 and 1847, consecrated in 1851, and then in 1875, the church was dismantled and moved to the public square in Kokshetau and consecrated again on January 11, 1876. It was destroyed in 1940; 86 years ago.

It was the first church built in Kokshetau.

== History ==
The St. George's Church in Kokshetau was founded in 1846. It was the first largest building in city. On November 26, 1851, the church was consecrated. Initially, the church was built on the north-eastern slope of the Bukpa Hill. In 1875, the church was moved to the center of the city 53°16′55″N 69°21′52″E and was re-consecrated on January 11, 1876.

After the relocation of the church to the new place in Kokshetau, the chapel was built on the site of the moved church. As part of the program of state atheism, the church was confiscated from the community as part of the Soviet Union's antireligious campaigns and has operated as a warehouse in the 1930s, like many religious buildings at that time.

On January 17, 1940, it was turned into a museum and was then demolished.

== See also ==
- USSR anti-religious campaign (1921–1928)
- Persecution of Christians in the Soviet Union
