= Shagalaly =

River in Kazakhstan

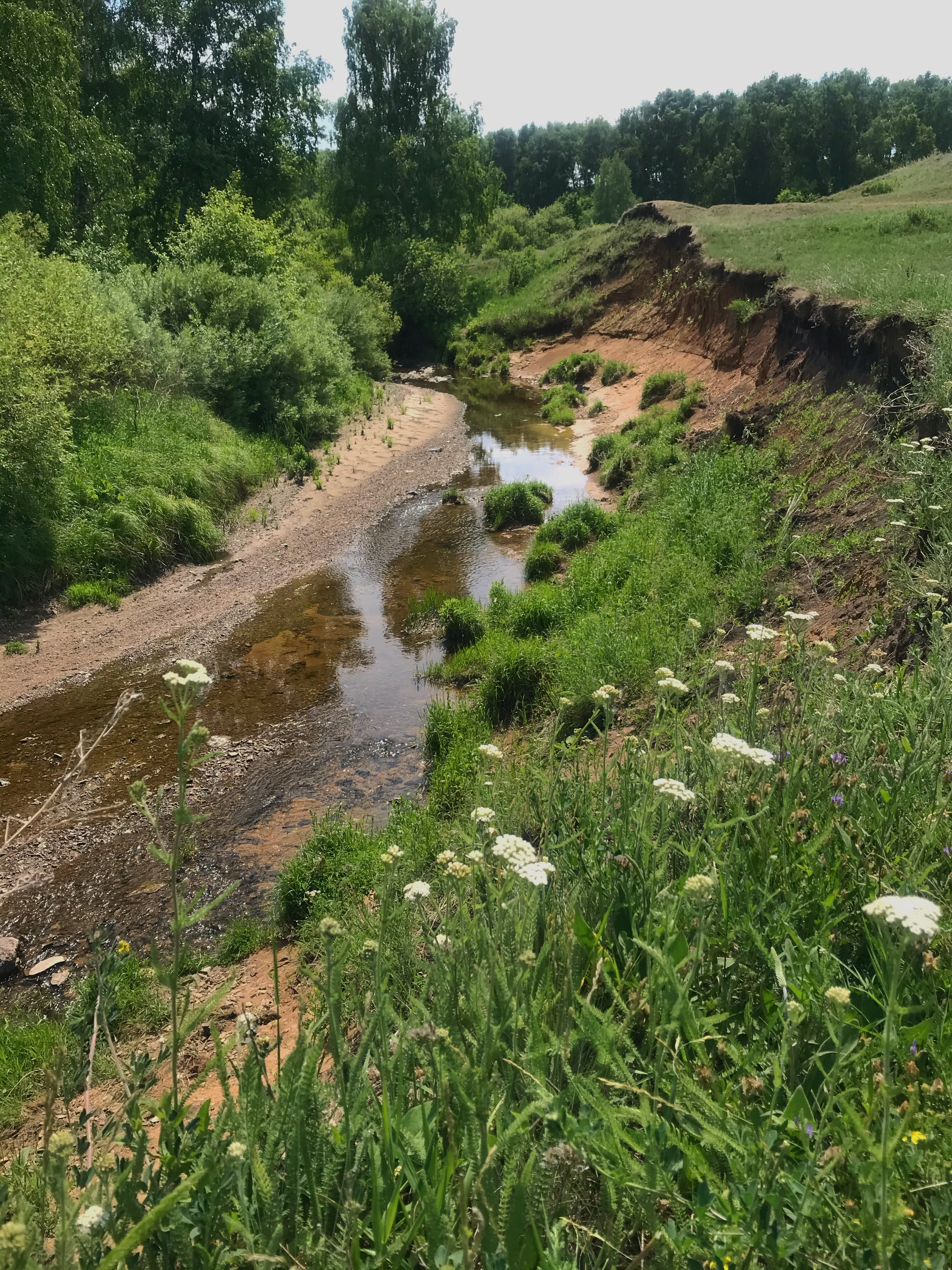
- Shagalaly river
- Native name: Шағалалы (Kazakh)

Location
- Country: Kazakhstan

Physical characteristics
- Source
  - location: Mount Ak-Cheku
  - coordinates: 52°48′43.9″N 68°33′20.9″E
- Mouth: Shaglyteniz
  - coordinates: 53.145°N 68.995°E
  - elevation: 134 m (440 ft)
- Length: 234 km (145 mi)
- Basin size: 9,220 km^{2} (3,560 sq mi)

The Shagalaly (Kazakh: Шағалалы, Şağalaly), formerly known as Chaglinka, is a river of northern Kazakhstan. It is 234 kilometres (145 mi) long, and has a drainage basin of 9,220 square kilometres (3,560 sq mi). The river flows through the territory of Akmola and North Kazakhstan regions. The Kazakh word "Shagalaly" means an "area where there are many seagulls"

== Course ==
The river originates from the Mount Ak-Cheku between knolls in Dzhilandy and Zerenda mountains. It flows northward along a wide valley. Close to Lake Kopa, it bends eastward and flows into the western lakeshore, near the city of Kokshetau. Then it flows out of the northern end of the lake heading roughly northwards. It has its mouth at the southern end of the lake Shaglyteniz.

=== Main tributaries ===
The largest tributaries of the Shagalaly are, from source to mouth:

- Bala-Kylchakty (right)
- Tosyn (left)
- Kendzheboy (left)
