= Odesskoye =

Rural locality in Omsk Oblast, Russia

Coordinates: 54°12′40″N 72°57′50″E

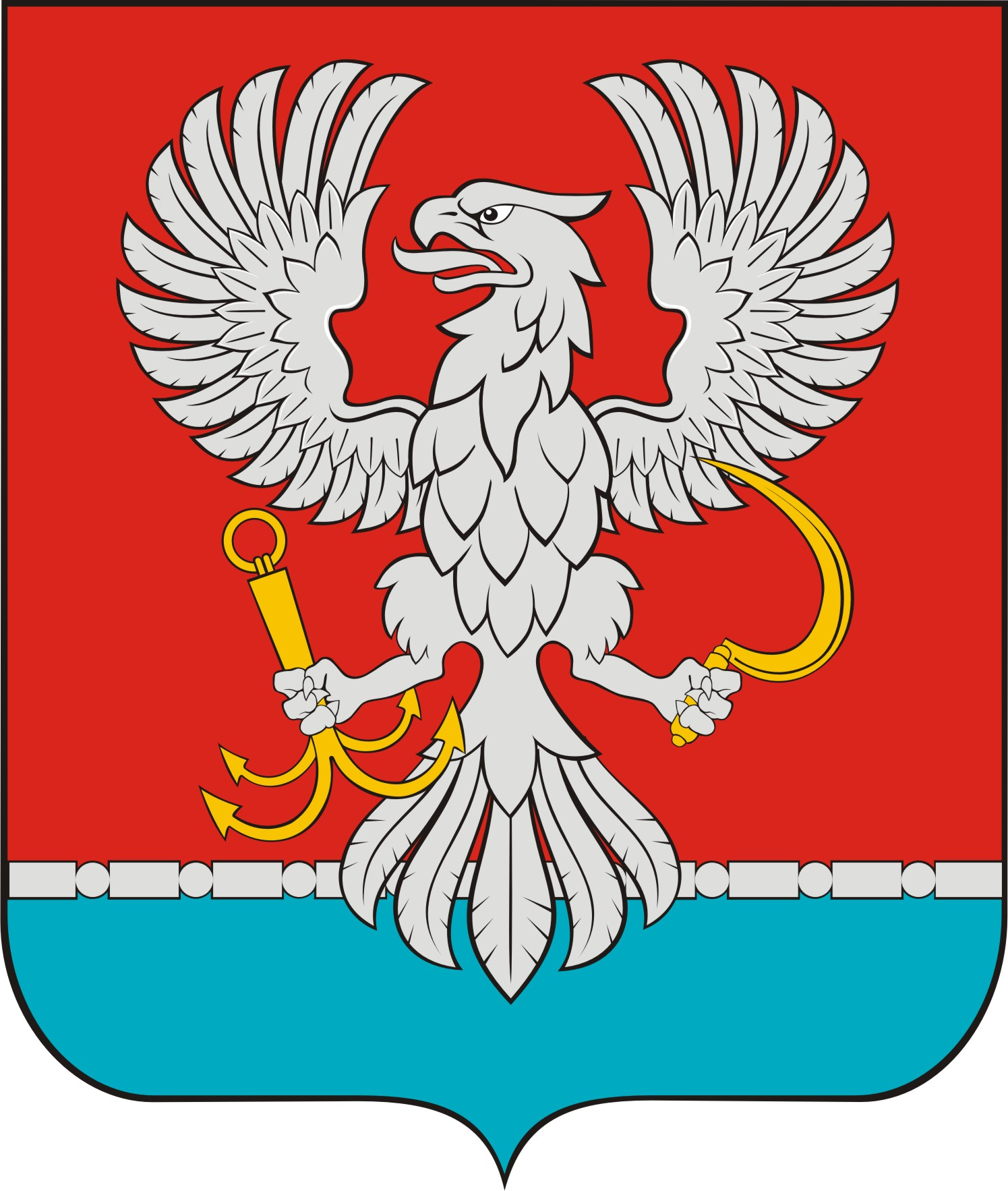
Coat of arms of Odesskoye

Odesskoye (Russian: Одесское) is a rural locality (a selo) and the administrative center of Odessky District, Omsk Oblast, Russia. Population: 6,148 (2010 census); 6,098 (2002 census); 6,000 (1989 Soviet census).

== Climate ==
Climate data for Odesskoye (extremes 1938-present)
Month	Jan	Feb	Mar	Apr	May	Jun	Jul	Aug	Sep	Oct	Nov	Dec	Year
Record high °C (°F)	2.8 (37.0)	4.1 (39.4)	13.4 (56.1)	30.2 (86.4)	37.8 (100.0)	40.0 (104.0)	40.0 (104.0)	37.8 (100.0)	34.3 (93.7)	27.1 (80.8)	13.3 (55.9)	9.0 (48.2)	40.0 (104.0)
Mean daily maximum °C (°F)	−13.4 (7.9)	−11.3 (11.7)	−3.4 (25.9)	10.3 (50.5)	20.2 (68.4)	24.8 (76.6)	25.7 (78.3)	23.8 (74.8)	17.3 (63.1)	9.0 (48.2)	−3.3 (26.1)	−10.2 (13.6)	7.5 (45.4)
Daily mean °C (°F)	−17.4 (0.7)	−15.6 (3.9)	−7.9 (17.8)	4.7 (40.5)	13.4 (56.1)	18.5 (65.3)	19.7 (67.5)	17.5 (63.5)	11.1 (52.0)	3.8 (38.8)	−6.9 (19.6)	−14.2 (6.4)	2.2 (36.0)
Mean daily minimum °C (°F)	−21.4 (−6.5)	−19.8 (−3.6)	−12.4 (9.7)	−0.4 (31.3)	6.4 (43.5)	12.0 (53.6)	13.9 (57.0)	11.6 (52.9)	5.6 (42.1)	−0.5 (31.1)	−10.4 (13.3)	−18.1 (−0.6)	−2.8 (27.0)
Record low °C (°F)	−43.9 (−47.0)	−42.8 (−45.0)	−38.9 (−38.0)	−26.1 (−15.0)	−8.9 (16.0)	−2.2 (28.0)	2.2 (36.0)	−1.0 (30.2)	−8.0 (17.6)	−21.0 (−5.8)	−39.0 (−38.2)	−47.2 (−53.0)	−47.2 (−53.0)
Average precipitation mm (inches)	15.0 (0.59)	14.3 (0.56)	17.4 (0.69)	22.3 (0.88)	26.4 (1.04)	45.5 (1.79)	61.0 (2.40)	49.3 (1.94)	22.0 (0.87)	24.4 (0.96)	26.6 (1.05)	18.9 (0.74)	343.1 (13.51)
Source: pogoda.ru.net
