= Odessky District =

Odessky District Одесский район (Russian)
- District
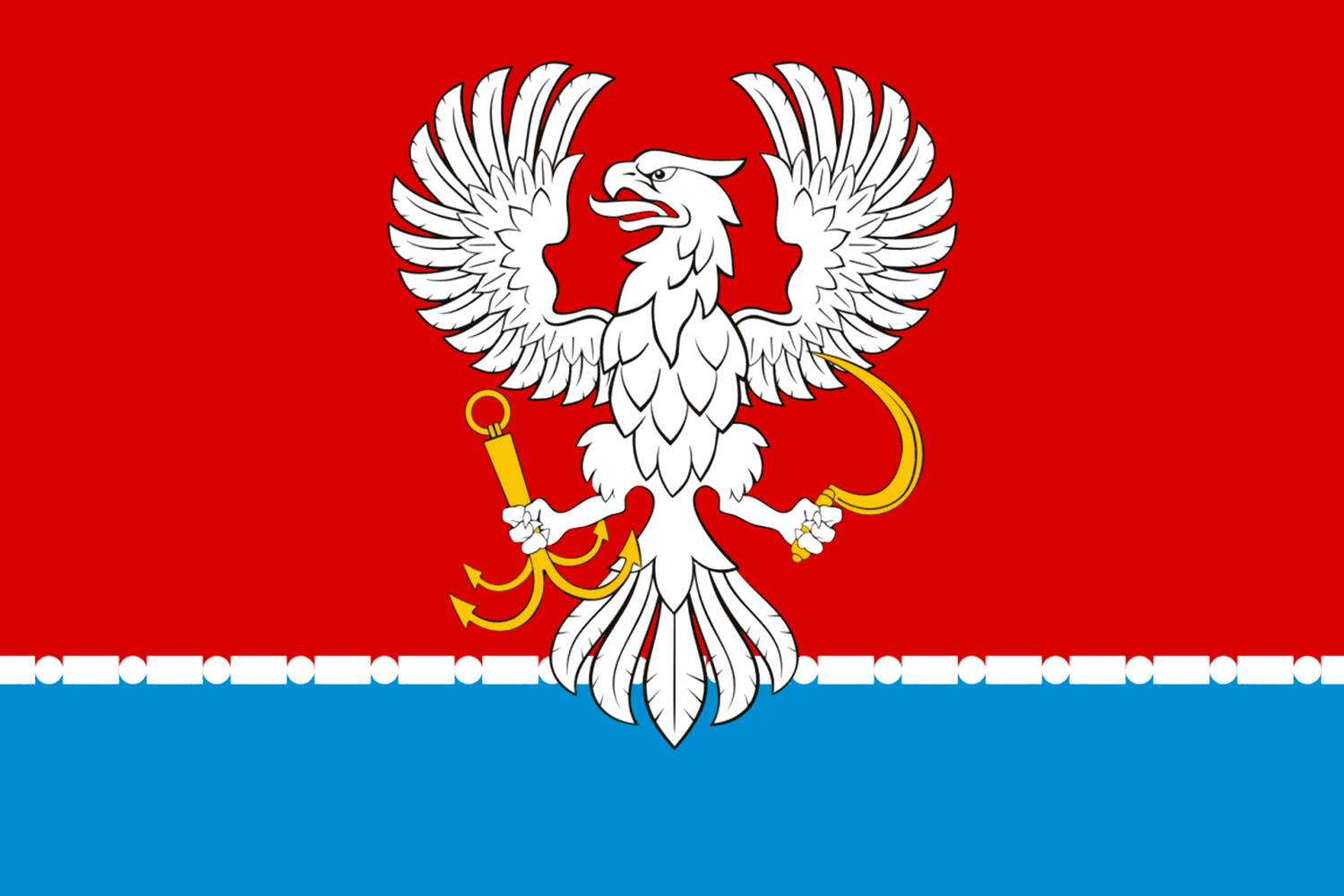
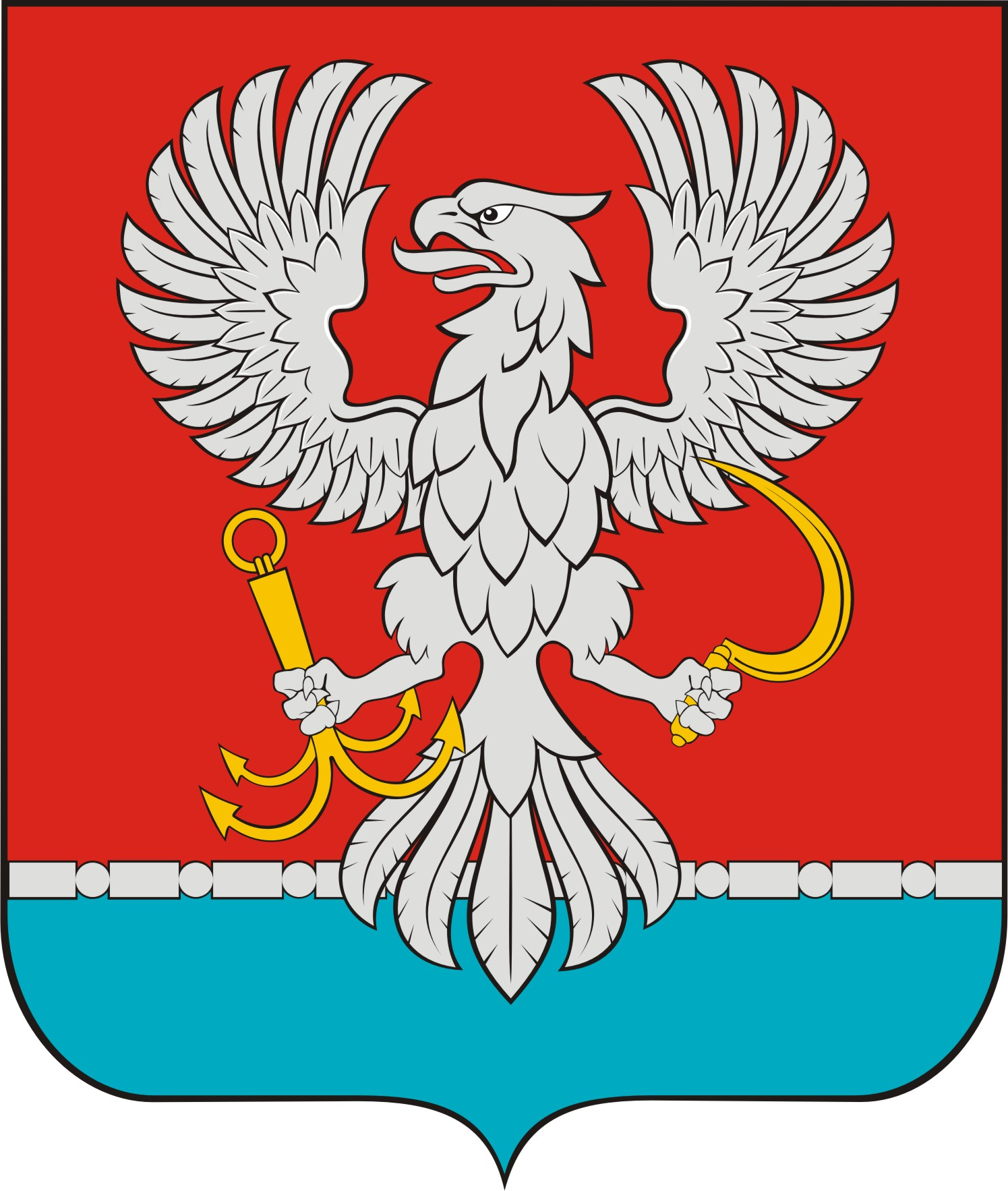
- Flag Coat of arms
- Location of Odessky District in Omsk Oblast
- Coordinates: 54°11′10″N 73°03′00″E
- Country: Russia
- Federal subject: Omsk Oblast
- Established: 1925
- Administrative center: Odesskoye

Area
  - Total: 1,800 km^{2} (690 sq mi)

Population (2010 Census)
  - Total: 17,422
  - Density: 9.7/km^{2} (25/sq mi)
  - Urban: 0%
  - Rural: 100%

Administrative structure
  - Administrative divisions: 9 rural okrug
  - Inhabited localities: 20 rural localities

Municipal structure
  - Municipally incorporated as: Odessky Municipal District
  - Municipal divisions: 0 urban settlements, 9 rural settlements
- Time zone: UTC+6 (MSK+3)
- OKTMO ID: 52642000
- Website: http://odes.omskportal.ru/

Odessky District (Russian: Оде́сский райо́н) is an administrative and municipal district (raion), one of the thirty-two in Omsk Oblast, Russia. It is located in the south of the oblast. The area of the district is 1,800 square kilometers (690 sq mi). Its administrative center is the rural locality (a selo) of Odesskoye. Population: 17,422 (2010 Census); 18,652 (2002 census); 22,584 (1989 Soviet census). The population of Odesskoye accounts for 35.3% of the district's total population.

== Notable residents ==
- Gennady Komnatov (1949–1979), Soviet Olympic cyclist, born in Zhelannoye
