= Lake Kopa =

Lake in the country of Kazakhstan

Lake Kopa Қопа көлі
- Қопа көлі (Kazakh)
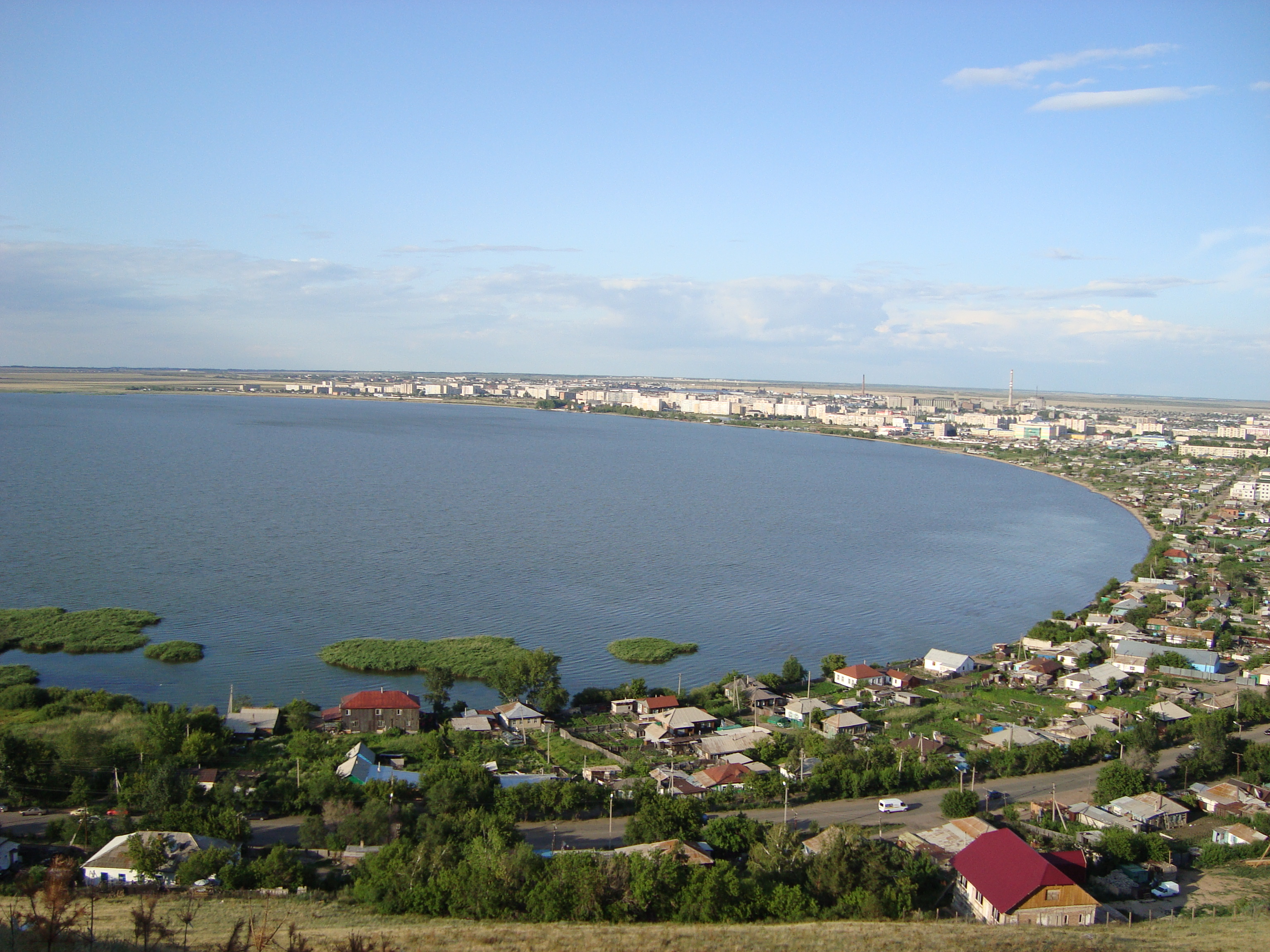
- Spring view of Lake Kopa from Bukpa Hill

- Location within Kazakhstan
- Location: Kokshetau, Akmola Region, Kazakhstan
- Coordinates: 53°18′34″N 69°20′36″E
- Type: lake
- Primary inflows: 2 rivers (Shagalaly, Kylshakty)
- Primary outflows: Shagalaly
- Catchment area: 3,860 square kilometres (1,490 sq mi)
- Basin countries: Kazakhstan
- Max. length: 5.6 kilometres (3.5 mi)
- Max. width: 12 kilometres (7.5 mi)
- Surface area: 14 square kilometres (5.4 sq mi)
- Average depth: 2–3 metres (6.6–9.8 ft)
- Max. depth: 3.1 metres (10 ft)
- Shore length^{1}: 15.2 kilometres (9.4 mi)
- Surface elevation: 223.8 metres (734 ft)
- Frozen: November to April
- Settlements: Kokshetau (city)
- ^{1} Shore length is not a well-defined measure.

Lake Kopa (Kazakh: Қопа, Qopa; [qopɑ]) is a lake in the city of Kokshetau, located in Akmola Region close to the foot of Kokshetau Elevation in northern Kazakhstan. Its elevation is 223.8 m (734 ft) above sea level and has a maximum depth of about 6 m. It is 5.6 km long and 12 km wide. The total surface area of the lake is about 14 km^{2} (5.4 sq mi) depending on water level. It is fed by two rivers and is drained by the Shagalaly. The area of Lake Kopa fluctuates year to year, but in recent years the size of the lake has been decreasing overall. Kopa is used for fishery.

== Location and description ==
Lake Kopa is located in the north of Kazakhstan. Lake Kopa is 5.6 kilometres (3.5 mi) long, up to 12 kilometres (7.5 mi) wide and its area is 14 square kilometres (5.4 sq mi). The lake lies near the foot of the Kokshetau Massif, and near the north-western part of the city of Kokshetau. Lake Zholdybay lies about 20 kilometers (12 mi) to the WNW.

Lake Kopa has an area of 14 square kilometres (5.4 sq mi) and an average depth of 2.0–3.0 metres (6 ft 7 in – 9 ft 10 in). Most of the total catchment area of 3,860 square kilometres (1,490 sq mi), is accounted for by the tributaries of the lake: the Shagalaly river to the southwest, and the Kylshakty river to southeast. Only a very small part, 80 square kilometres (31 sq mi), comes from the lake itself.

The south and west sides of the lake are separated from the adjacent beaches by depressed areas, and along the southern and eastern coasts are sand and pebble beaches. The northern and eastern shores of the lake are low, flat, and overgrown with vegetation, meaning that the water surface of the lake is basically open only along the western and northern stretches. The lake bottom is viscous, smooth, and covered with a layer of silt clay, loam, and sand, it averages 2 metres (6 ft 7 in), but can reach a depth of as much as 6 metres (20 ft) in the northern part.

50–70 m-high hills (Bukpa Hill) come close to the lake from south-west. In 1955, the volume of water in the lake was 39,200,000 cubic metres (1.38×10^{9} cu ft), with a surface area of 13.6 square kilometres (5.3 sq mi). From 1955 to 1990 the volume of the lake has decreased by 13,000,000 cubic metres (460,000,000 cu ft) and now stands at only 26,000,000 cubic metres (920,000,000 cu ft). The lake sees amplitude fluctuations of between 0.5 and 1.5 metres (1 ft 8 in and 4 ft 11 in).

Shagalaly flows into the lake from south-west and flows out from the north part, therefore, Lake Kopa regulates flow of Shagalaly river in its lower stream. Administratively, the lake and the adjacent land are within Akmola Region of Kazakhstan.

== See also ==
- Kokshetau – the city at Lake Kopa
