= Kyzyltu, Kazakhstan =

Kyzyltu
- Village
- Location in Kazakhstan
- Coordinates: 43°25′0″N 77°4′25″E
- Country: Kazakhstan
- Region: Almaty Region

Population
  - Total: 1,220
- Time zone: UTC+6 (East Kazakhstan Time)

Kyzyltu, sometimes spelled Qyzyltu (Kazakh: Қызылту, Qyzyltu) is a village in Almaty Region of south-eastern Kazakhstan. In 2013, SCAT Flight 700 crashed while approaching Almaty International Airport.
