= Taiynsha District =

Coordinates: 53°52′48″N 69°43′48″E

Taiynşa Тайынша
- District
- Тайынша ауданы
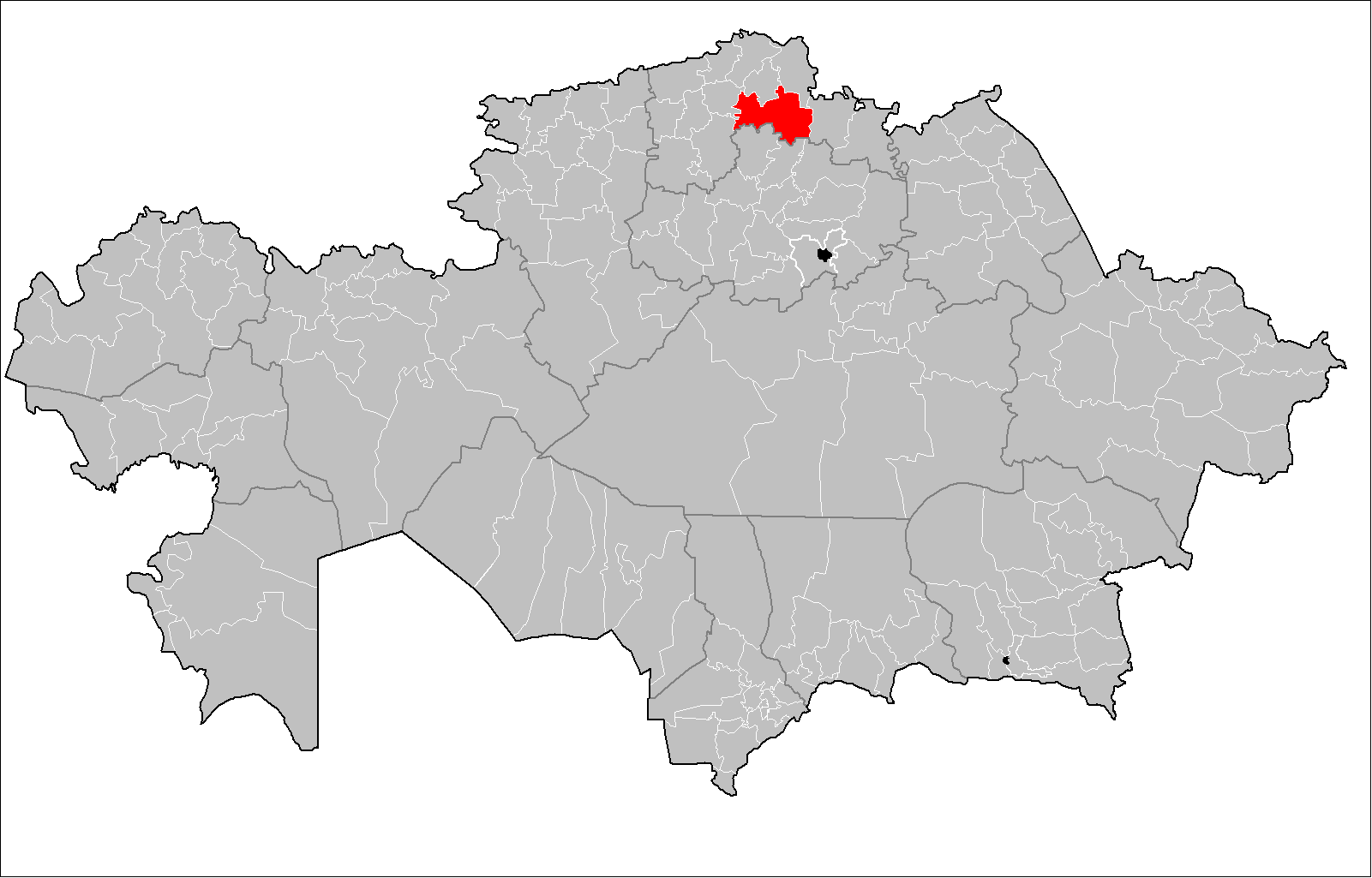
- Country: Kazakhstan
- Region: North Kazakhstan Region
- Administrative center: Taiynşa

Government
  - Akim: Berik Alzhanov

Population (2013)
  - Total: 47,965
- Time zone: UTC+6 (East)

Taiynşa (Kazakh: Тайынша ауданы, Taiynşa audany) is a district of North Kazakhstan Region in northern Kazakhstan. The administrative center of the district is the town of Taiynşa. Population: 47,965 (2013 estimate); 50,757 (2009 census results); 67,001 (1999 census results).

== Demography ==
Kazakh 26.8% (15.7k)

Polish 22.4% (13.2k)

Russian 21.7% (12.7k)

Ukrainian 12.7% (7.4k)

German 9.9% (5.8k)

Belarusian 3.2% (1.9k)

== Geography ==
Lake Zhamantuz, as well as part of Shaglyteniz lake, are located in the district.
