= Mount Kokshe =

Highest mountain of Akmola Region in Kazakhstan

- Kokshetau / Kokshe-Tau / Gora Sinyukha
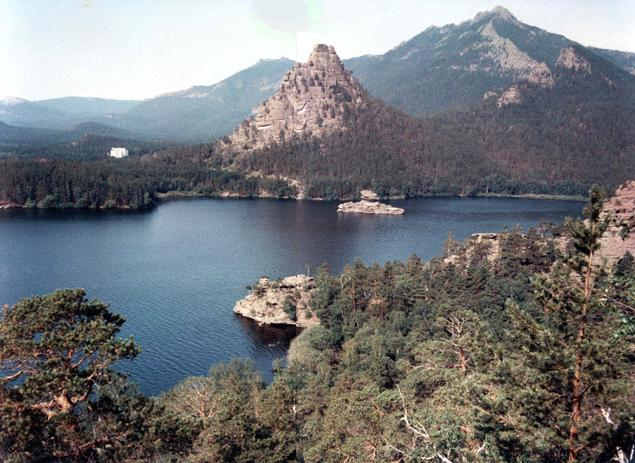
- Mount Kokshe as viewed from Bolektau

Highest point
- Elevation: 947 m (3,107 ft)
- Prominence: 592 m (1,942 ft)
- Coordinates: 53°04′48″N 70°11′18″E

Naming
- Native name: Көкше-тау (Kazakh); Kökşe-tau (Kazakh); Кокше-тау (Russian); Kokshe-tau (Russian); Гора Синюха (Russian); Gora Sinyukha (Russian)
- English translation: "Blueish mountain"
- Pronunciation: Kazakh [køkɕetɑw]

Geography
- Location within Kazakhstan
- Country: Kazakhstan
- Region: Akmola
- District: Burabay
- Parent range: Kokshetau Mountains; Kokshetau Hills; Kazakh Uplands

Mount Kokshe, also known as Kokshetau or Kokshe-Tau (Kazakh: Көкше-тау; pronounced [køkɕetɑw], Russian: Кокше-тау, гора́ Синю́ха, Gora Sinyukha, lit. 'blueish mountain') is a mountain in the Kokshetau Massif, Akmola Region, northern Kazakhstan. It is the highest mountain in Akmola Region and the second highest mountain in the northern part of Kazakhstan.

The mountain is part of the Burabay National Park and is a popular destination, attracting tourists and climbers. It has several walking and scrambling routes leading to its summit and, as such, many walking guides recommend it to the occasional walker wishing to climb a mountain. The nearest city is Shchuchinsk, 25 km (16 mi) away.

== Names and etymology ==
The mountain's official name in Kazakh is Kokshetau or Kokshe-Tau, Kokshe is derived from the common Kazakh word for "blueish", tau, meaning "mountain", thus kokshe + tau meaning "Blueish mountain"; its Russian name is Gora Sinyukha meaning the same. Both names hint at the bluish tint of the mountains when viewed from a distance.

== Geography ==
With an elevation of 947 metres (3,107 ft) above sea level and a prominence of 592 m (1,942 ft), the peak is the highest point of the Kokshetau Massif, as well as the highest peak of the Kokshetau Hills. It is located near lake Kishi Shabakty, west of Lake Burabay, dominating the skyline of the lake area.

Mount Kokshe has an absolute elevation of 947 m. It is situated in the Kazakh Uplands and is the second-highest mountain in the northern part of Kazakhstan, after Mount Akbet (at 1,022 metres (3,353 ft)) which is located in the Bayanaul Range, Pavlodar Region. The relief of the mountain area is spurry-ridgy with narrow rocky watersheds. The mountain slopes are covered with pine and pine-birch forests.

== See also ==
- Kokshetau

== Image gallery ==
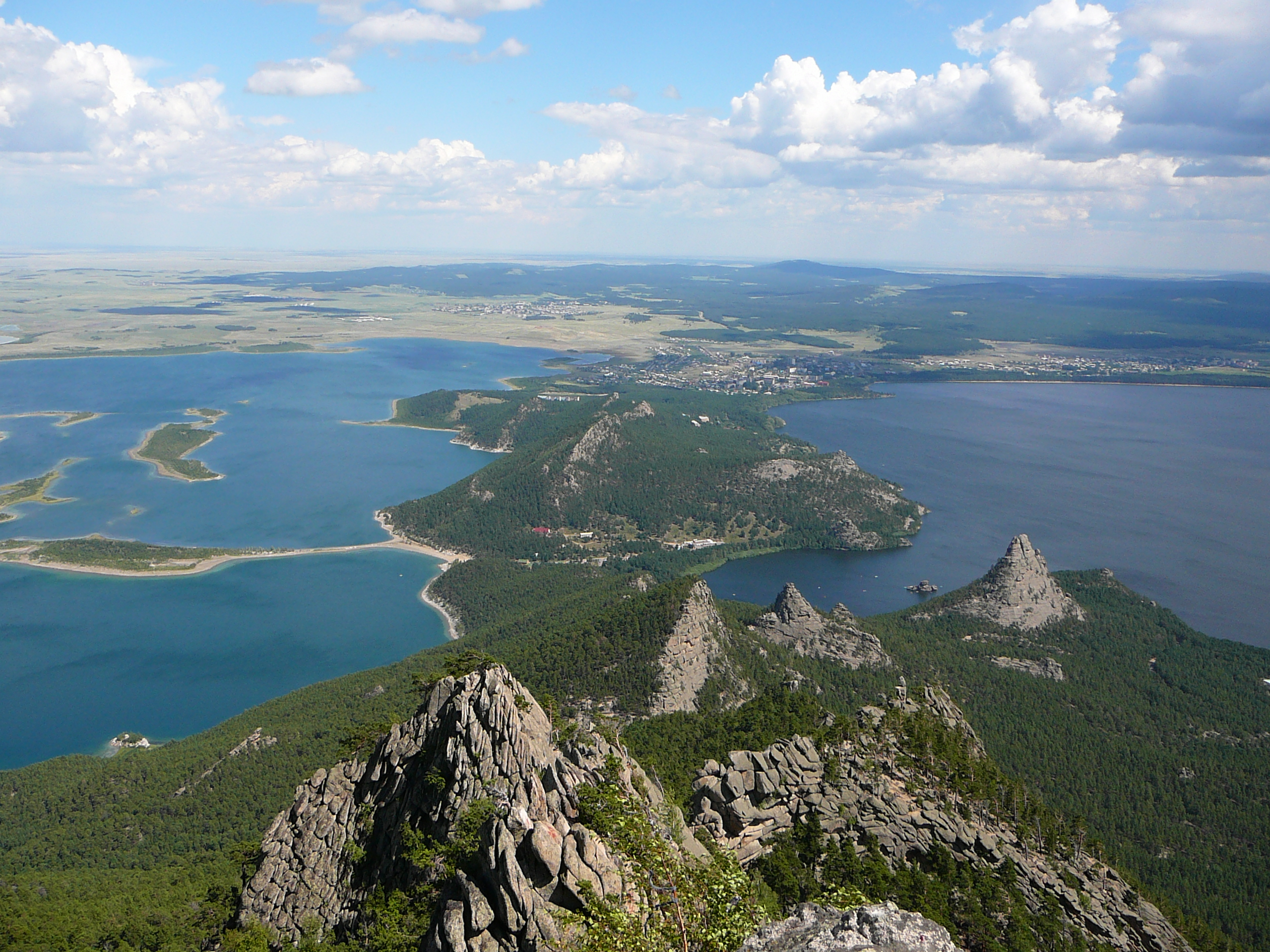
View of Lake Ulken Shabakty and Lake Burabay from Sinyukha

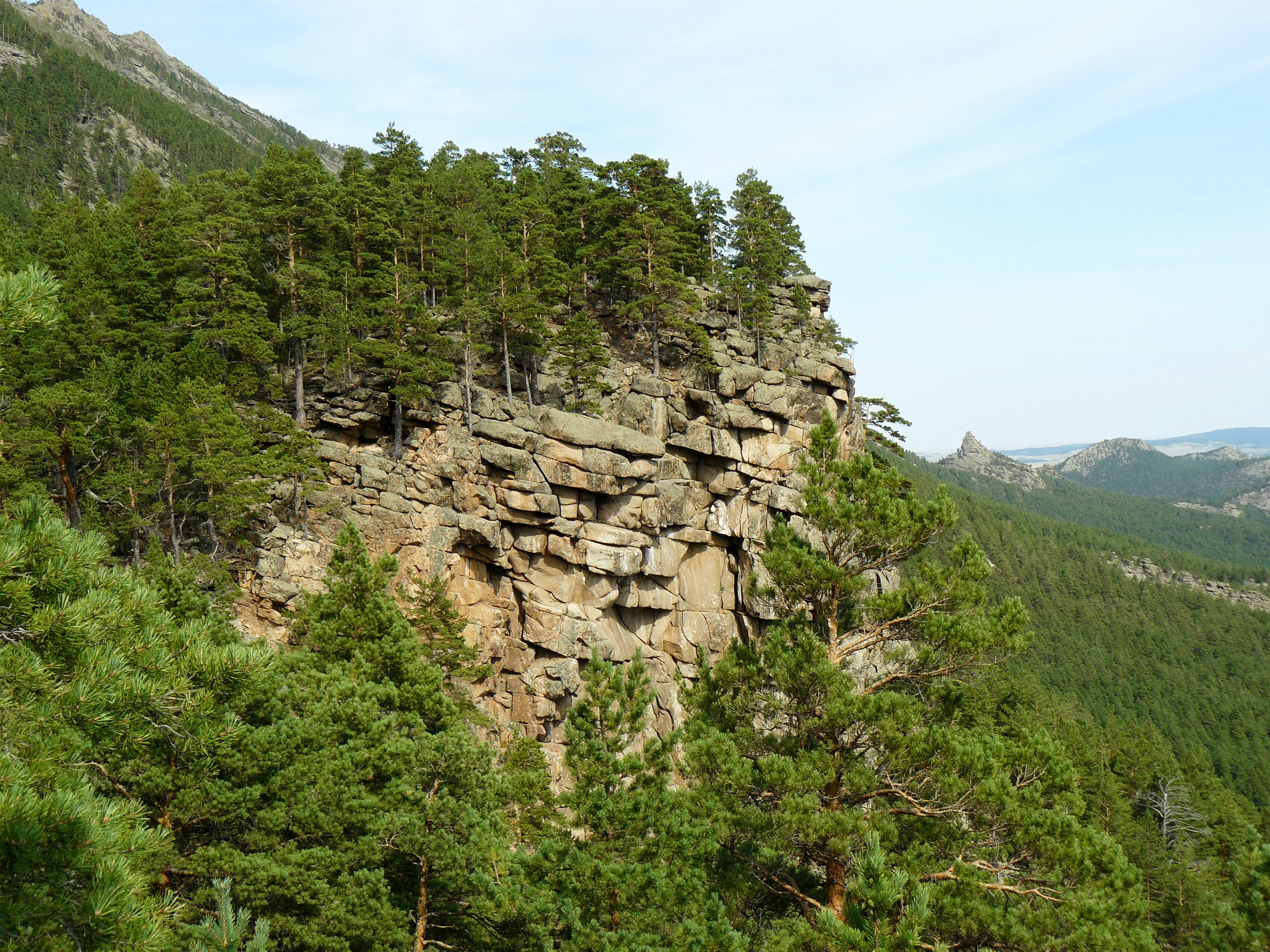
Mount Kokshe (Gora Sinyukha) in August, 2019

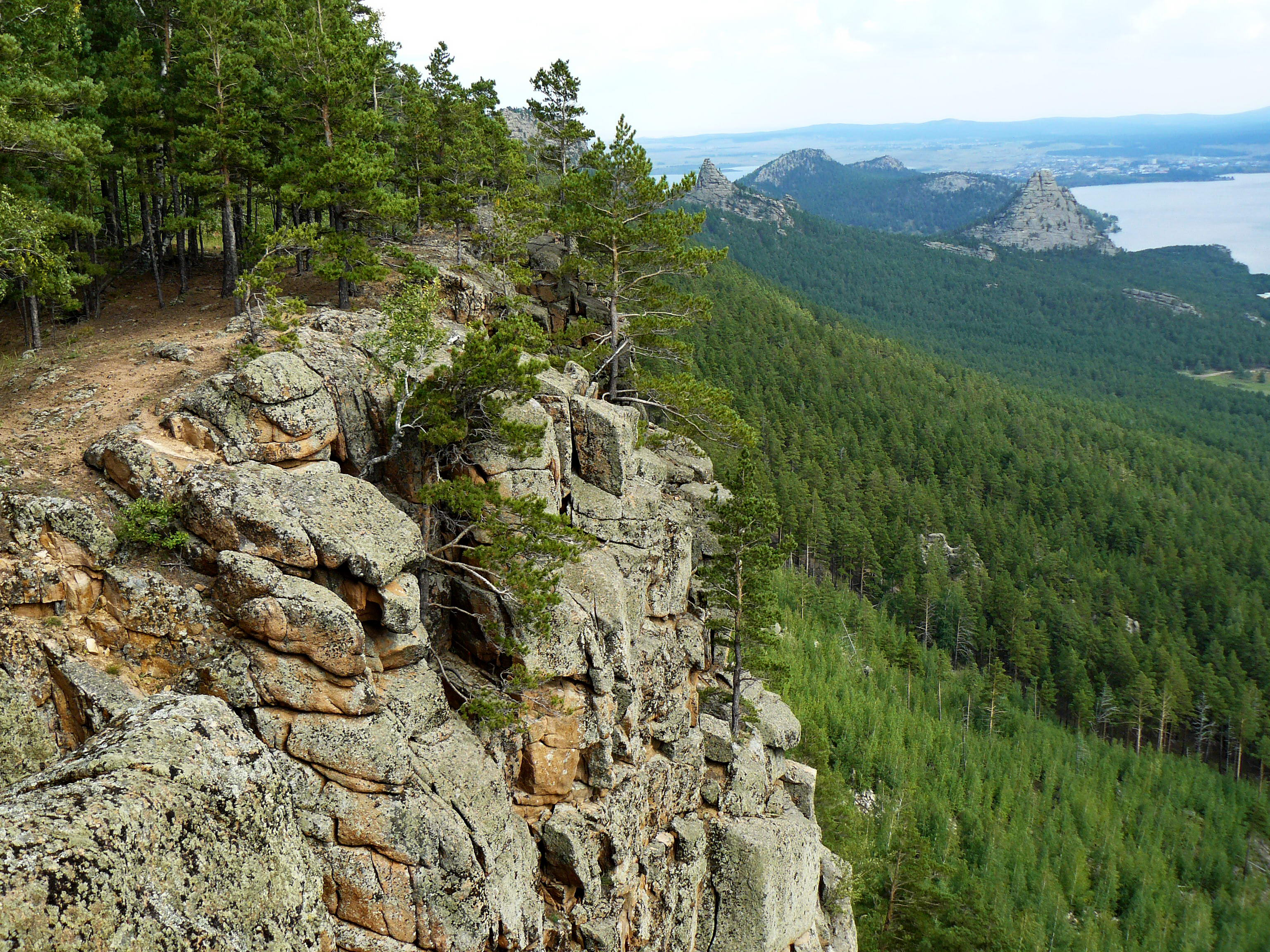
Mount Kokshe (Gora Sinyukha) in August, 2019

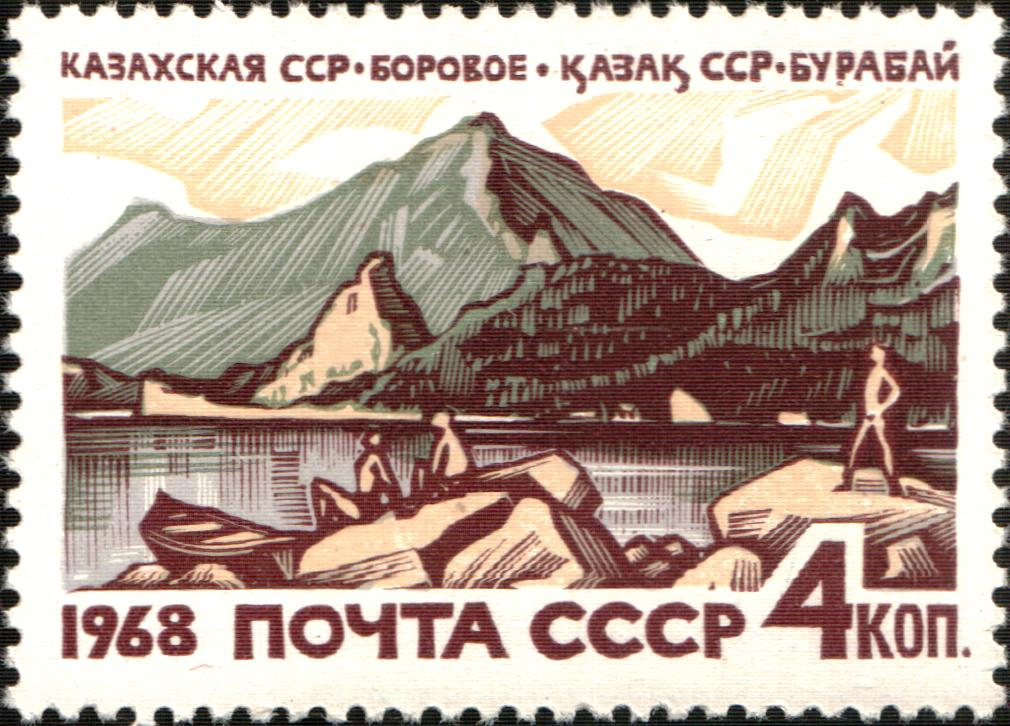
USSR stamp: Borovoe, Kazakhstan. Series: Soviet Resort Towns
