= Burabay (disambiguation) =

Burabay can refer to:

- Burabay, Burabay District, Kazakhstan
- Burabay District, a district in Akmola Region, Kazakhstan
- Lake Burabay, a lake of the Kokshetau Lakes
- Burabay National Park, a protected area in the Kokshetau Mountains, Kazakh Uplands
- Burabay Ski Jumps, a ski jumping complex in Shchuchinsk, Kazakhstan
