= Kokshetau Mountains =

Range of mountains in Kazakhstan

- Көкшетау тауы
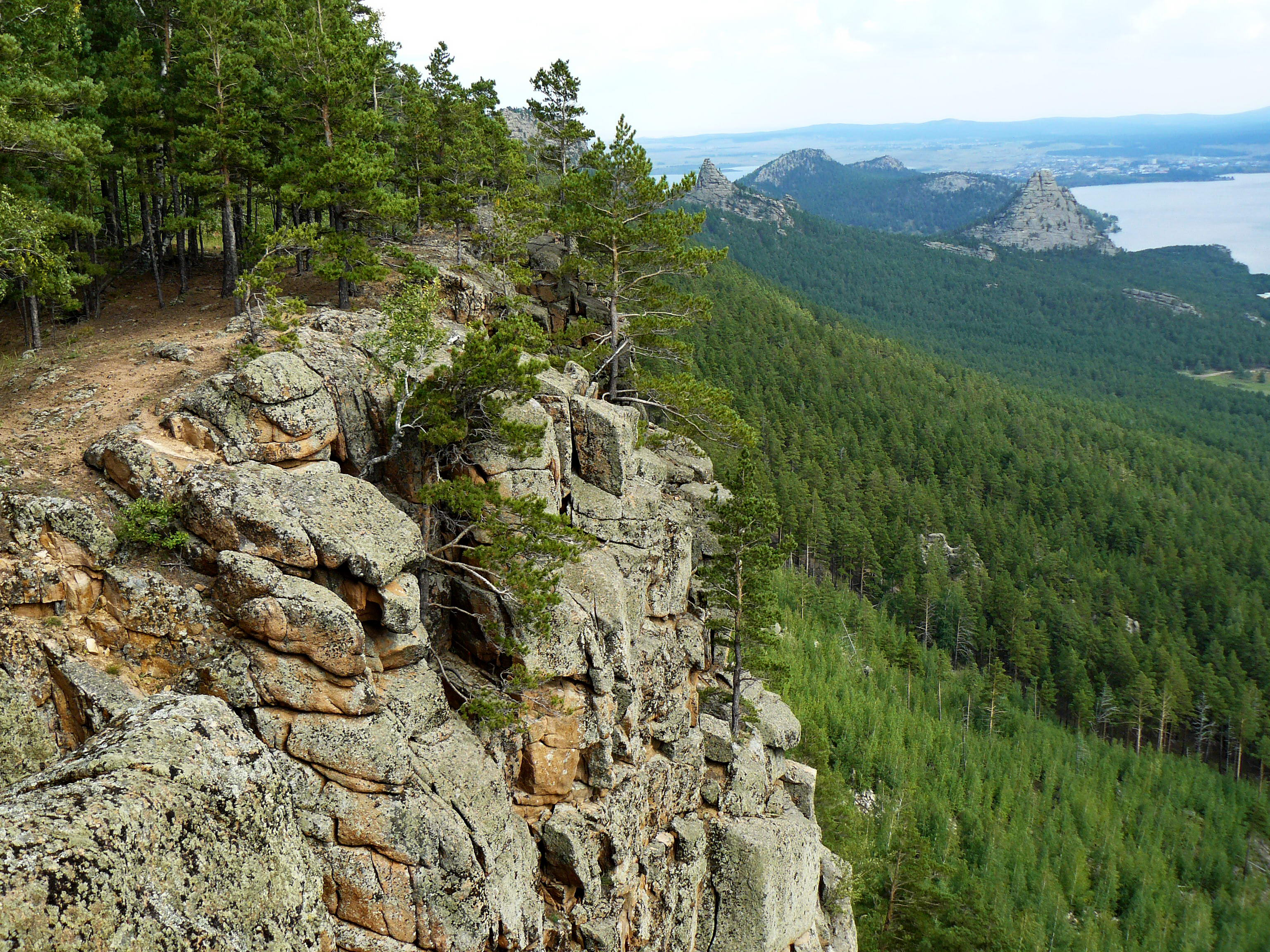
- Landscape of the massif

Highest point
- Peak: Mount Kokshe
- Elevation: 970 m (3,180 ft)
- Coordinates: 53°04′48″N 70°11′18″E

Dimensions
- Length: 20 km (12 mi) N / S
- Width: 5 km (3.1 mi) E / W

Geography
- Location within Kazakhstan
- Location: Kazakhstan
- Range coordinates: 53°00′N 70°21′E
- Parent range: Kazakh Uplands

Geology
- Orogeny: Alpine orogeny
- Rock age(s): Devonian and Silurian
- Rock type: Granite

Kokshetau Mountains (Kazakh: Көкшетау тауы) or Kokshetau Massif is a mountain massif in the Akmola Region, Kazakhstan.

Shchuchinsk city and Burabay spa town are located in the massif. The mountains are part of the Burabay National Park, a protected area.

== Geography ==
The Kokshetau Mountains are part of the Kokshetau Hills, a subsystem of the Kazakh Uplands (Saryarka). It is a small, compact mountainous cluster of moderate altitude located in the northern sector of the highlands. Small lakes lie in the central, western and northwestern area of the range, including Burabay, Shchuchye, Ulken Shabakty and Kishi Shabakty.

The highest point of the massif is Mount Kokshe, towering at 947 meters (3,107 ft) and located in the northern part near Kishi Shabakty Lake. River Kylshakty has its sources in the Kokshetau Massif. The slopes are often cut by deep ravines. Owing to denudation and weathering of the mountains there are bizarre-shaped rocky outcrops. Some of these rock formations display horizontal layers of eroded granite stone and look like ruined towers.

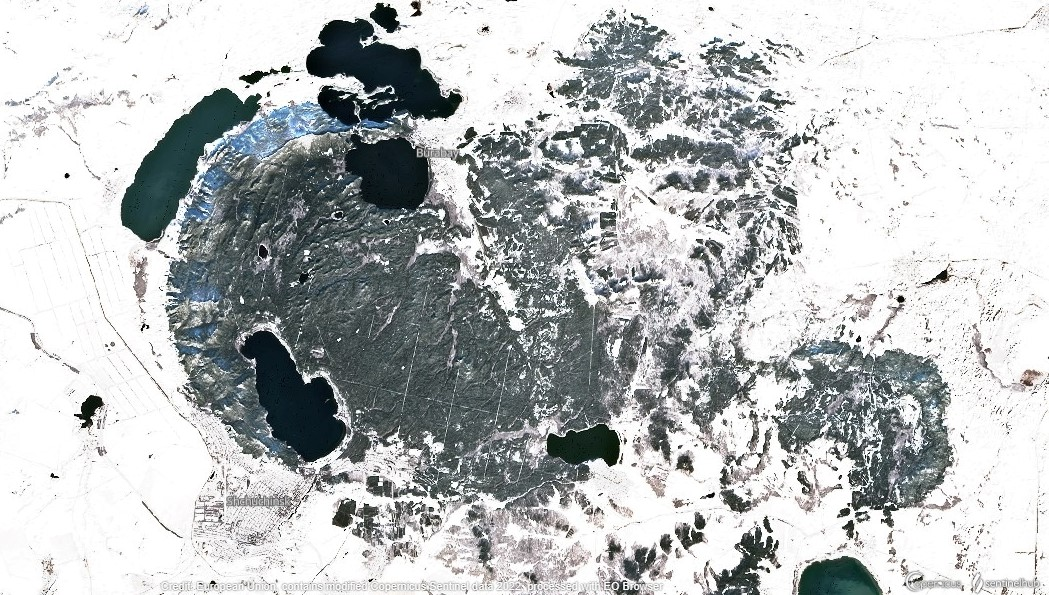
Kokshetau Massif in the winter. Sentinel-2 image

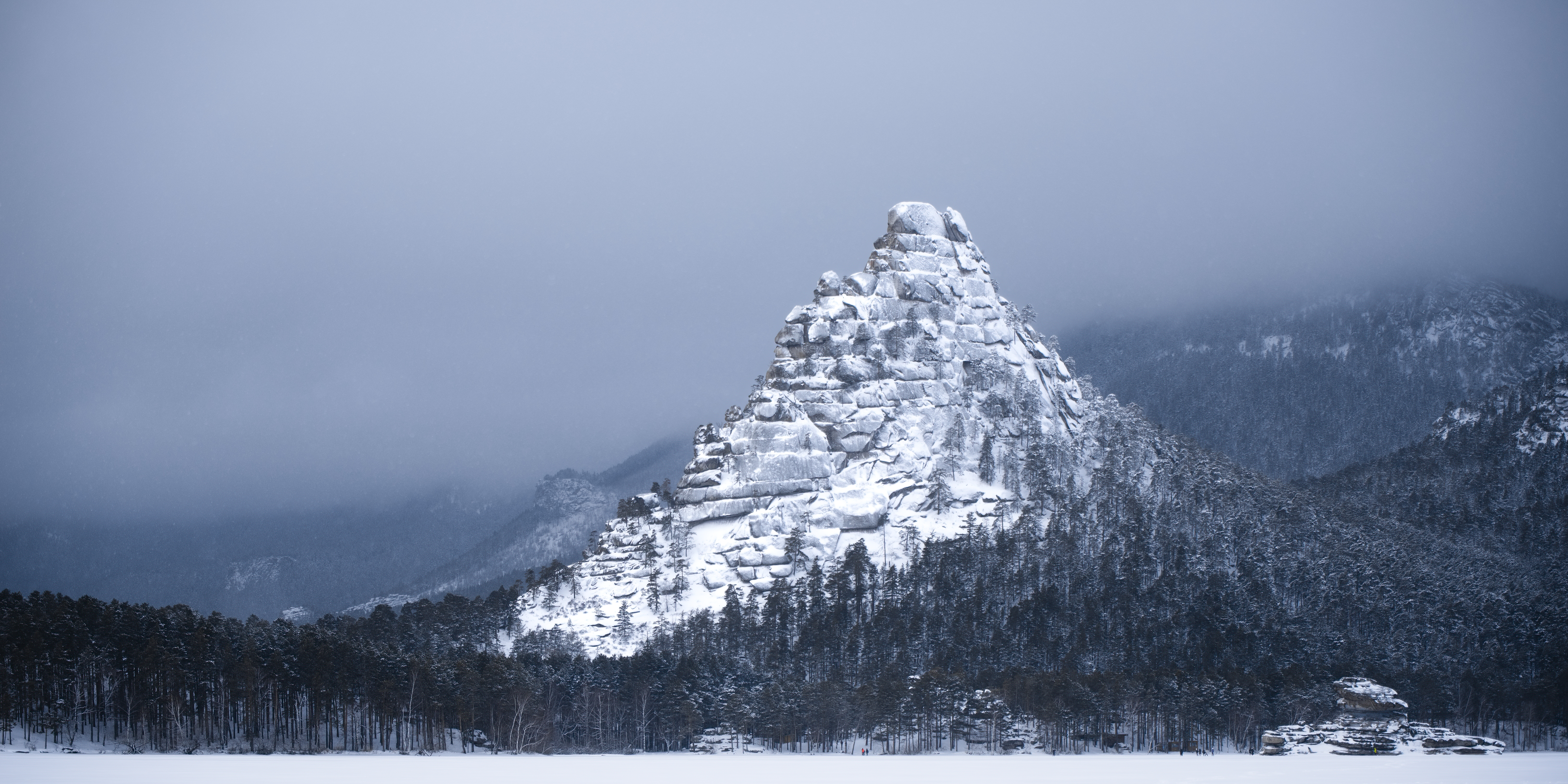
A rocky outcrop rising above the forest.

== Flora ==
The mountain slopes have forests of pine, birch, poplar, except for the rocky tops. There are also some areas of shrub growth. In the valleys at the foot of the mountains there are meadows of wheatgrass, couch grass and bromes, among other grass types. Steppe vegetation is present in the plains surrounding the massif.

== See also ==
- Geography of Kazakhstan
