= Kylshakty =

River in Kazakhstan

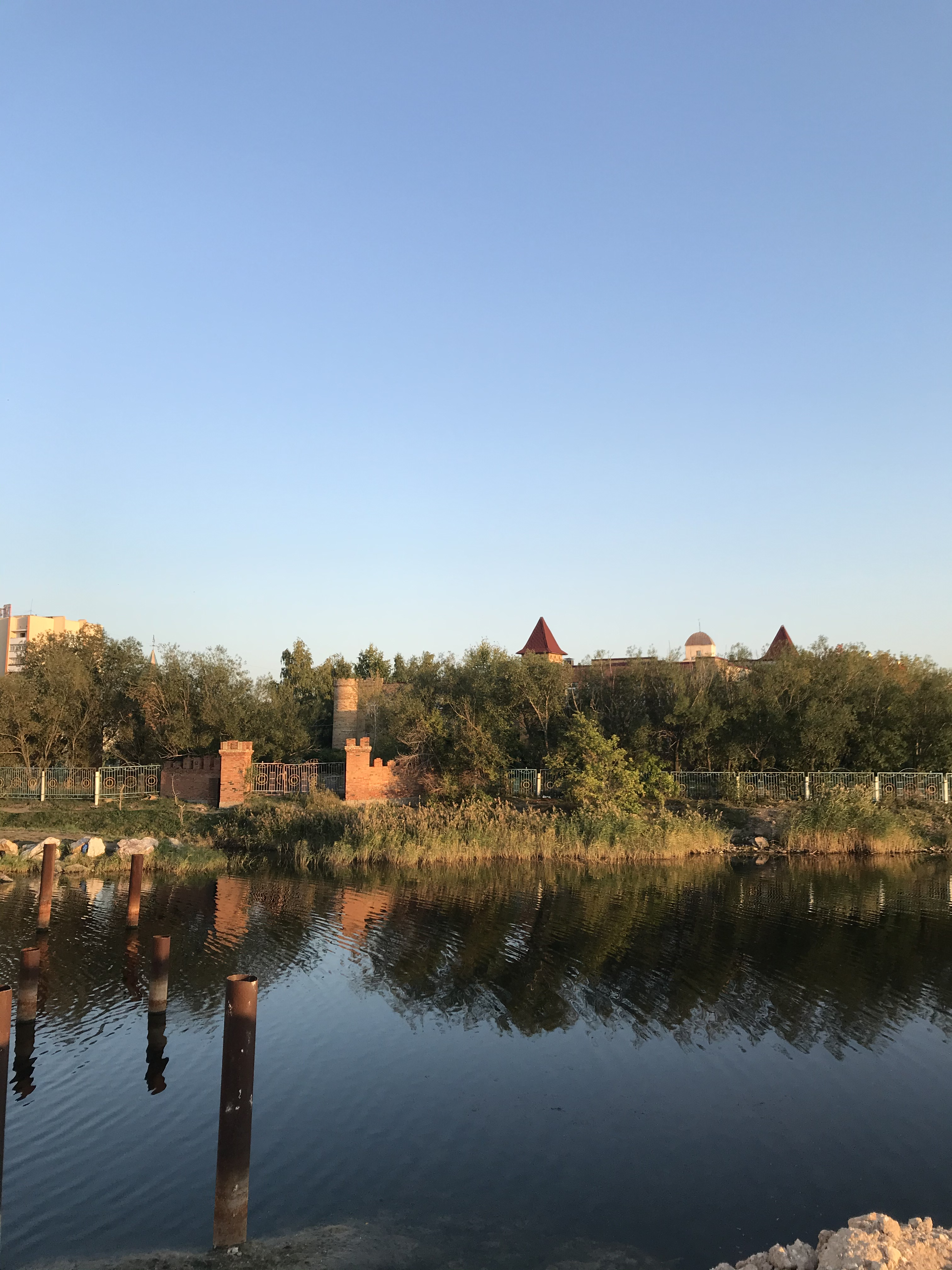
- View of the river in Kokshetau city
- Native name: Қылшақты (Kazakh)

Location
- Country: Kazakhstan

Physical characteristics
- Source: Kokshetau Massif, Kokshetau Hills
  - location: near Shchuchinsk
  - coordinates: 52°55′29″N 70°18′18″E
- Mouth: Lake Kopa
  - coordinates: 53.2911°N 69.3783°E
  - elevation: 223 m (732 ft)
- Length: 104 km (65 mi)
- Basin size: 1,010 km^{2} (390 sq mi)

The Kylshakty (Kazakh: Қылшақты, Qylşaqty) is a river in Northern Kazakhstan that flows through the Akmola Region in Central Kazakhstan. It is 104 km (65 mi) long and has a drainage basin spanning 1,010 km^{2} (390 sq mi). The river is 246 kilometers away from Kazakhstan's capital, Astana.

== Geography ==
The river starts in the Kokshetau Massif, part of the Kokshetau Hills, in a birch forest on Semenov's Hill's western slope, flows west through Shchuchinsk, and bends north toward Frolovsky Pond before bending to the northwest. It crosses Bayanbai and passes two dams before it reaches Kenesary. Finally it flows into Lake Kopa in Kokshetau at an altitude of 223 m (732 ft) above sea level, near the Zhaman-Karakalpak mountain. Lake Zhamantuz is part of the basin of the basin of the Kylshakty river.
