= Kishi Shabakty =

Lake in Kazakhstan

- Кіші Шабақты
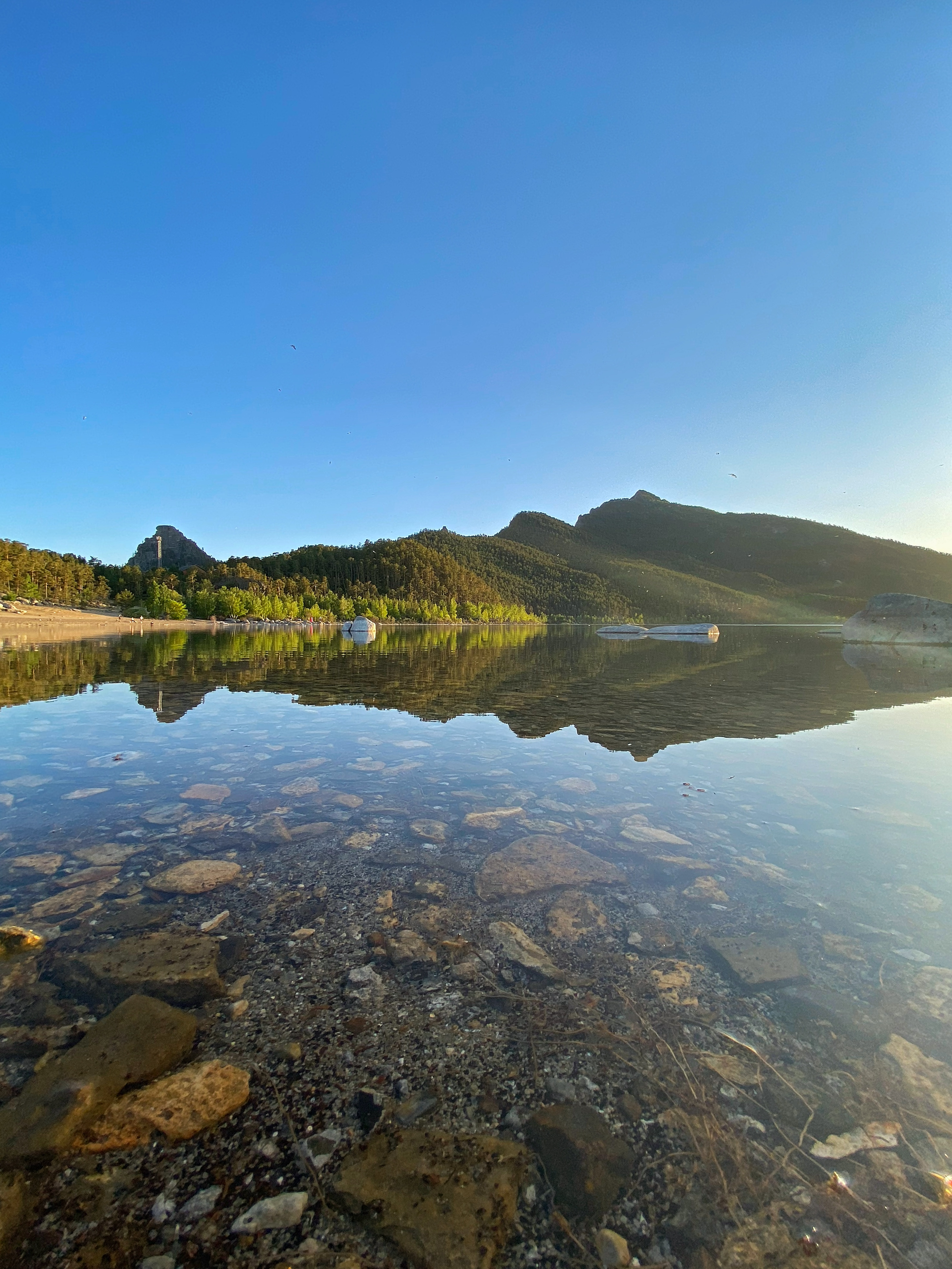
- Panorama of the lake

- Location within Kazakhstan
- Location: Kokshetau Massif, Kokshetau Hills, Kazakh Uplands
- Coordinates: 53°04′N 70°08′E
- Type: endorheic
- Part of: Kokshetau Lakes
- Basin countries: Kazakhstan
- Max. length: 13.6 kilometers (8.5 mi)
- Max. width: 2.7 kilometers (1.7 mi)
- Surface area: 16.8 square kilometers (6.5 sq mi)
- Average depth: 4.68 meters (15.4 ft)
- Max. depth: 15.5 meters (51 ft)
- Water volume: 0.0799 cubic kilometers (0.0192 cu mi)
- Residence time: UTC+6
- Shore length^{1}: 29.2 kilometers (18.1 mi)
- Surface elevation: 395 meters (1,296 ft)
- ^{1} Shore length is not a well-defined measure.

Kishi Shabakty (Kazakh: Кіші Шабақты; Russian: Малое Чебачье, Maloye Chebachye —"Small Chebachye") is a lake in Burabay District, Akmola Region, Kazakhstan.

The lake is part of the Burabay National Park, a protected area.

== Geography ==
Kishi Shabakty lies in the eastern sector of the Kokshetau Lakes, at the northwestern edge of the Kokshetau Massif. Its shape is elongated, stretching roughly from NE to SW for over 13.6 kilometers (8.5 mi). The water of the lake is slightly saline.

A mountain range rises above the southeastern shores of Kishi Shabakty. Lake Ulken Shabakty lies 2.5 kilometers (1.6 mi) to the ENE of the northeastern end and Burabay spa town 7 kilometers (4.3 mi) to the east.

== Flora and fauna ==
Among the fish species living in the lake the native species are crucian carp, Prussian carp, perch, pike and roach. Bream, zander, ripus, peled and muksun have been introduced.

== See also ==
- List of lakes of Kazakhstan
