= Klintsy (inhabited locality) =

Klintsy (Russian: Клинцы, Kazakh: Клинцы) is the name of inhabited localities in Russia and Kazakhstan.

== Kazakhstan ==
- Klintsy, Akmola Region, a village in Burabay District of Akmola Region

== Russia ==
=== Urban localities ===
- Klintsy, a town in Bryansk Oblast; 52°45′N 32°14′E

=== Rural localities ===
- Klintsy, Kaluga Oblast, a village in Duminichsky District of Kaluga Oblast
- Klintsy, Kursk Oblast, a selo in Starshensky Selsoviet of Khomutovsky District in Kursk Oblast
- Klintsy, Orenburg Oblast, a settlement in Pobedinsky Selsoviet of Grachyovsky District in Orenburg Oblast
