= Chudakov =

Chudakov (masculine, Russian: Чудаков) or Chudakova (feminine, Russian: Чудакова) is a Russian patronymic surname derived form the noickname чудак, chudak, 'weirdo'. Notable people with the surname include:

- Aleksandr Yevgenievich Chudakov (1921–2001), Russian physicist
- Aleksandr Pavlovich Chudakov (1938–2005), Russian philologist and writer
- Maria Chudakova (born 1993), Russian beauty queen
- Marietta Chudakova (1937–2021), Russian literary critic and historian
- Nikolai Chudakov (1904–1986), Russian mathematician

== See also ==
- Chudak
