= Lake Ulken Shabakty =

Lake in the Burabay District, Akmola Region, Kazakhstan

Ulken Shabakty
- Үлкен Шабақты
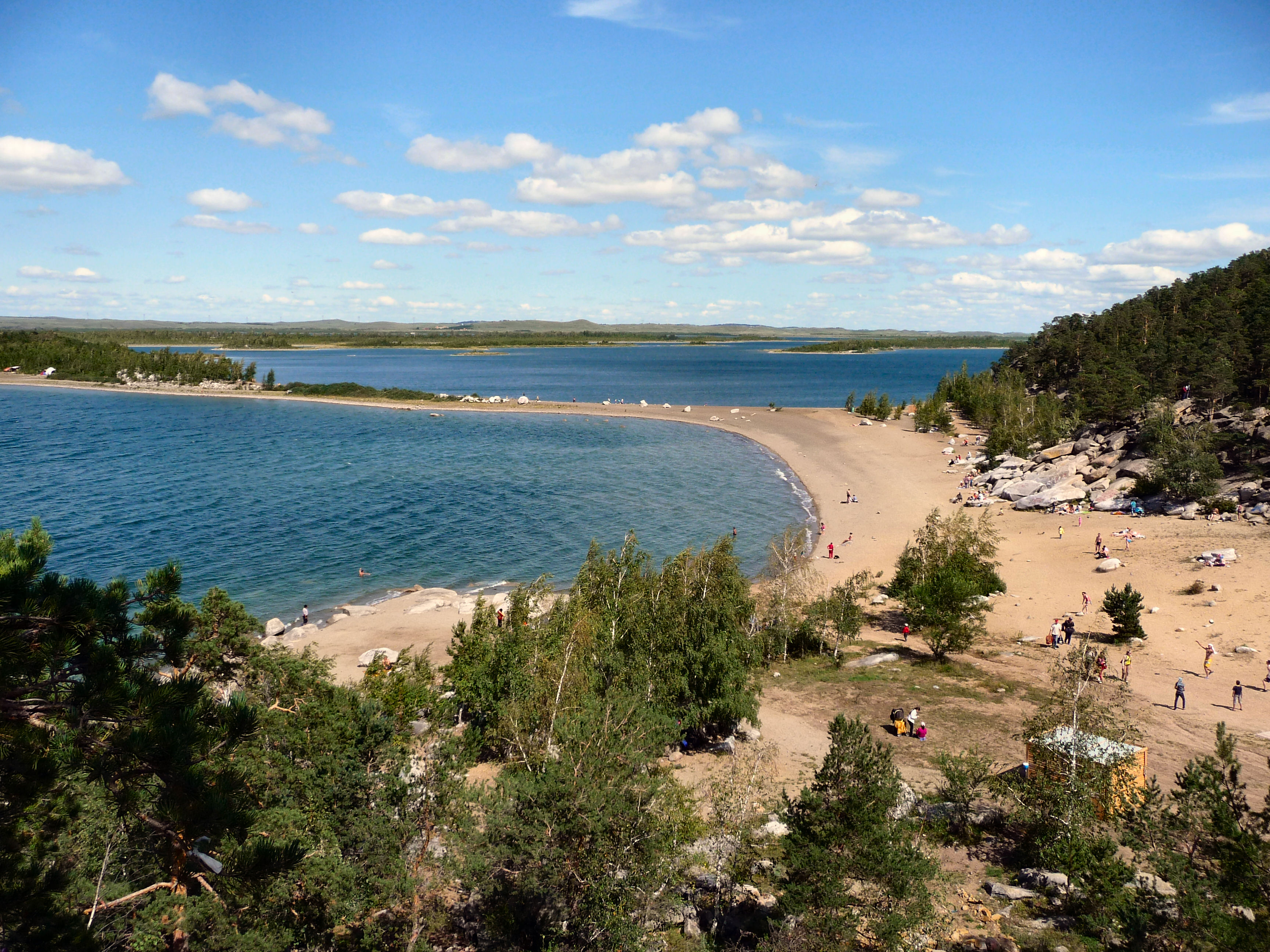

- Location within Kazakhstan
- Location: Kokshetau Hills, Kazakh Uplands
- Coordinates: 53°06′51″N 70°16′23″E
- Type: Tectonic
- Basin countries: Kazakhstan
- Max. length: 8.3 km (5.2 mi)
- Max. width: 5.1 km (3.2 mi)
- Surface area: 25.5 km^{2} (9.8 sq mi)
- Average depth: 11 m (36 ft)
- Max. depth: 33 m (108 ft)
- Residence time: UTC+6
- Surface elevation: 301 m (988 ft)
- Islands: Yes
- Settlements: Burabay

Lake Ulken Shabakty (Kazakh: Үлкен Шабақты, Ülken Şabaqty; Russian: Большое Чебачье) is a lake in the Burabay District, Akmola Region, Kazakhstan. Fishery on the lake is common.

The lake lies by Burabay spa town, in the Shchuchinsk-Borovoye resort zone. It is part of the Burabay National Park, a protected area.

"Ulken Shabakty" means "Big Fish" in the Kazakh language ( "Ulken" - big; "Shabakty" - fish).

== Description ==
Ulken Shabakty is part of the Kokshetau Lakes, Kokshetau Hills, Kazakh Uplands. It is located to the north of lake Burabay. Lake Kishi Shabakty lies 3 km (1.9 mi) to the west, and lake Shchuchye 16 km (9.9 mi) to the SSW. There are a number of islands in the lake. It has an area of 25.5 km^{2} (9.8 sq mi). The average depth of the lake is about 10.8 m (35 ft), with a maximum of 33 m (108 ft). The lake basin is of tectonic origin, with granite rocks lining certain stretches of the shore.

== See also ==
- List of lakes of Kazakhstan
