= Chudak =

Chudak may refer to:

- Andrea Chudak, German soprano
- Bryce Chudak, Canadian pair skater
- Character in the 1961 Soviet film The Man from Nowhere
- Chudak magazine Soviet satire and humor weekly magazine of 1920s

== See also ==
- Chudakov
