= Kokshetau Hills =

Mountain system in Kazakhstan

- Көкшетау қыраты
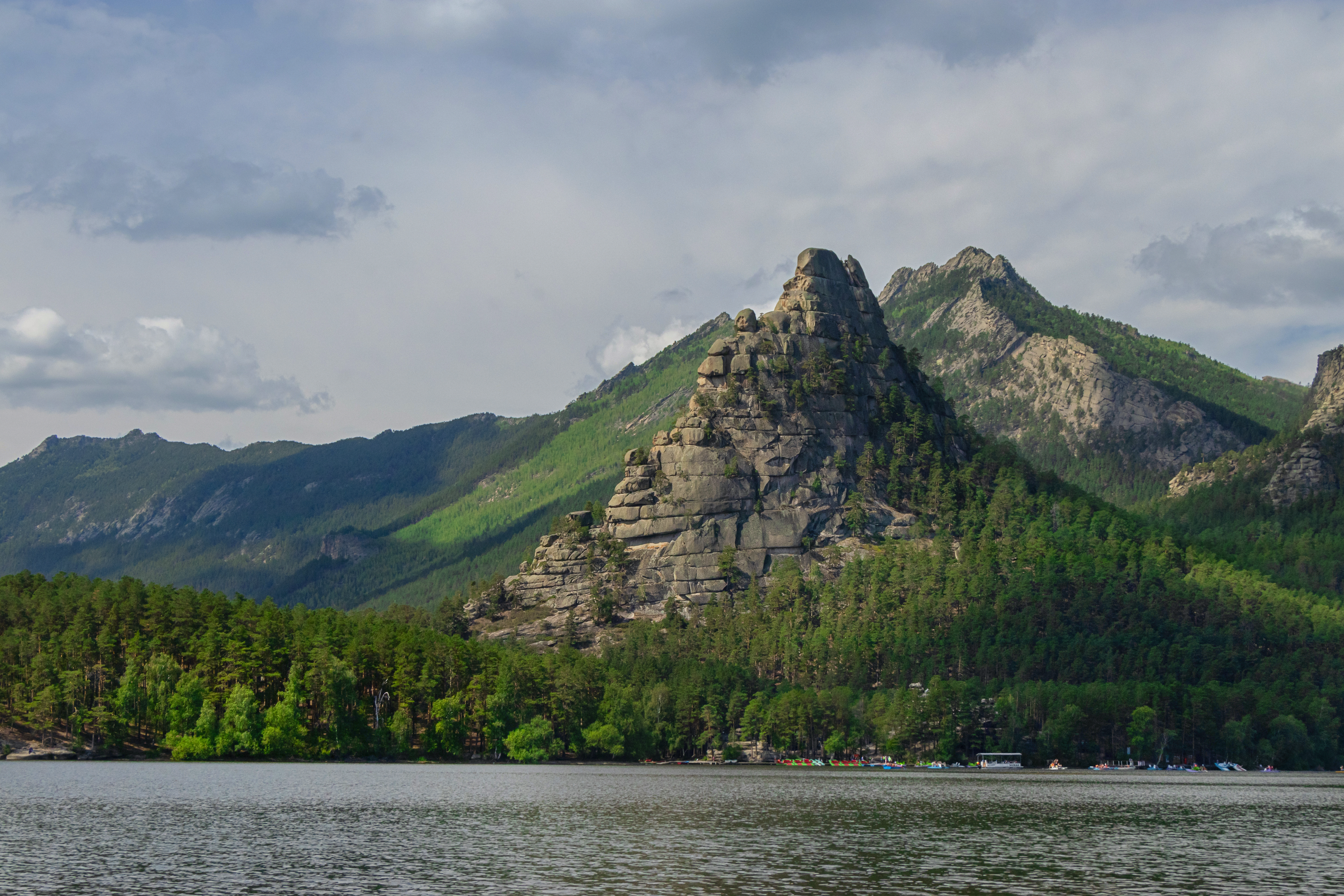
- Landscape of the hill area

Highest point
- Peak: Mount Kokshe
- Elevation: 947 m (3,107 ft)
- Coordinates: 53°04′48″N 70°11′18″E

Dimensions
- Length: 400 km (250 mi) E / W
- Width: 200 km (120 mi) N / S

Geography
- Location within Kazakhstan
- Location: Kazakhstan
- Range coordinates: 53°00′N 69°00′E
- Parent range: Kazakh Uplands

Geology
- Orogeny: Alpine orogeny
- Rock age(s): Devonian and Silurian
- Rock type: Granite

The Kokshetau Hills (Kazakh: Көкшетау қыраты; Russian: Кокшетауская возвышенность) is a system of mountains of moderate altitude in the North Kazakhstan Region and Akmola Region, Kazakhstan.

The cities of Kokshetau, Shchuchinsk and Makinsk are located in the hill zone, as well as the Burabay resort town. The Burabay National Park and the Kokshetau National Park are the main protected areas.

== Geography ==
The Kokshetau Hills are a northern subsystem of the Kazakh Uplands (Saryarka), limited to the north by the West Siberian Plain. They are scattered across a vast area, with wide flat spaces in between of river valleys or lake basins. They stretch for about 400 kilometers (250 mi) between the Turgay Basin in the west and the Sileti valley in the east, with a width of 200 kilometers (120 mi) from north to south. The individual hills and hill clusters rise abruptly from the plains of the intermontane basins. They are generally rocky or have rocky outcrops at the top and there are bizarre rock formations as well.

The elevations are moderate, the highest point is 947 meters (3,107 ft) high Mount Kokshe, also known as Sinyukha, rising in the Kokshetau Massif, located in the northeastern part of the Kokshetau Hills. The Zhaksy-Zhalgyztau (highest point 729 meters (2,392 ft)), Imantau (highest point 621 meters (2,037 ft)) and Ayrtau (highest point 523 meters (1,716 ft)), are the main massifs in the western part, among other smaller and lower ones. The Zhilandi Massif (highest point 654 meters (2,146 ft)) and the Zerendin Mountains (highest point 587 meters (1,926 ft)), are located in the central part. 363 meters (1,191 ft) high Bukpa Hill rises above Kokshetau town and to the southeast rise the Makina Hills (highest point 516 meters (1,693 ft)).

=== Hydrography ===
Numerous rivers originate in the Kokshetau Hills flowing in different directions, such as the Kylshakty, Shagalaly, Iman-Burluk, Akan-Burluk, Zhilandi, Zhabai and Boksyk. Many are part of the Ishim basin. Also hundreds of lakes are located in the numerous tectonic basins of the hill area. The most well-known lakes are those part of the Kokshetau Lakes, a group that includes lakes Burabay, Ulken Shabakty, Kishi Shabakty, Kopa, Zerendi, Shalkar and Imantau.

== Flora ==
The lower slopes of some of the hills are covered with sparse pine forest. Steppe vegetation, including grasses, Artemisia and Ephedra, grows on bare hillsides and in rock crevices. Shrubs are found on scree slopes.

== See also ==
- Geography of Kazakhstan
