= Lake Burabay =

Lake in the country of Kazakhstan

Burabay
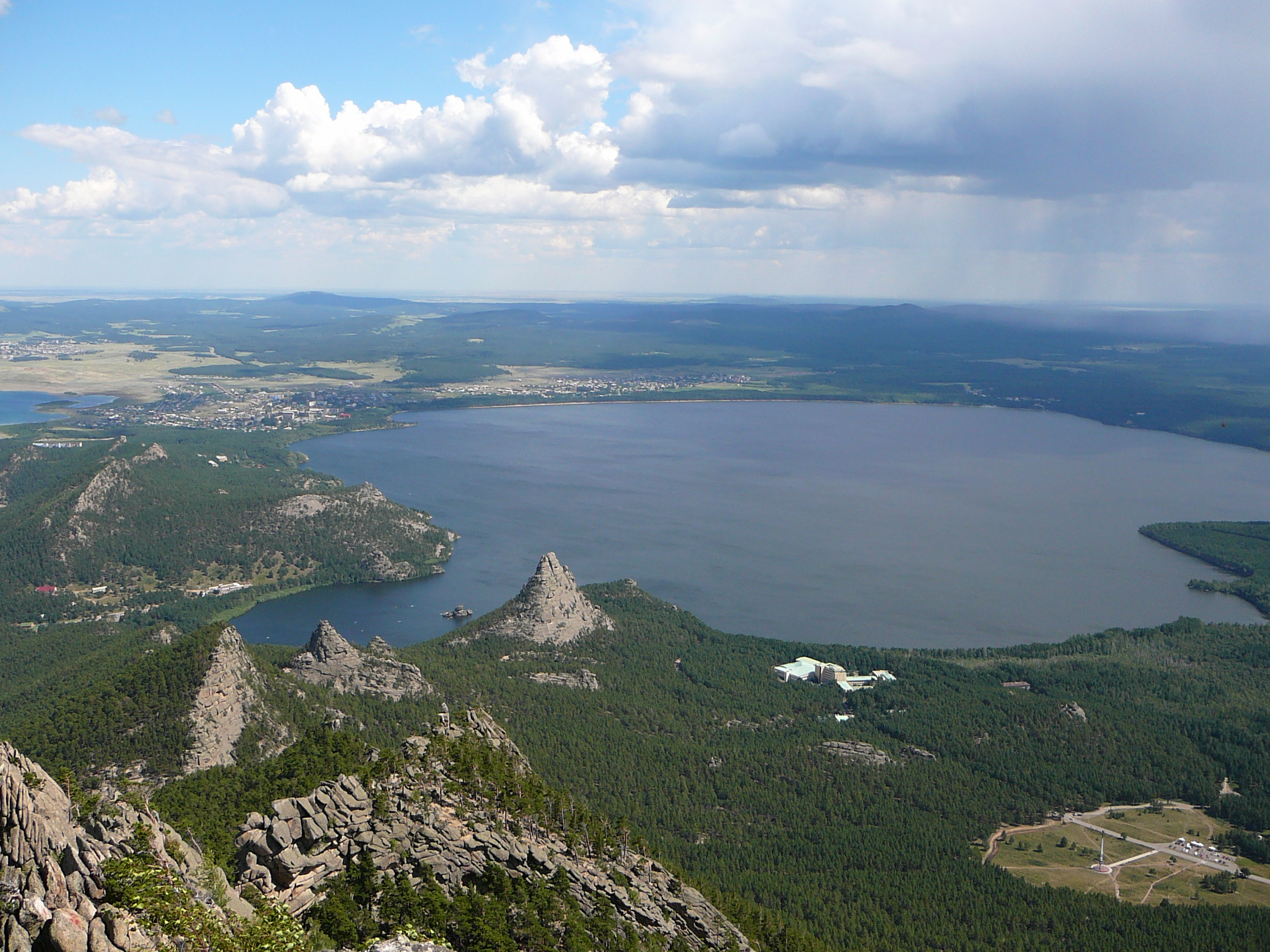

- Location in Kazakhstan
- Location: Akmola Region, Kazakhstan (near Kokshetau)
- Coordinates: 53°04′30″N 70°16′30″E
- Primary inflows: River Sary Bulak, Imanaevskii Stream
- Primary outflows: River Kurkureuk
- Max. length: 4.5 km (2.8 mi)
- Max. width: 3.9 km (2.4 mi)
- Surface area: 11 km^{2} (4.2 sq mi)
- Average depth: 3.4 m (11 ft)
- Max. depth: 7 m (23 ft)
- Water volume: 164 km^{3} (0 cu mi)
- Salinity: 0.1-0.15%
- Shore length^{1}: 13.6 km (8.5 mi)
- Surface elevation: 320.6 m (1,052 ft)
- Islands: 1 (Zhumbaktas)
- Settlements: Burabay
- ^{1} Shore length is not a well-defined measure.

Burabay (Kazakh: Бурабай, Burabai, Russian: Боровое, Borovoye) is a prominent lake of the Kokshetau Lakes, a group of lakes in northern Kazakhstan, located in the Burabay District of Akmola Region, in the eastern part of the Kokshetau Hills.

The name of the lake originates from the word bor, which means "pine forest". The historical name is Auliekol, which means "holy lake".

== Geography ==
The lake is separated from nearby lake Ulken Shabakty to the north by a narrow strip of land. Lake Kishi Shabakty lies 5 km (3.1 mi) to the NW and lake Shchuchye 12 km (7.5 mi) to the SW. The shores of the lake are overgrown with pine forest. The water in the lake is limpid and the bottom can be seen clearly. The water surface of the lake is almost open, only the western and northwestern shores are rushy; the southern shores are rocky, and the eastern shores are sandy. The bottom is flat.

The lake has several capes. Near the northwestern cape, there is a rocky mushroom-shaped island, Jumbaqtas ("Sphinx"), reaching an elevation of 20 metres (66 ft) above the water. Burabay is separated by mountain ranges from the closest lakes. The cliffs and capes of the northwestern and southern coasts create a unique landscape.

The lake water is healing. On the eastern shore, there is the Burabay spa town and the Nature Museum (Табиғат мұражайы). The surrounding area is situated within the Burabay National Park.

== In literature ==
The Kazakh writer Janaidar Musin, in his 1989 book Jer şoqtyğy – Kökşetau ("The Pinnacle of Earth – Kokshetau"), referred to Lake Burabay as Kümisköl, meaning "Silver Lake."

The natural beauty of Burabay is also celebrated in Saken Seifullin’s poem Kokshetau, which vividly portrays the region’s picturesque landscapes and cultural significance:

Burabay water’s more limpid than dew
One cannot withhold admiration its view.
Its shore’s overgrown with glorious trees
Magnificent pines, white birches make scenery splendid indeed.
