= Aleksandr Pavlovich Chudakov =

Alexander Pavlovich Chudakov (Russian: Александр Павлович Чудаков; 2 February 1938 – 3 October 2005) was a Russian philologist and writer, known primarily for his studies of Anton Chekhov. His wife was Marietta Chudakova.

Born in Shchuchinsk, Soviet Kazakhstan, Chudakov prepared, with his own detailed comments, authoritative collections of works by Viktor Shklovsky, Yuri Tynyanov, and other Russian formalists. His autobiographical novel A Gloom is Cast Upon the Ancient Steps (Russian: Ложится мгла на старые ступени) was awarded the Russian Booker Prize of the decade in 2011.

Tragically, in an ironic twist given the novel's title, Chudakov slipped and fell on an unlit staircase, sustaining a fatal head injury in Moscow, Russia.
