= Shchuchinsk =

City in Kazakhstan

- City
- Щучинск
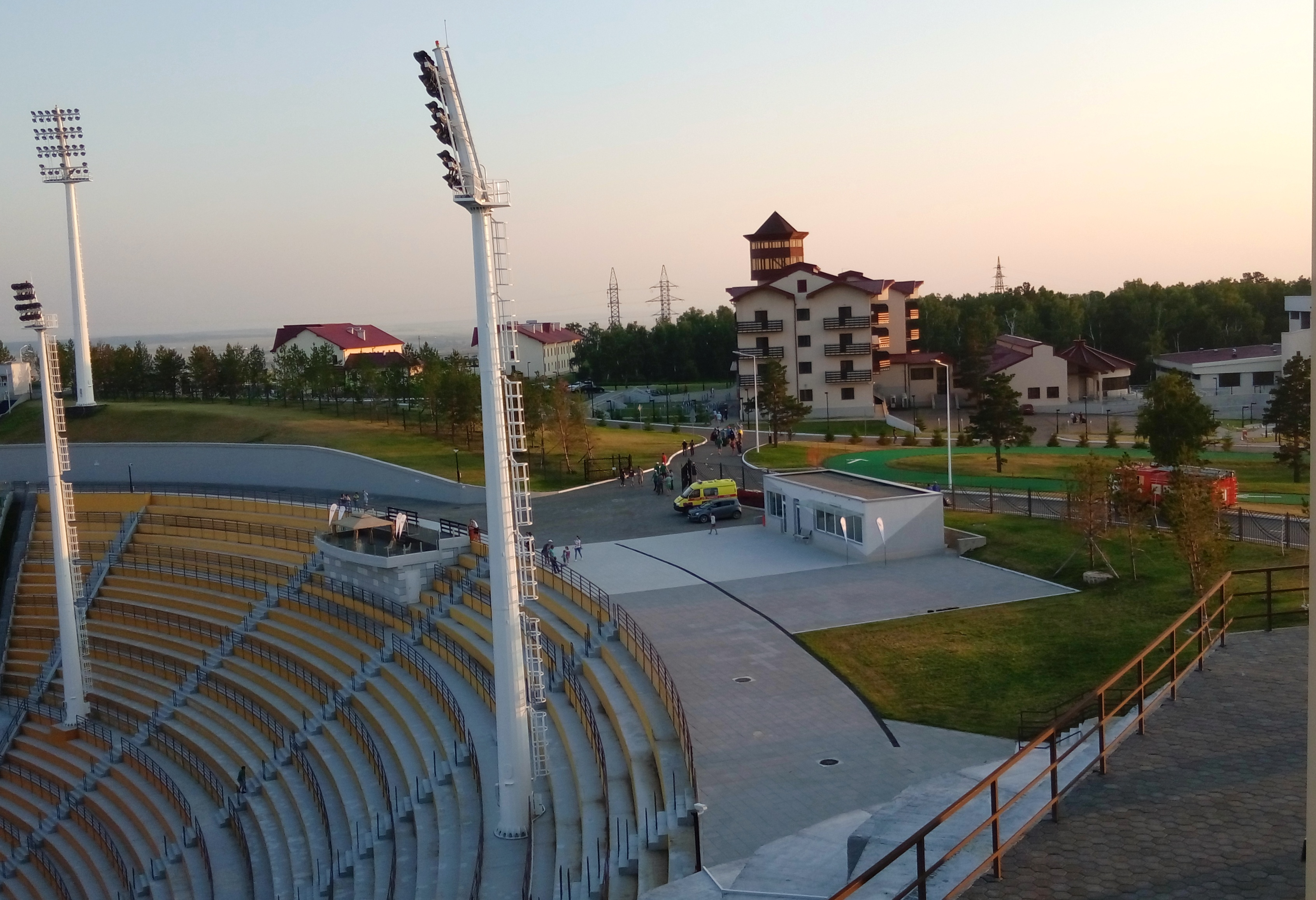

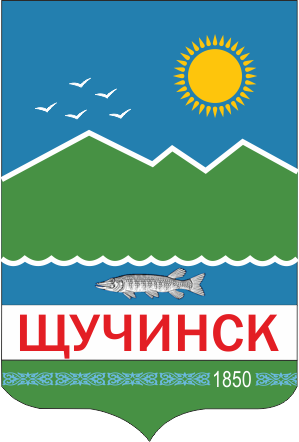
- Coat of arms

- Location within Kazakhstan
- Coordinates: 52°56′N 70°12′E
- Country: Kazakhstan
- Region: Aqmola Region
- District: Burabay District

Population (2012)
  - Total: 45 253
- Time zone: UTC+6 (UTC + 6)
- Postal code: 021700

Shchuchinsk (Kazakh: Щучинск, Şuçinsk; Russian: Щучинск, IPA: [ɕut͡ɕɪnsk]) is a city in northern-central Kazakhstan, located 75 kilometres south-east of Kokshetau on Lake Shchuchye. It is the seat of Burabay District (formerly Shchuchinsk District) in Akmola Region and is the centre of a large agricultural area.

== History ==
Shchuchinsk was founded as a Cossack settlement called firstly as vyselok Shchuchinskiy in 1850. Several years later it became stanitsa Shchuchinskaya.

== Geography ==
Shchuchinsk is located at the feet of the Kokshetau Massif, in the Kokshetau Hills, northern part of the Kazakh Uplands. Burabay spa town lies nearby to the northeast.

=== Climate ===
Shchuchinsk has a warm-summer humid continental climate (Dfb) according to the Köppen climate classification.

Climate data for Shuchinsk (1991–2020)
Month	Jan	Feb	Mar	Apr	May	Jun	Jul	Aug	Sep	Oct	Nov	Dec	Year
Mean daily maximum °C (°F)	−11.0 (12.2)	−9.1 (15.6)	−2.1 (28.2)	10.4 (50.7)	19.3 (66.7)	23.9 (75.0)	24.5 (76.1)	23.1 (73.6)	16.8 (62.2)	8.7 (47.7)	−2.9 (26.8)	−9.1 (15.6)	7.7 (45.9)
Daily mean °C (°F)	−15.9 (3.4)	−14.8 (5.4)	−7.4 (18.7)	4.2 (39.6)	12.3 (54.1)	17.4 (63.3)	18.5 (65.3)	16.7 (62.1)	10.4 (50.7)	3.3 (37.9)	−7.0 (19.4)	−13.5 (7.7)	2.0 (35.6)
Mean daily minimum °C (°F)	−21.0 (−5.8)	−20.1 (−4.2)	−12.6 (9.3)	−1.6 (29.1)	5.1 (41.2)	10.5 (50.9)	12.5 (54.5)	10.5 (50.9)	4.4 (39.9)	−1.5 (29.3)	−10.9 (12.4)	−18.2 (−0.8)	−3.6 (25.6)
Average precipitation mm (inches)	14.6 (0.57)	11.9 (0.47)	15.7 (0.62)	22.3 (0.88)	32.4 (1.28)	41.6 (1.64)	82.1 (3.23)	41.9 (1.65)	26.0 (1.02)	25.8 (1.02)	21.4 (0.84)	16.5 (0.65)	352.2 (13.87)
Average precipitation days (≥ 1.0 mm)	4.6	4.0	4.3	5.0	6.7	7.5	9.9	7.3	5.4	6.2	6.0	5.2	72.1
Mean monthly sunshine hours	99.7	132.0	187.5	236.6	300.5	315.4	302.5	273.3	205.8	139.3	83.0	73.2	2,348.8
Source: World Meteorological Organization,

== Sport ==
A notable sports center of the city is the National Ski Center, with two modern olympic ski jumping hills, large (K125) and normal (K90), 16 FIS cross-country ski courses and a biathlon stadium, which was opened in July 2018.

Shchuchinsk is known for its many notable athletes. That includes:

- Nikolay Chebotko (1982–2021), Kazakh cross-country skier, bronze medalist World Ski Championship 2013.
- Svetlana Kapanina (born 1968), Russian world women's aerobatic champion, most celebrated woman pilot in history.
- Yevgeniy Koshevoy (born 1984), Kazakh cross-country skier.
- Alina Raikova (born 1991), Kazakh biathlete
- Vladimir Smirnov (born 1964), Kazakh cross-country skier, Olympic champion 1994.
- Yevgeniy Velichko (born 1987), Kazakh cross-country skier.

== Notable people ==
Other notable people of Shchuchinsk include:

- Alexander Chudakov (1938–2005), Russian philologist and writer.
- Sergei Odintsov (born 1959), Russian astrophysicist.
- Dmytro Vasyliev (1904–1980), Soviet Ukrainian architect.

== Twin towns ==
- Jermuk, Armenia
