= Burabay =

Burabay Бурабай
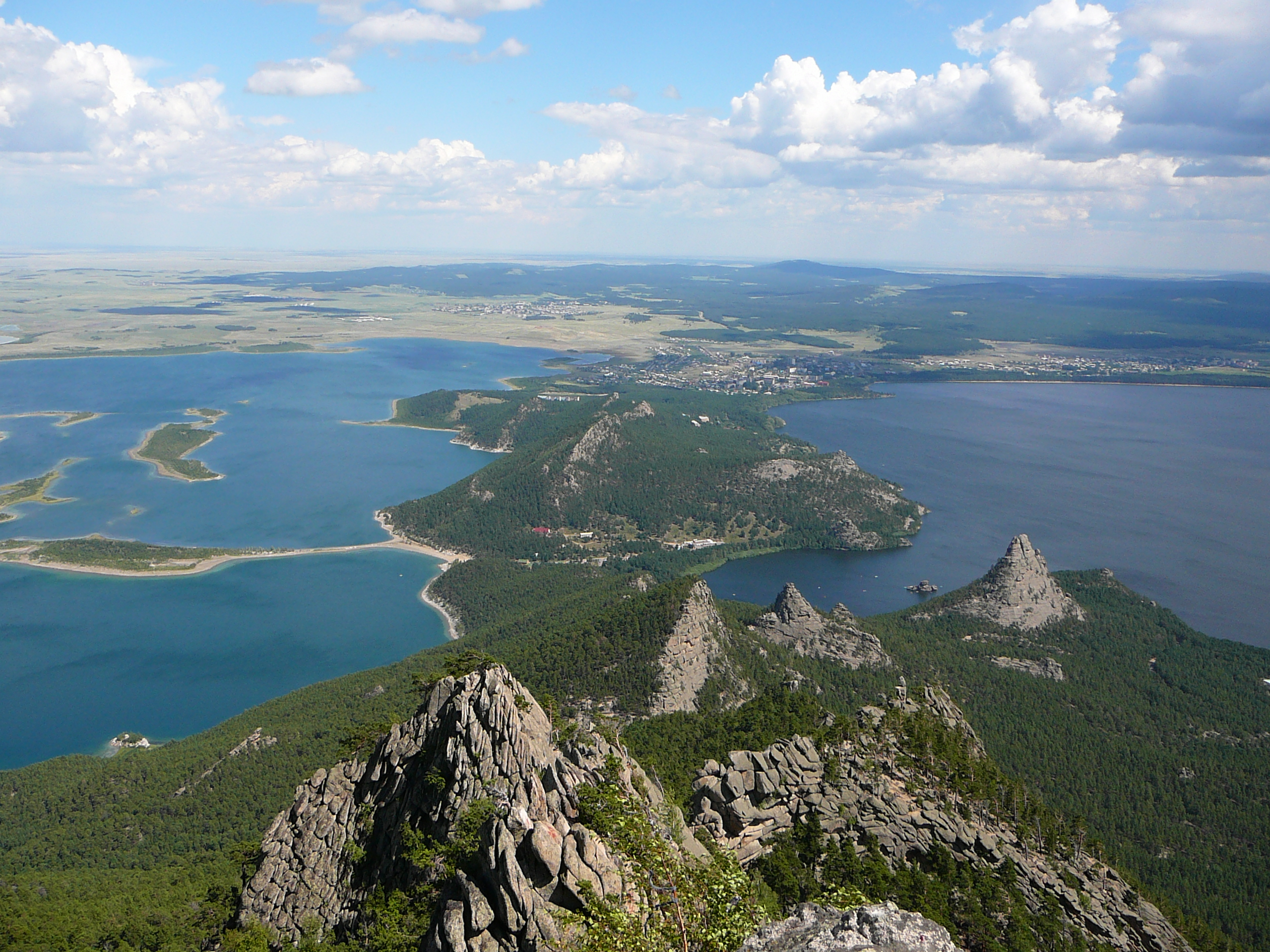
- View of Burabay between the two lakes

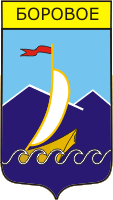
- Coat of arms

- Location in Kazakhstan
- Coordinates: 53°05′14″N 70°18′00″E
- Country: Kazakhstan
- Region: Akmola Region
- District: Burabay District
- Established: 1910
- Elevation: 1,570 ft (480 m)

Population (2012)
  - Total: 5,800
- Time zone: UTC+6
- Postcode: 021708

Burabay (Kazakh: Бурабай), formerly Borovoye, is a settlement in Burabay District, Akmola Region, Kazakhstan. It is the administrative center of the Burabay rural district (KATO code - 117035100). Population: 4,225 (2009 census results); 5,523 (1999 census results).

Burabay is a spa town. The surrounding area is part of the Burabay National Park.

== Geography ==
Burabay lies in the Kokshetau Massif, part of the Kokshetau Hills of the Kazakh Uplands. The town is located in the strip of land between lakes Burabay and Ulken Shabakty.

== See also ==
- Kokshetau Lakes
