= Burabay National Park =

National park in Kazakhstan

Burabay State National Nature Park
- «Бурабай» мемлекеттік ұлттық табиғи паркі (Kazakh); Государственный национальный природный парк «Бурабай» (Russian)
- IUCN category II (national park)
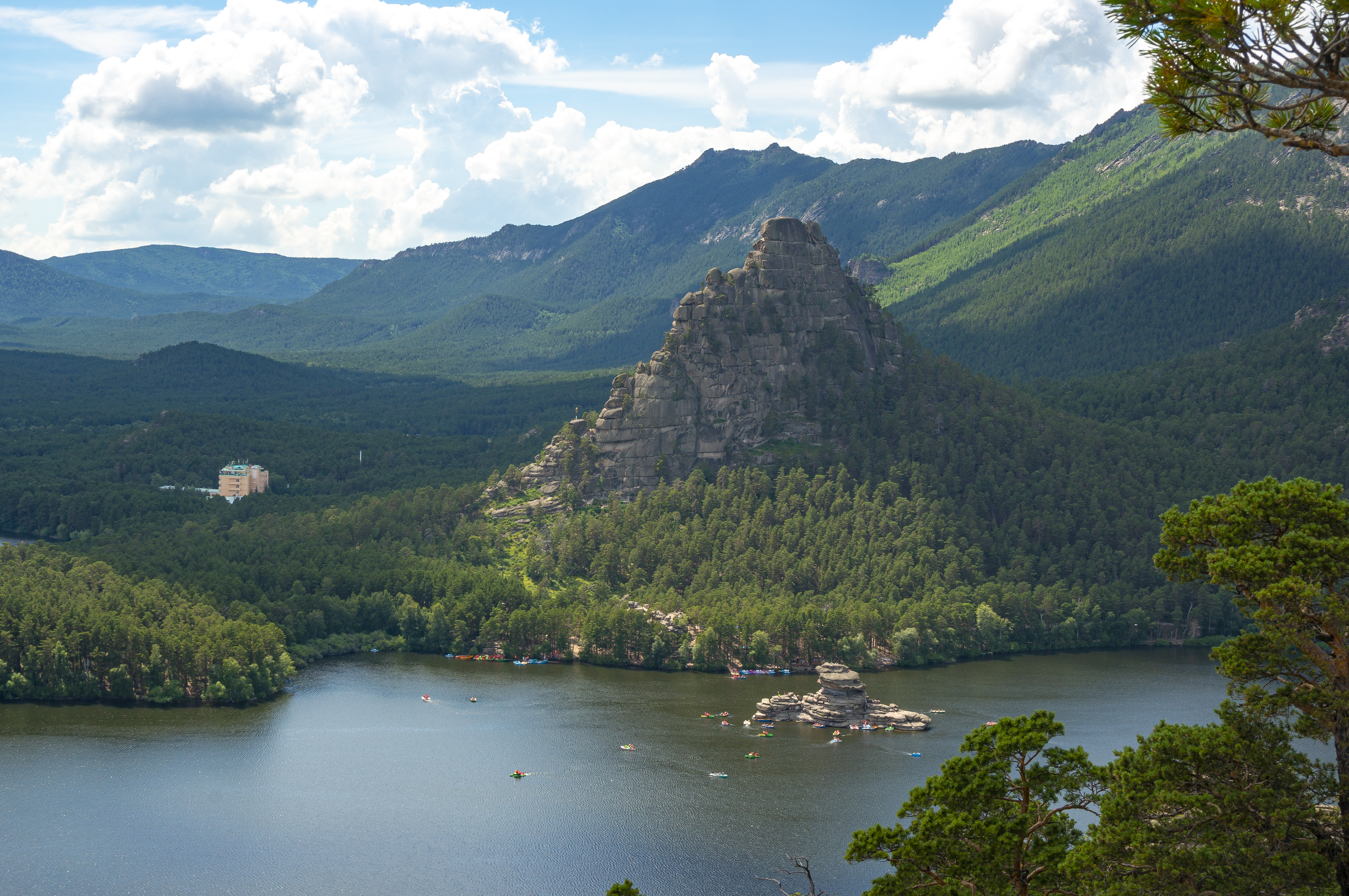

- Location within Kazakhstan
- Location: Aqmola Region, Kazakhstan
- Nearest city: Shchuchinsk, Kokshetau, Nur-Sultan
- Coordinates: 53°05′00″N 70°18′00″E
- Area: 83,511 hectares (206,360 acres)
- Established: 1 June 1935 (nature reserve); 12 August 2000 (national park)
- Governing body: Under the responsibility of the President of Kazakhstan

The Burabay State National Nature Park (Kazakh: «Бурабай» мемлекеттік ұлттық табиғи паркі, romanized: «Burabai» memlekettık ūlttyq tabiği parkı; Russian: Государственный национальный природный парк «Бурабай», romanized: Gosudarstvennyy natsional'nyy prirodnyy park «Burabay») is a national park located in Burabay District, Aqmola Region, Kazakhstan, which covers 129,935 hectares, with a significant portion of the land covered by forests, lakes, and diverse landscapes, including the Kokshetau Massif, part of the Kokshetau Hills.

The Burabay National Park has a rich history, starting with the establishment of a state forest in 1898. Over the years, it evolved from a nationalized spa town in 1920 to the National Nature Reserve of Burabay in 1935. In 2000, it officially became a national park, with the area expanded in 2010. The park features a variety of ecosystems, including forests, lakes, and steppes, and is home to a diversity of flora and fauna. The Burabay National Park is home to 757 species of plants, including many protected species, and 305 species of animals, some of which are listed in Kazakhstan's Red Book. The forest is predominantly made up of pines and birches, with many species of deer, wild boars, lynxes, wolves, and various bird species, including ducks, geese, and capercailies.

A popular feature of the park is Kenesary Cave, named after Kenesary Khan, the grandson of Ablai Khan, which is believed to have been his childhood residence. The Burabay National Park is also associated with numerous legends, giving rise to Burabay, often referred to as "Kazakhstan's pearl".

Being recognized as one of the top tourist destinations in Kazakhstan, the Burabay National Park is directly managed under the jurisdiction of the President of Kazakhstan and is considered a significant protected area, with activities in the park regulated to preserve its natural and ecological integrity.

== Geography ==
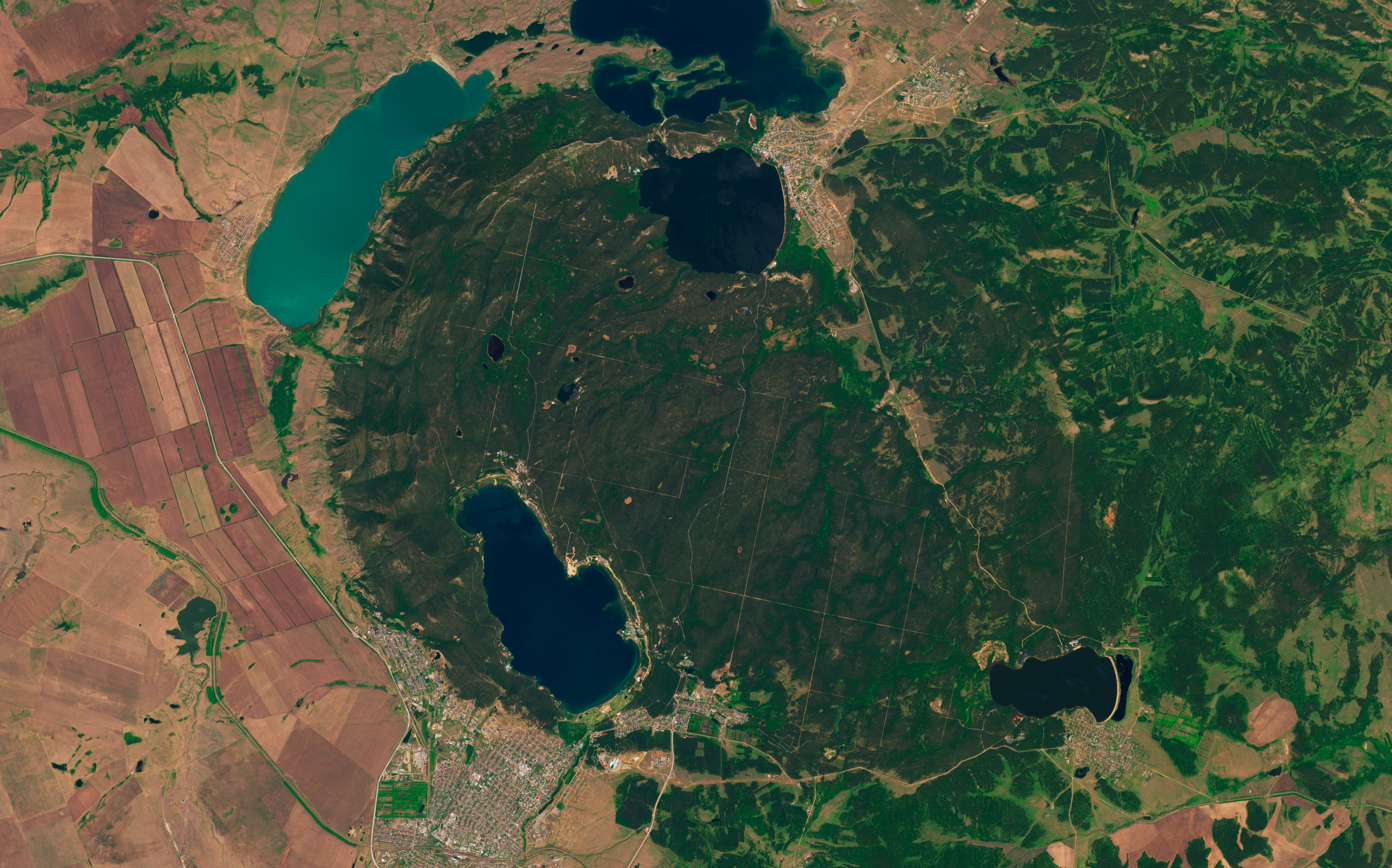
A satellite image of the Burabay National Park (Sentinel-2 L1C data, modified)

The Burabay National Park is located in the Kokshetau Massif, part of the Kokshetau Hills, in the northern sector of the Kazakh Uplands.

== History of status ==
The first step towards the protection of this natural space was the establishment of the State Forest in 1898. In 1920, Burabay was nationalized and declared a spa town of national importance. In 1935, the "National Nature Reserve of Burabay" was organized. In 1951, the nature reserve was dissolved, replaced by the Burabay Forest. The governmental motion N° 787 of May 6, 1997, transformed the Forest of Burabay into the "Natural and Well-being Complex of the Forest of Burabay", managed by the State. In 2000, the motion N°1246 of August 12 created the "National nature park of Burabay", which covered an area of 83,511 ha, of which 47,600 ha was covered in forest. In 2010, the area of the park was expanded to 129,935 ha. In 2012, 370 ha was converted into spare lands.

== Climate ==
The climate of Burabay is Humid continental climate, warm summer (Köppen climate classification (Dfb)). This climate is characterized by large seasonal temperature differentials and a warm summer (at least four months averaging over 10 °C (50 °F), but no month averaging over 22 °C (72 °F)). The average temperature in the park in January is −16 °C, and +19 °C in July. Precipitation averages around 300 mm yearly. In winter, snow cover is around 25–35 cm thick, and lasts from mid-November to April.

== Flora, fauna, and funga ==
The park contains 757 species of plant, of which 119 are protected, and 12 registered in the Red Book. The forest comprises 65% pines, 31% birches, 3% aspens and 1% shrubs. Many species of edible mushroom can also be found.

Due to the diversity of the flora, the fauna is very abundant: 305 species of animal can be found, which represent 36% of the fauna diversity of Kazakhstan. 40% of them live at the border of their habitat, and 13 species are registered in the Red Book.

Currently, Burabay's forests host a variety of deer including roe deer, moose, wild boar, squirrels, stoats, weasel and marten. Amongst the predators, wolves and lynx might be encountered. In the steppes and wooded areas, fox species, weasels and European and mountain hares might be present, as well as badgers in the forests.

There are a variety of birds, particularly ducks and waders which include common goldeneye, mallard, gadwall, northern pintail, ruddy shelducks, plovers, northern lapwings, common sandpipers and green sandpipers. Ducks numbers rise massively during autumn and during migration periods.

In the dry stony pine forests, and along the forests, the birch wooden steppes, the grey partridge and the capercailie can be found.

== Legend ==
Many legends evoke Burabay. One of them explains that the Creator only left arid steppes to the nomads of Kazakhstan. Feeling aggrieved, the Kazakh people prayed to God, who gathered all the remaining mountains, forests, lakes and rivers, and threw them towards the steppes. Burabay National Park is also known as "Kazakhstan's pearl".

== Kenesary Cave ==
Kenesary Cave is a popular tourist destination and photo spot in Burabay. The cave is named after the grandson of the famous Ablai Khan, Kenesary Khan. It is believed that Kenesary Khan spent his childhood here.

== Gallery ==
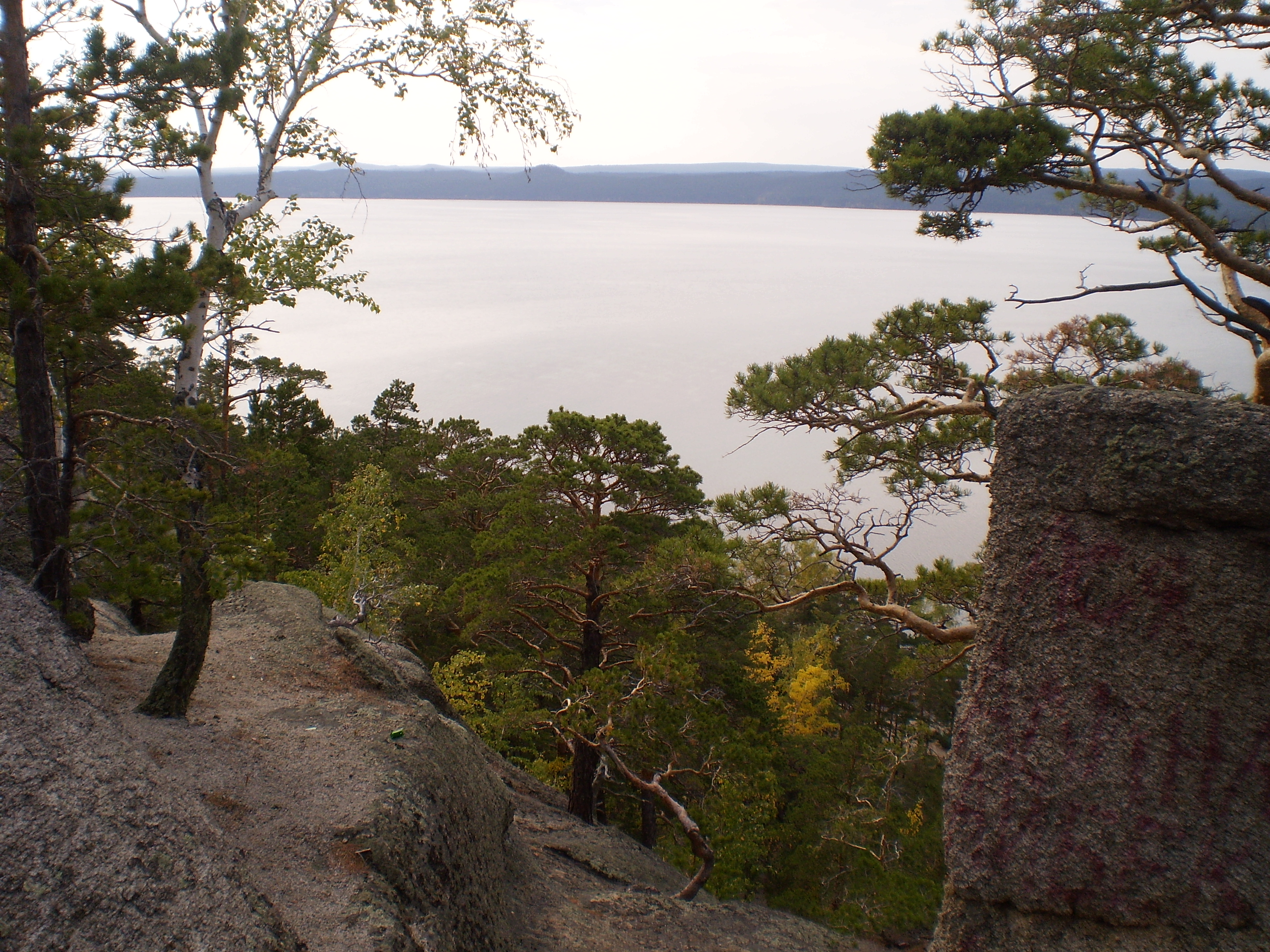

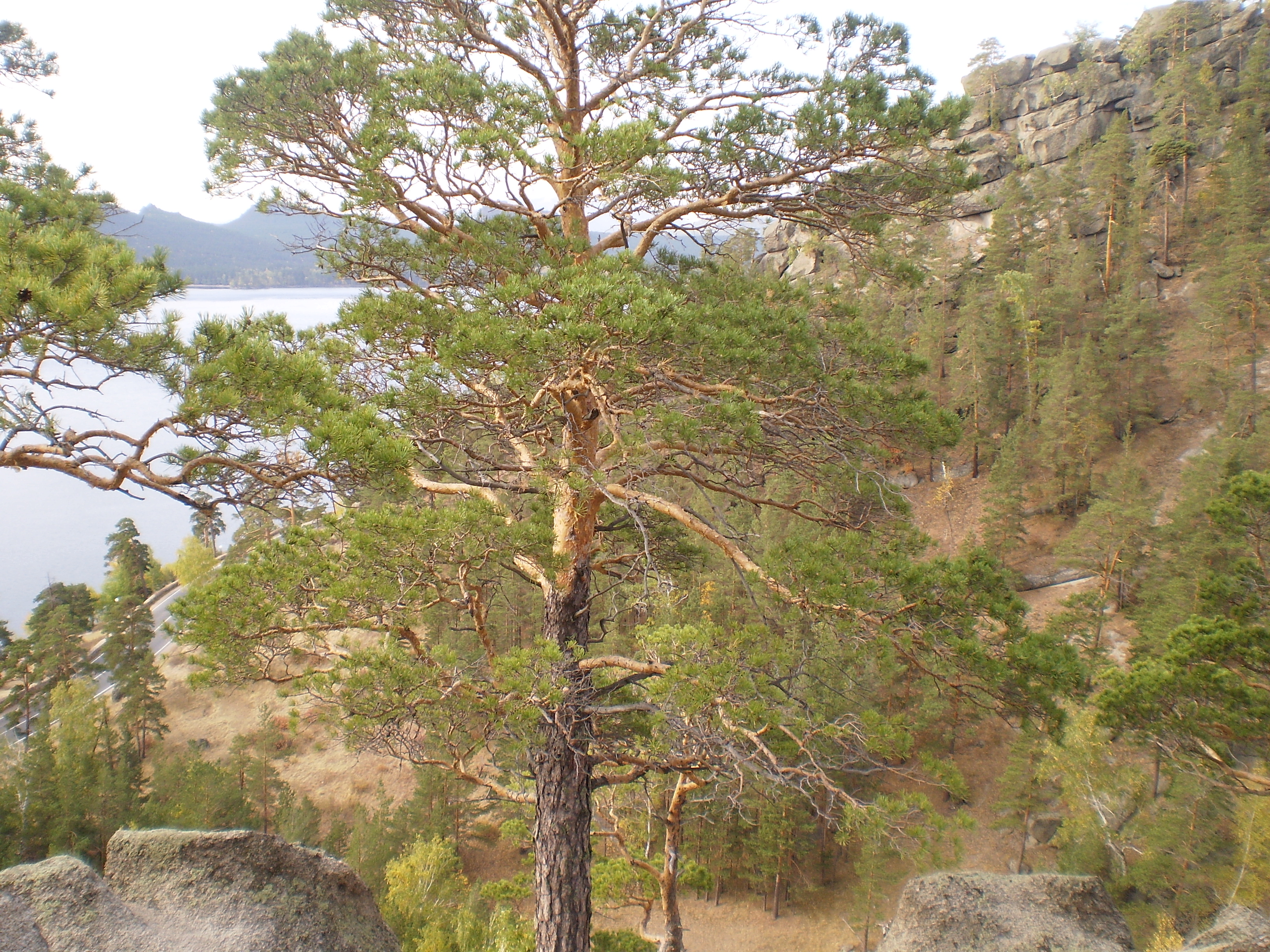

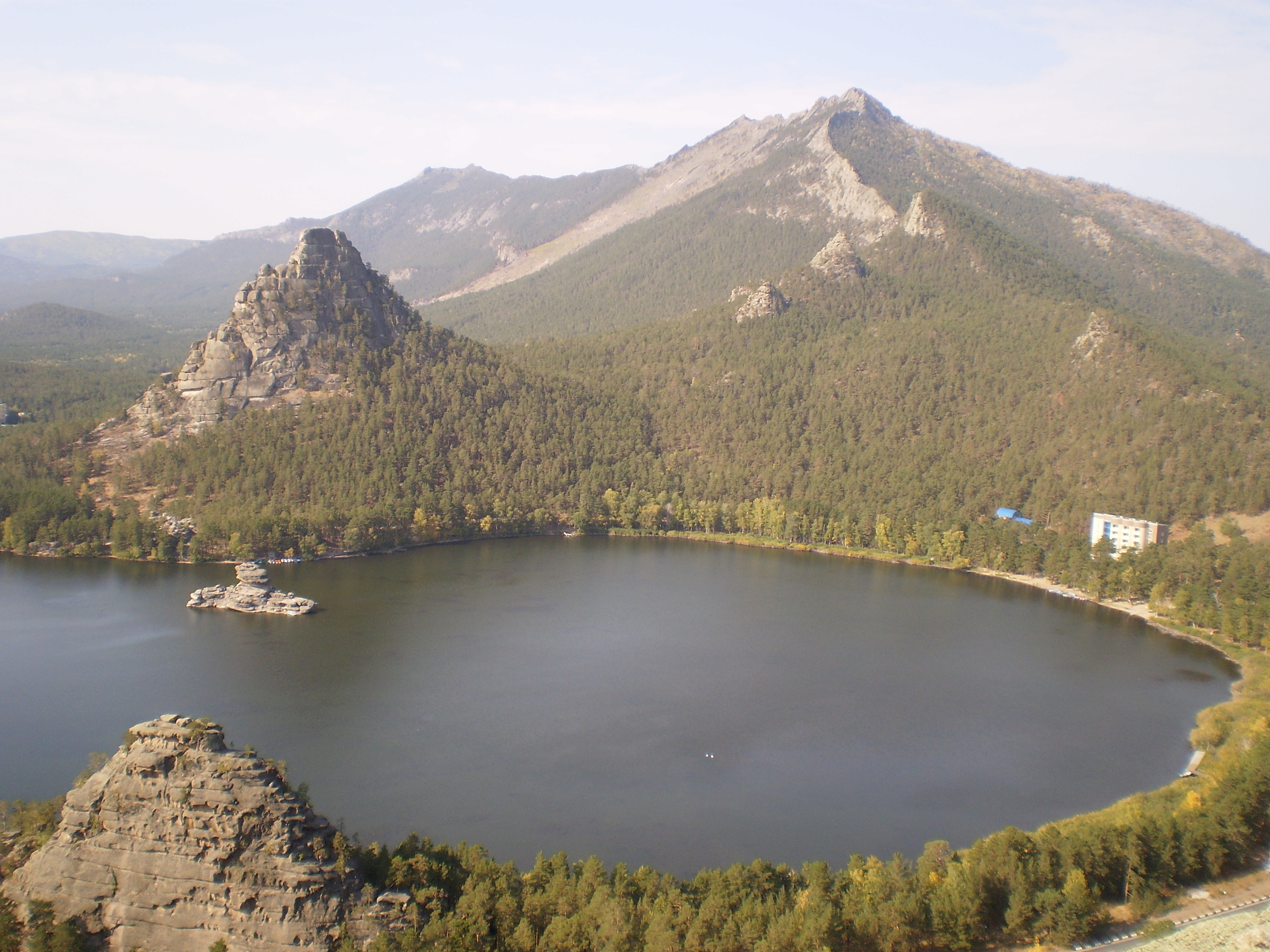

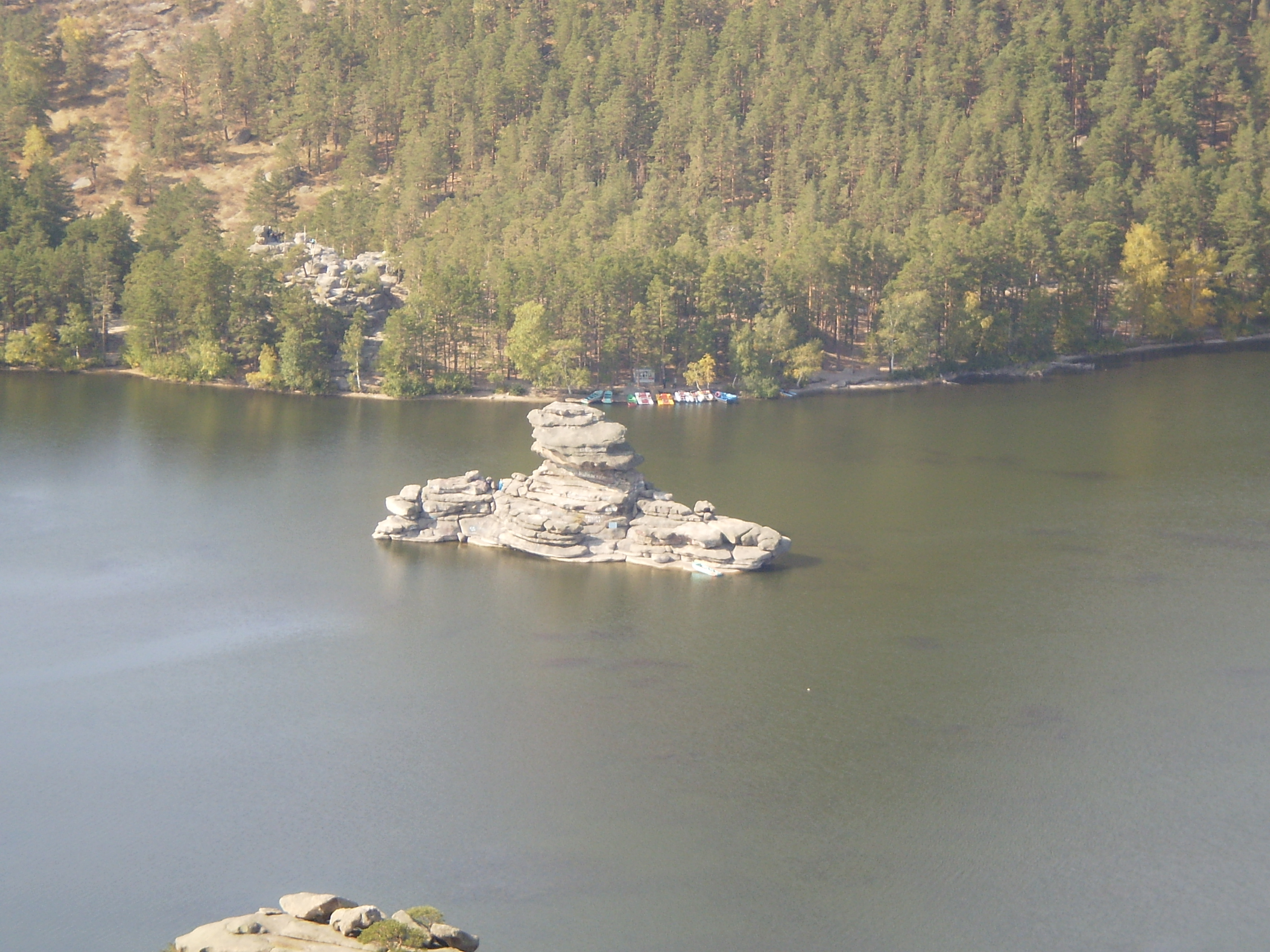

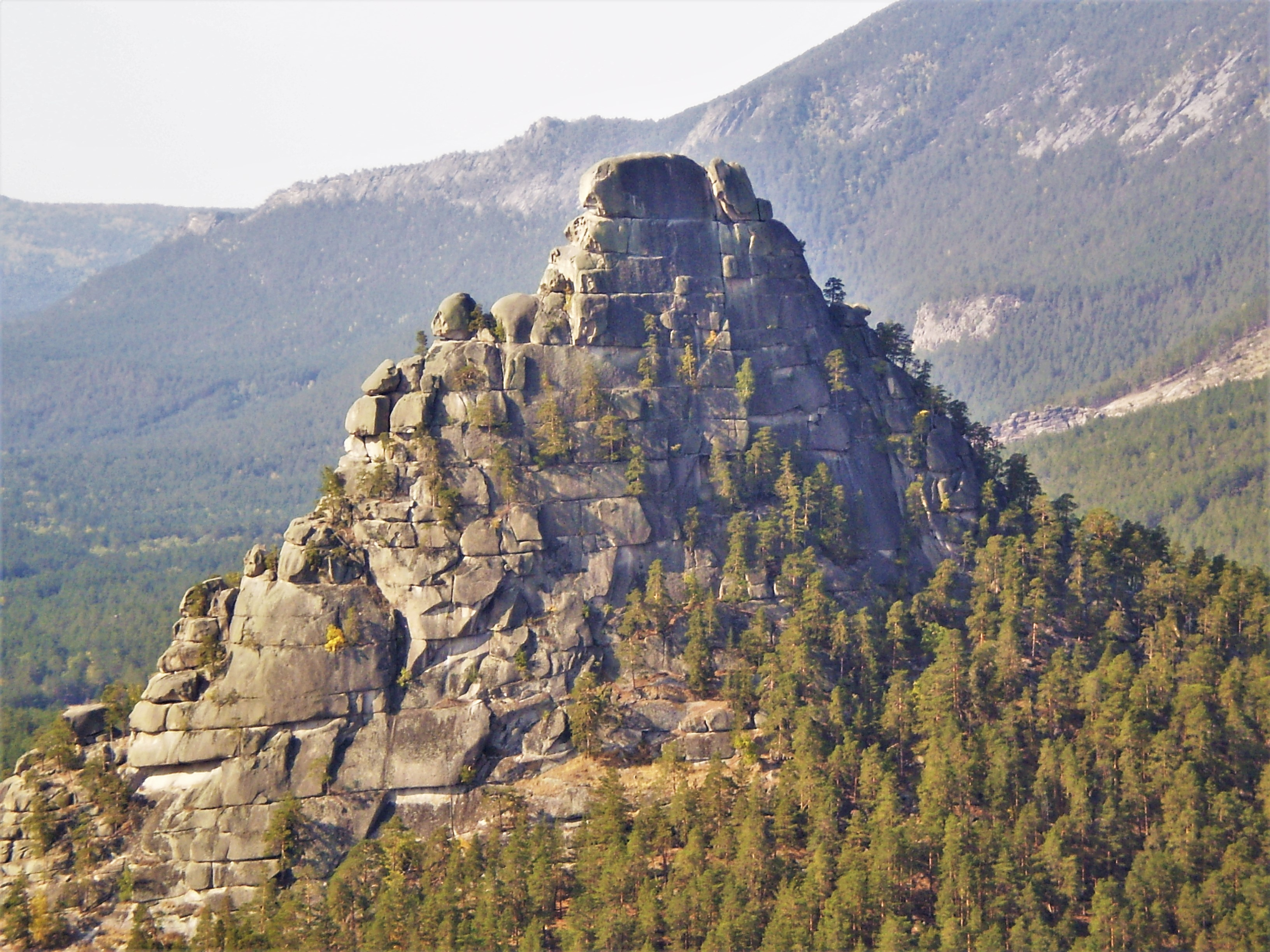

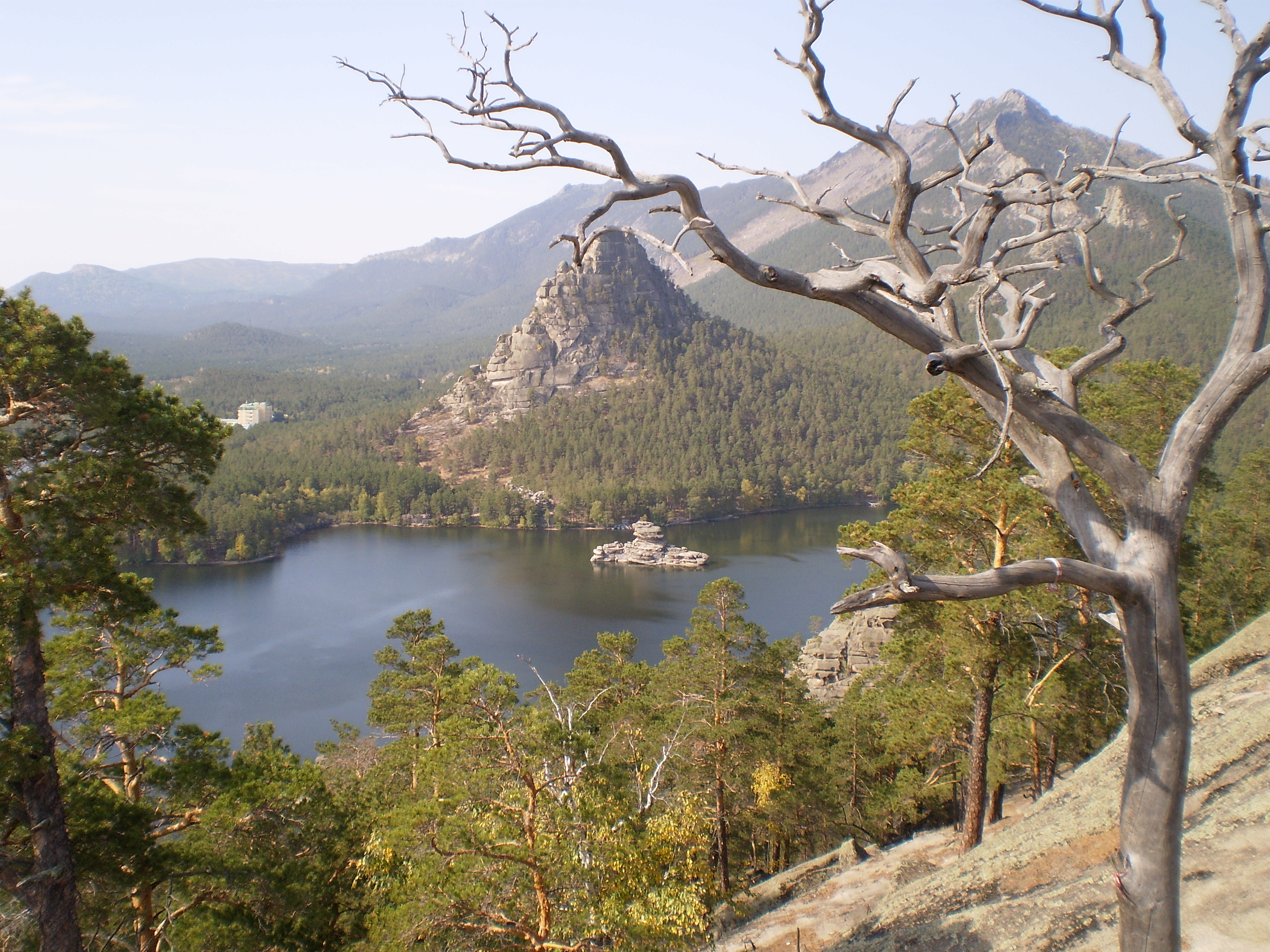

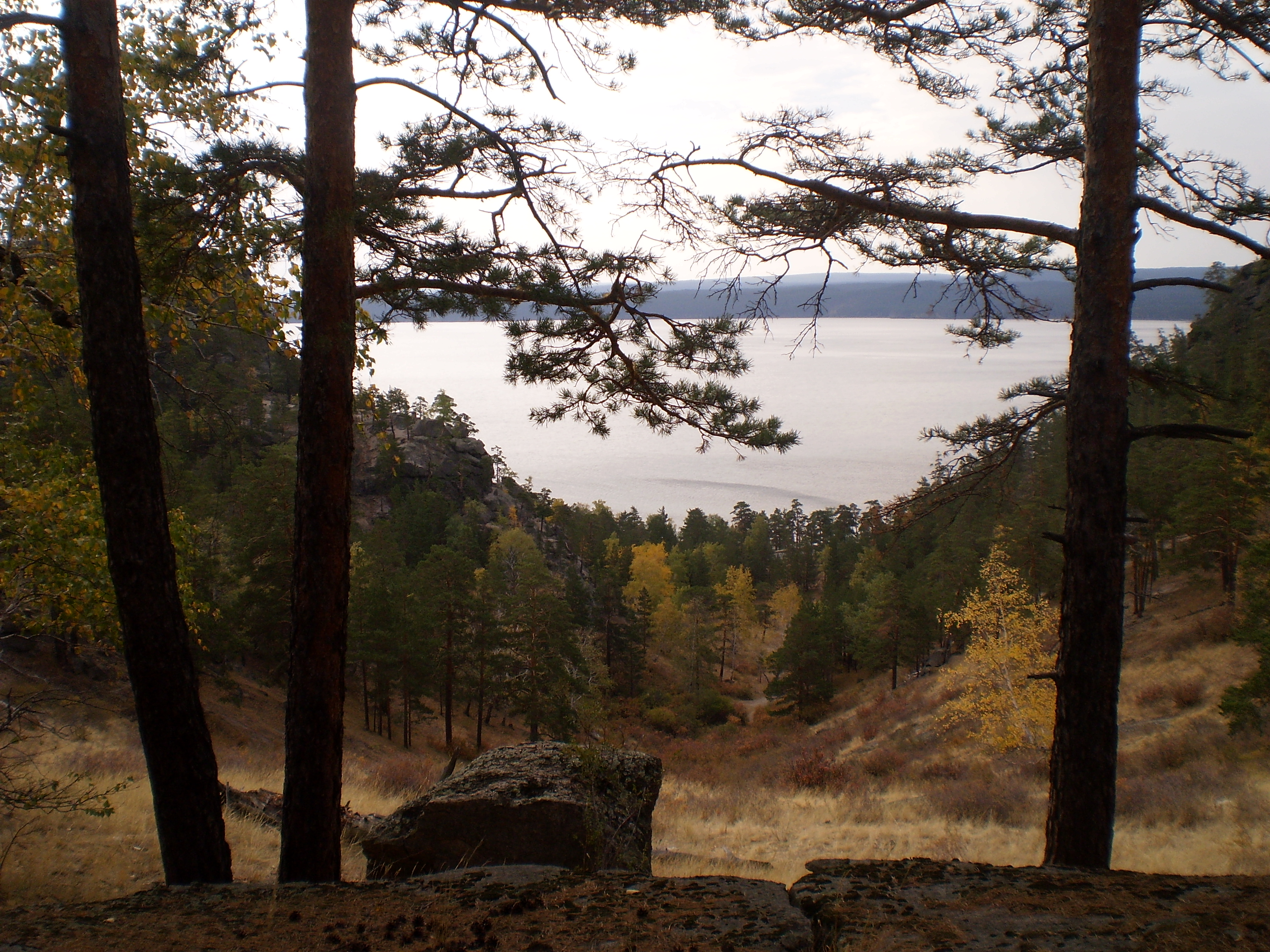

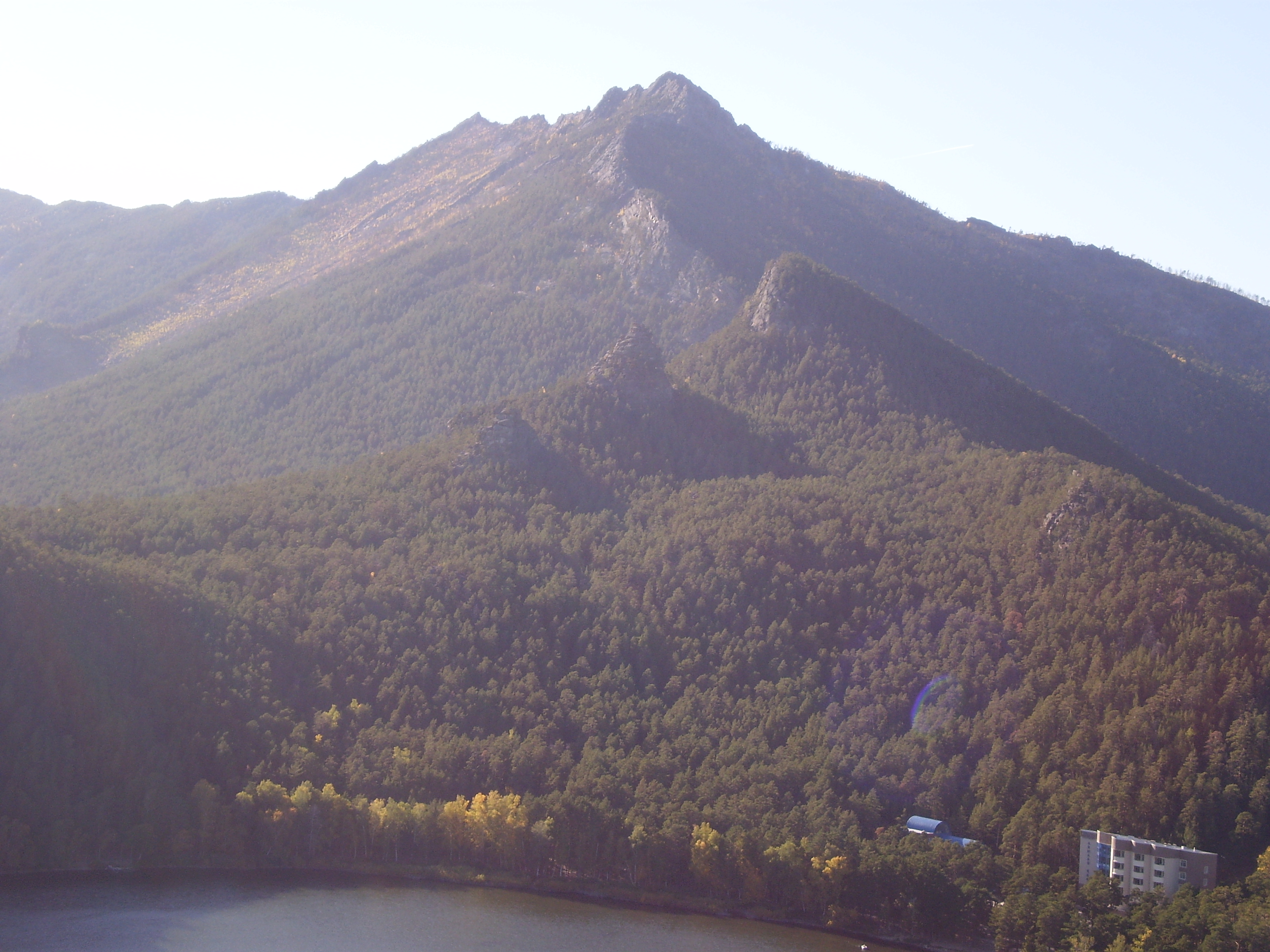

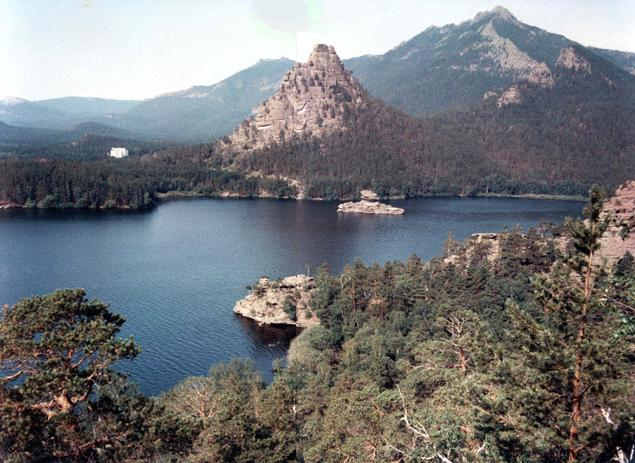

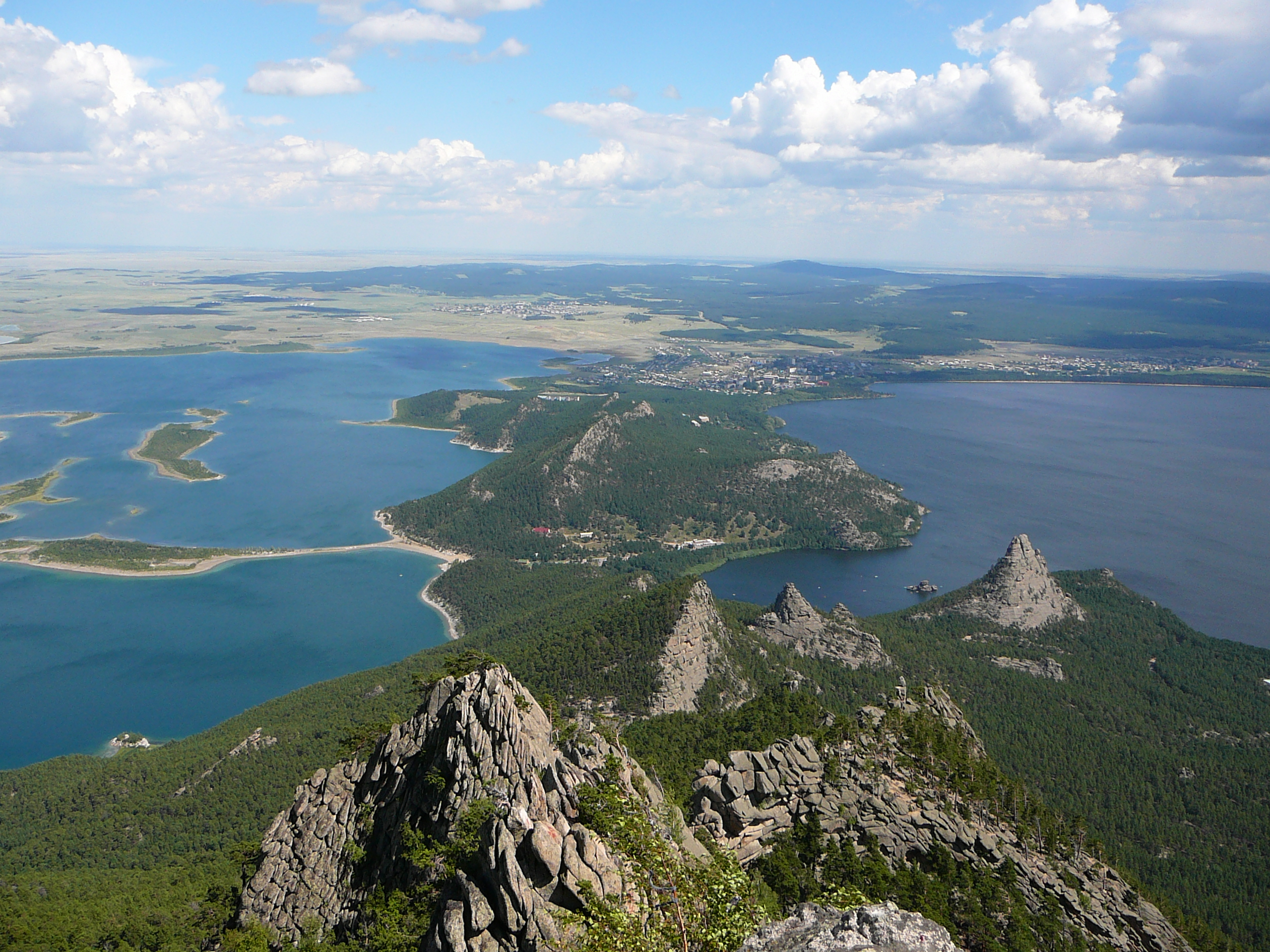

== References and links ==
=== Links ===
- List of national parks of Kazakhstan
- Official site of the Burabay National Park
