= Burabay District =

Coordinates: 52°56′N 70°12′E

- District
- Burabai audany
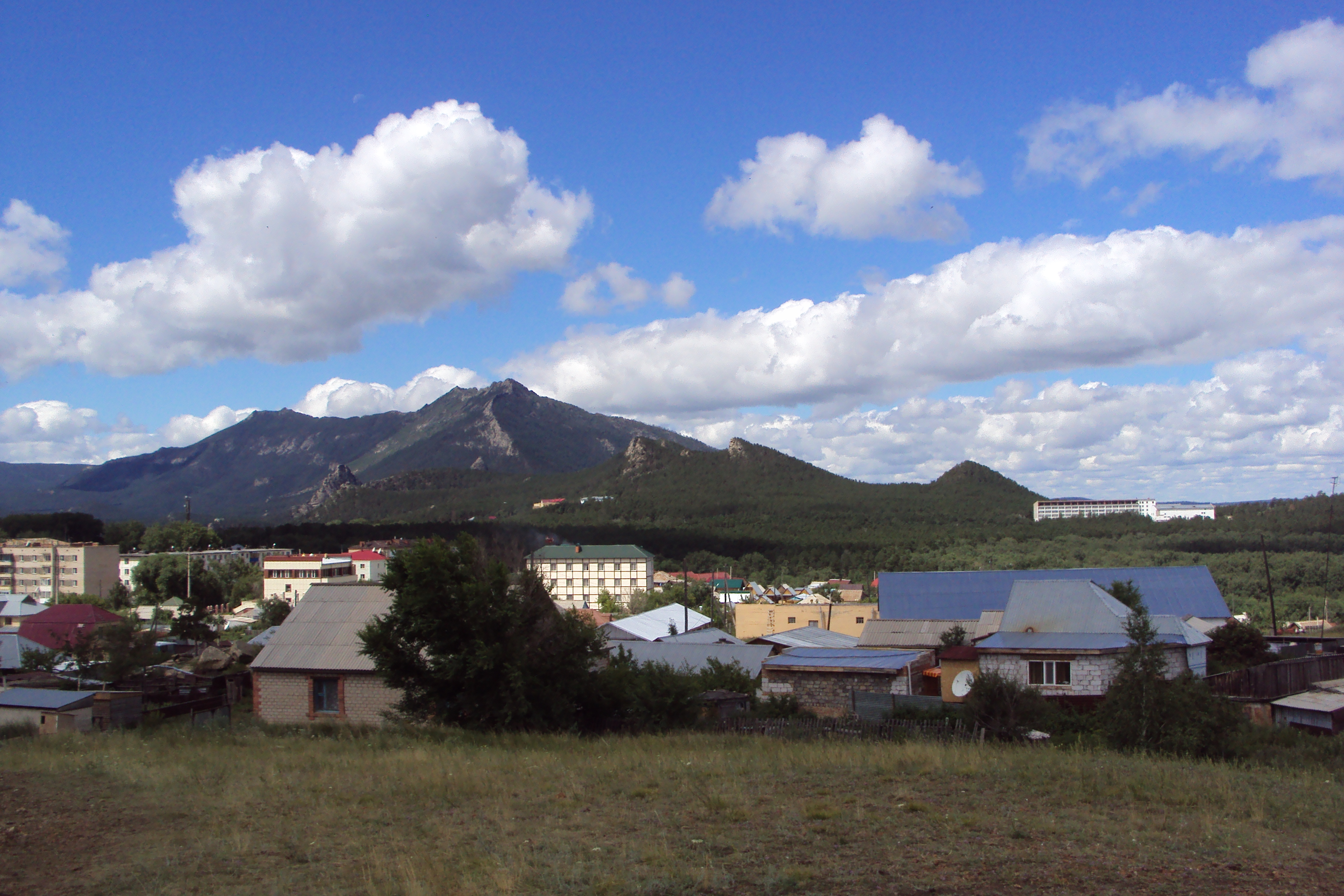
- View of Mount Kokshetau

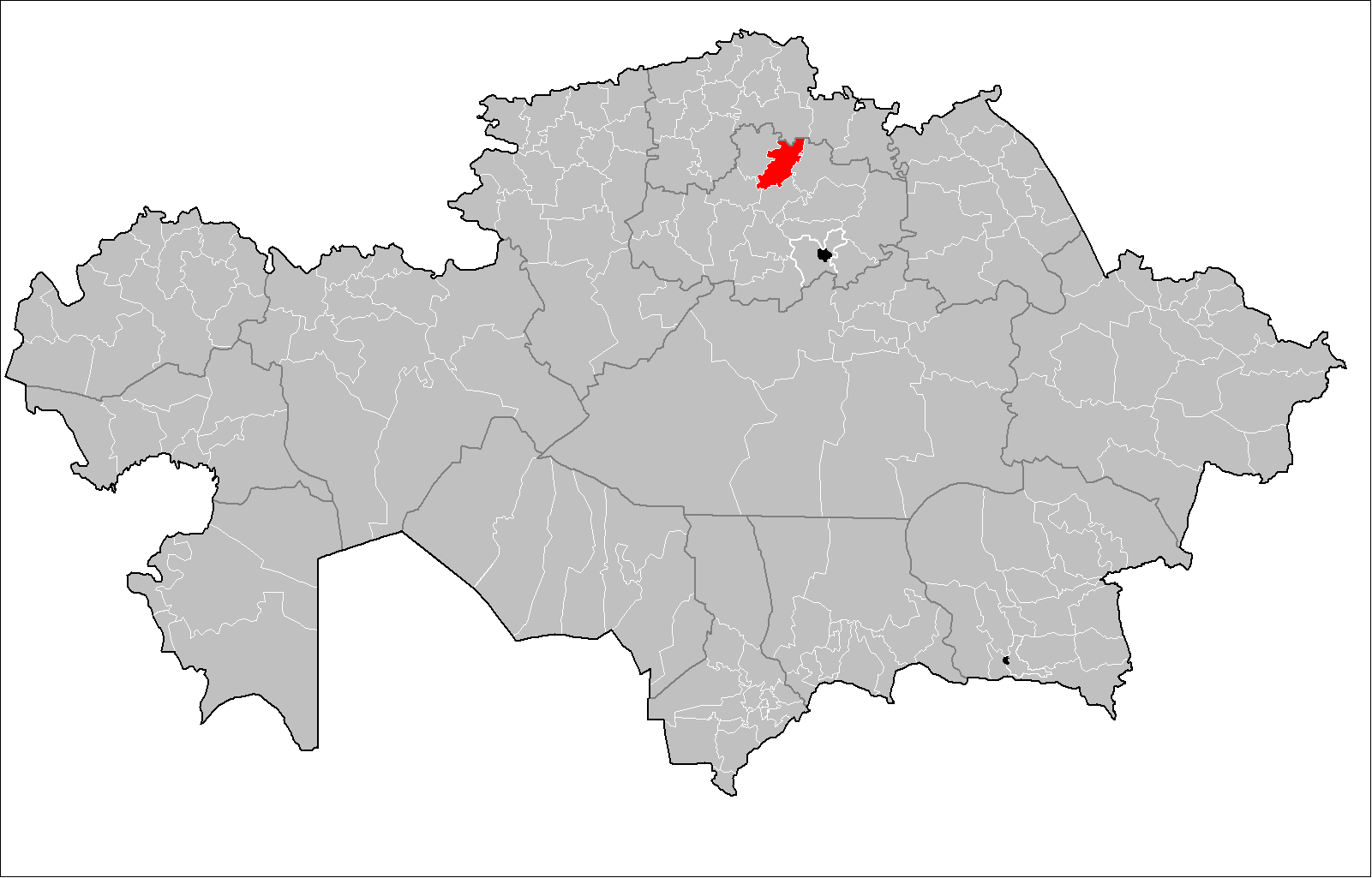
- Country: Kazakhstan
- Region: Aqmola Region
- Administrative center: Schuchinsk
- Founded: 1932

Government
  - Akim (mayor): Aray Sadykov

Area
  - Total: 2,300 sq mi (5,900 km^{2})

Population (2013)
  - Total: 74,794
- Time zone: UTC+6 (East)
- Website: Official website

Burabay District (Kazakh: Бурабай ауданы, Burabai audany; Russian: Бурабайский район) is a district of Aqmola Region in northern Kazakhstan. The administrative center of the district is the town of Shchuchinsk. Population: 81,739 (2009 census results); 73,169 (1999 census results).

Prior to September 3, 2009, Burabay District was known as Shchuchinsk District.

== Geography ==
The district lies in the Kokshetau Hills. The surrounding area is part of the Burabay National Park. Burabay spa town is located in the strip of land between lakes Burabay and Shchuchye.
