= Akmola Region =

Region in Kazakhstan

Akmola Region Ақмола облысы (Kazakh) Акмолинская область (Russian)
- Region
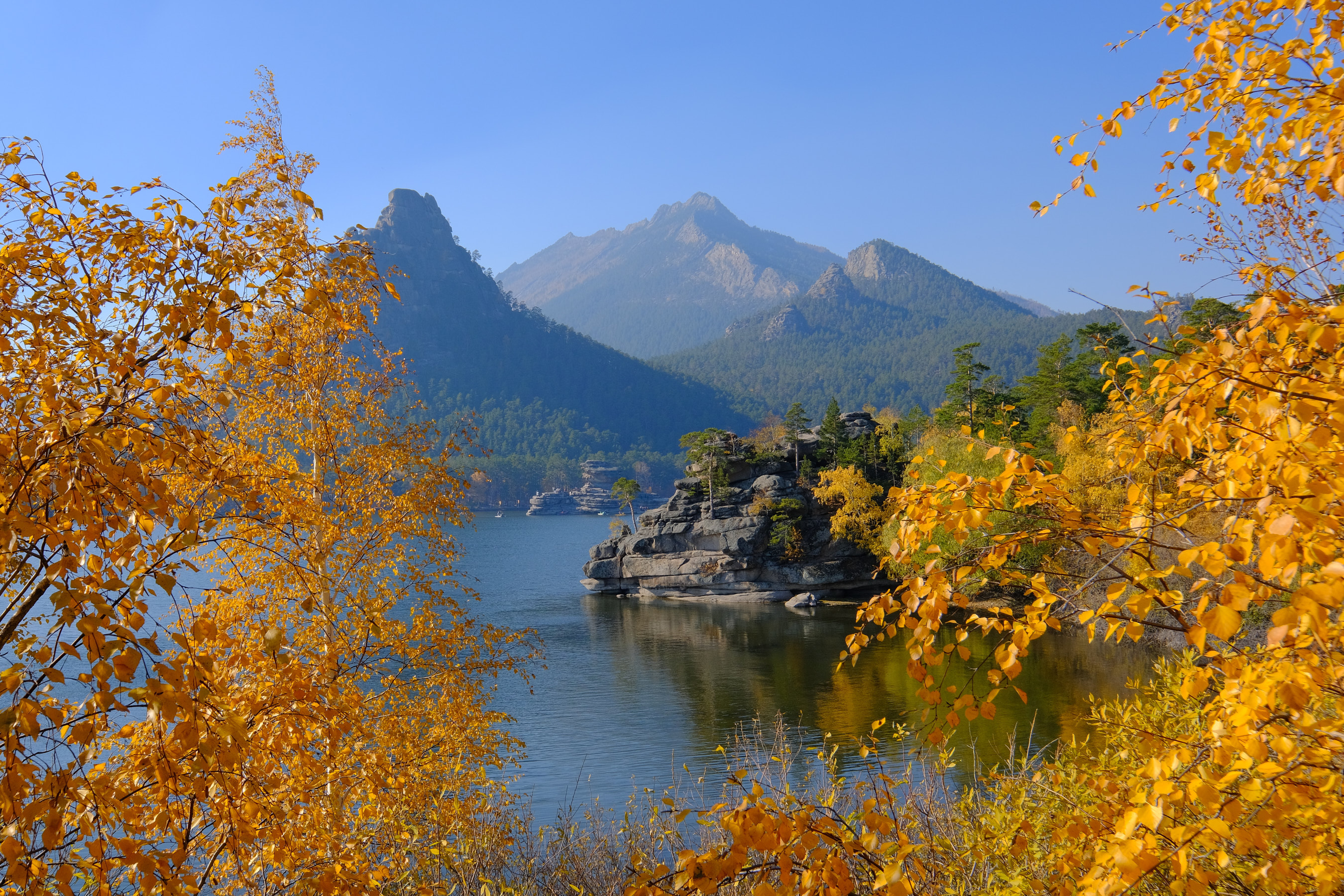
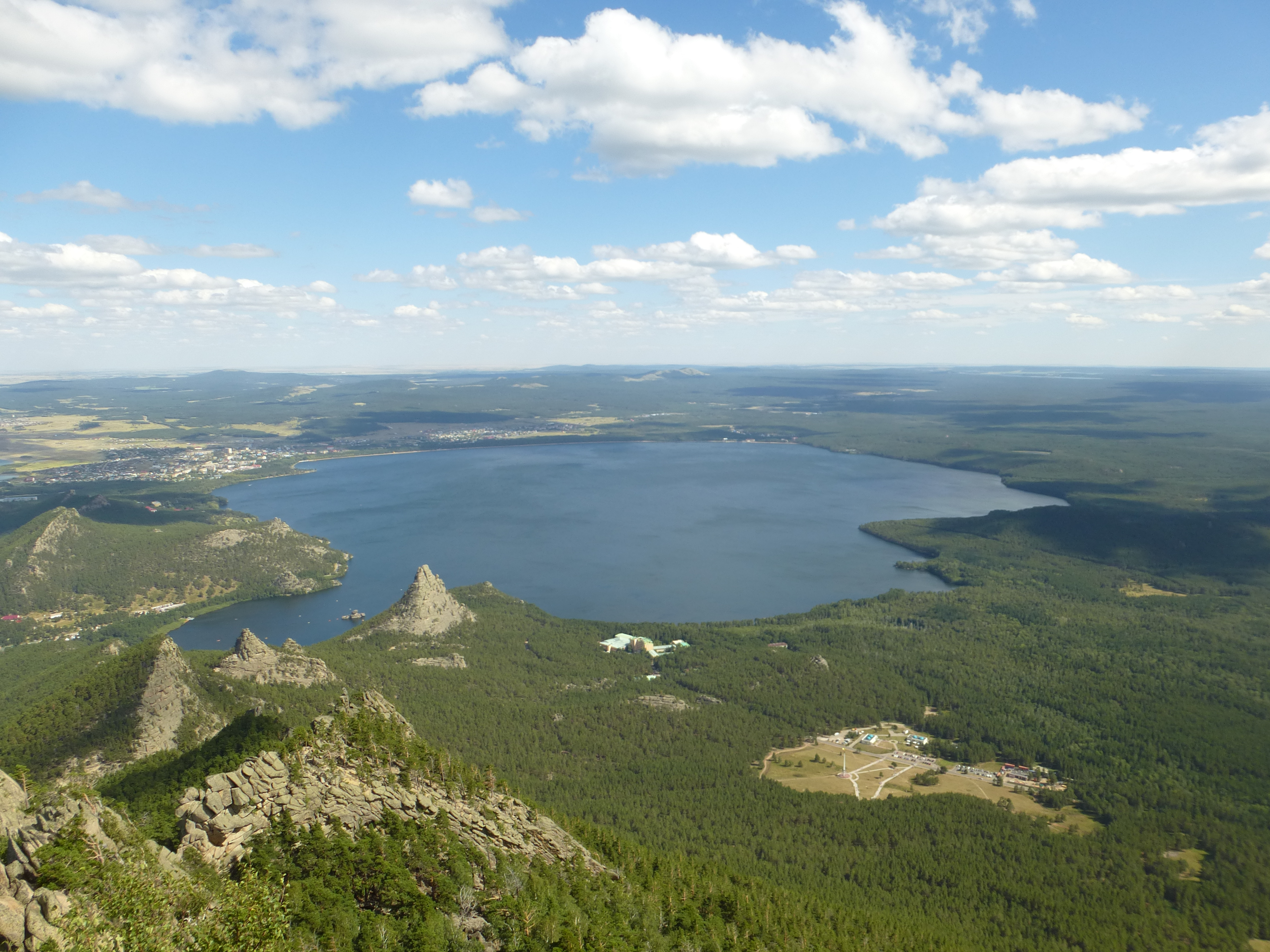
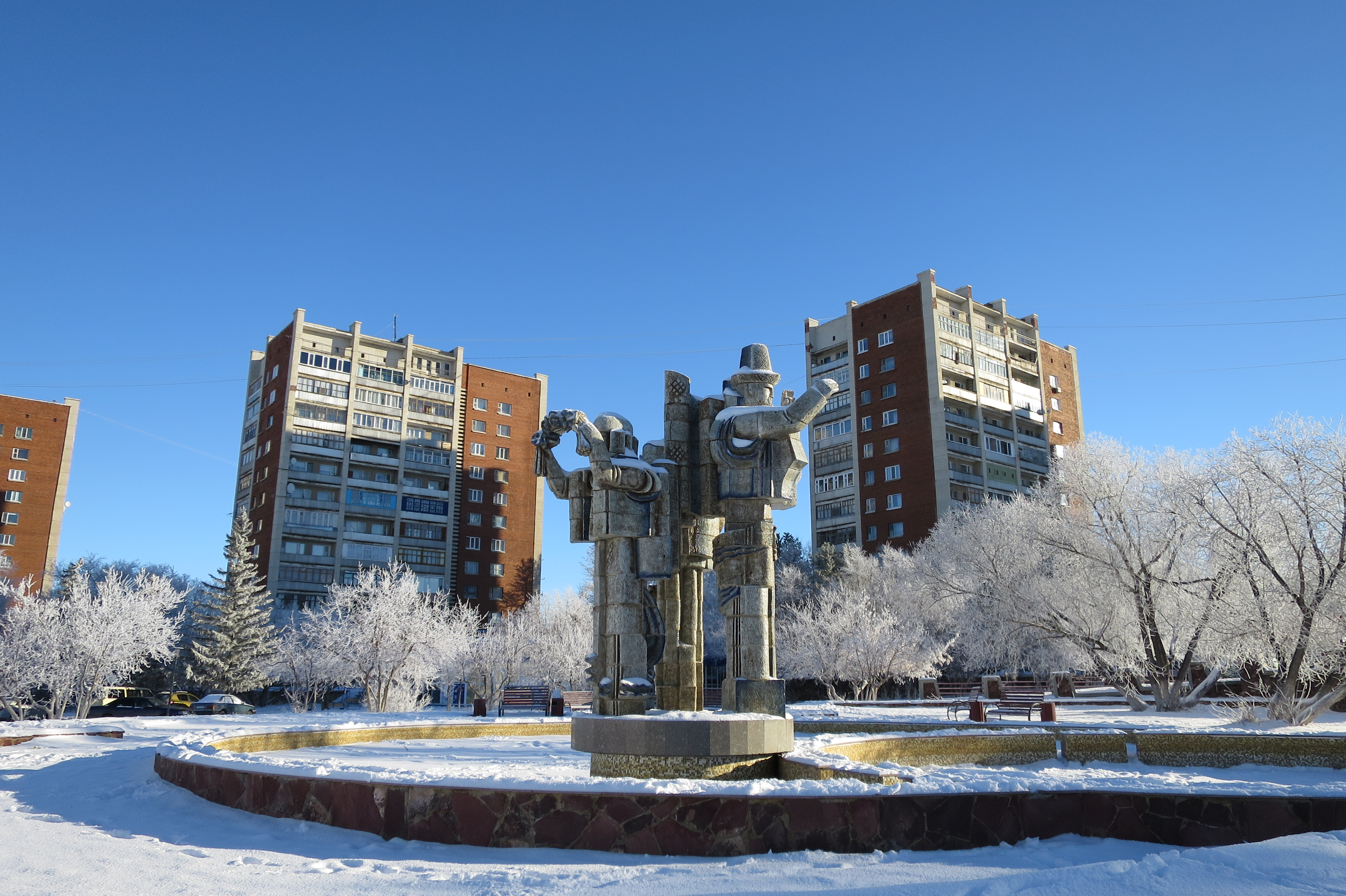
- From the top, Burabay National Park, Lake Burabay, Stepnogorsk

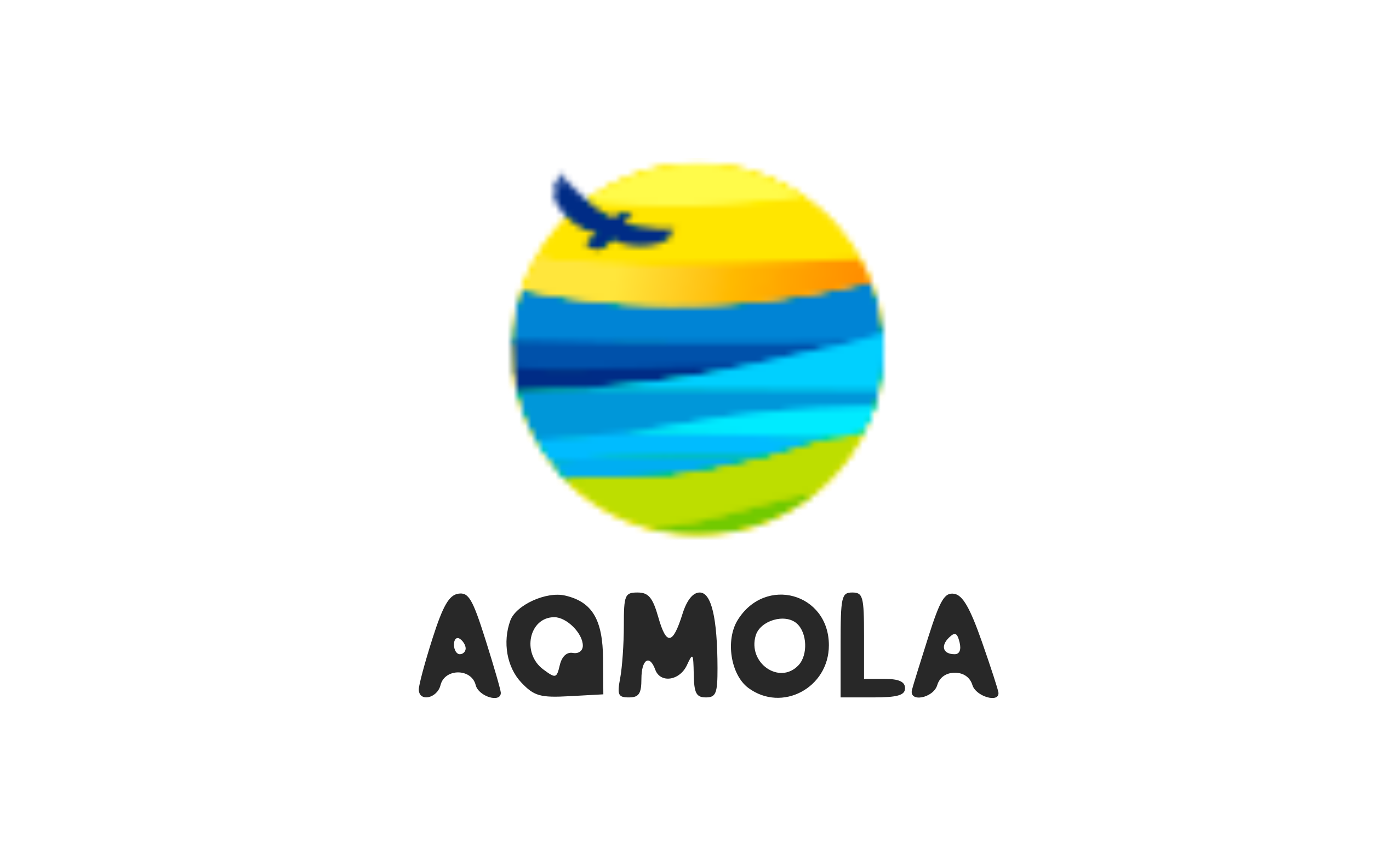
- Flag Coat of arms

- Map of Kazakhstan, location of Akmola Region highlighted
- Coordinates: 52°0′N 69°0′E
- Country: Kazakhstan
- Capital: Kökşetau

Government
  - Akim: Marat Ahmetjanov

Area
  - Total: 146,219 km^{2} (56,455 sq mi)

Population (2022-01-01)
  - Total: 785,708
  - Density: 5.37350/km^{2} (13.9173/sq mi)

GDP (Nominal, 2024)
  - Total: KZT 4,094 billion (US$ 8.597 billion) · 14th
  - Per capita: KZT 5,197,900 (US$ 10,916)
- Time zone: UTC+5
  - Summer (DST): UTC+5 (not observed)
- Postal codes: 020000
- Area codes: +7 (717)
- ISO 3166 code: KZ-AKM
- Vehicle registration: 03, C
- Districts: 17
- Cities: 8
- Townships: 14
- Villages: 671
- HDI (2023): 0.850 very high · 3rd
- Website: akmo.gov.kz

Akmola Region (Note: Kazakh: Ақмола облысы, romanized: Aqmola oblysy; Russian: Акмолинская область, romanized: Akmolinskaja oblastj) is a centrally located region of Kazakhstan. It was known as Tselinograd Oblast during Soviet rule. Its capital is Kökşetau. The national capital, Astana, is enclosed by the region, but is politically separate from Aqmola Region. The region's population is 715,000; Kökşetau's is 157,000.

Gold and coal mining occur in the area.

== Geography ==
The area of the region is 146,200 square kilometers. Aqmola, along with Ulytau Region and Karaganda Region, are Kazakhstan's only regions which don't touch the country's outer borders. The region borders North Kazakhstan Region in the north, Pavlodar Region in the east, Karagandy Region in the south, and Kostanay Region in the west. The Sileti river flows through the region.

== Etymology ==
Aqmola means "white tomb" in Kazakh.

== Demographics ==
=== Ethnic groups ===
Ethnic Group	2021	
Ethnic Group	Population	%
Kazakhs	436,984	55.81
Russians	210,769	26.92
Ukrainians	40,563	5.18
Germans	30,121	3.85
Tatars	13,707	1.75
Belarusians	13,054	1.67
Poles	8,610	1.10
Chechens	3,167	0.28
Azeris	2,156	0.28
Koreans	1,564	0.20
Uzbeks	1,457	0.19
Other Ethnicity or Not Stated	21,843	0.2
Total	782,995	100%

=== Religion ===
Religion	2021	
Religion	Population	%
Islam	362,070	46.24
Christianity	287,619	36.73
No religion	14,578	1.86
Judaism	295	0.04
Buddhism	152	0.02
Other Religion	1,034	0.13
Not Stated	117,247	14.97
Total	782,995	100%

== Administrative divisions ==
The region is administratively divided into seventeen districts and the cities of Kökşetau, Qosshy, and Stepnogorsk.

1. Kökşetau City Administration, with the administrative center in Kökşetau;
2. Akkol District, with the administrative center in the town of Akkol;
3. Arshaly District, the settlement of Arshaly;
4. Astrakhan District, selo of Astrakhanka;
5. Atbasar District, the town of Atbasar;
6. Birjan sal District, the town of Stepnyak;
7. Bulandy District, the town of Makinsk;
8. Burabay District, the town of Shchuchinsk;
9. Egindikol District, the selo of Egindikol;
10. Ereymentau District, the town of Ereymentau;
11. Esil District, the town of Esil;
12. Korgalzhyn District, the selo of Korgalzhyn;
13. Sandyktau District, the selo of Balkashino;
14. Shortandy District, the settlement of Shortandy;
15. Tselinograd District, the selo of Akmol;
16. Zerendi District, the selo of Zerendi;
17. Zhaksy District, the settlement of Zhaksy;
18. Zharkain District, the town of Derzhavinsk.

^{*} The following ten localities in Aqmola Region have town status: Akkol, Atbasar, Derzhavinsk, Ereymentau, Esil, Kökşetau, Qosshy, Makinsk, Shchuchinsk, Stepnogorsk, and Stepnyak.

== Notable people ==
- David Rigert, weightlifter, Olympic champion, 5x world champion (light-heavyweight and heavyweight), 68 world records.
