= Ulken Koskol =

Lake in Kazakhstan

- Үлкен Қоскөл
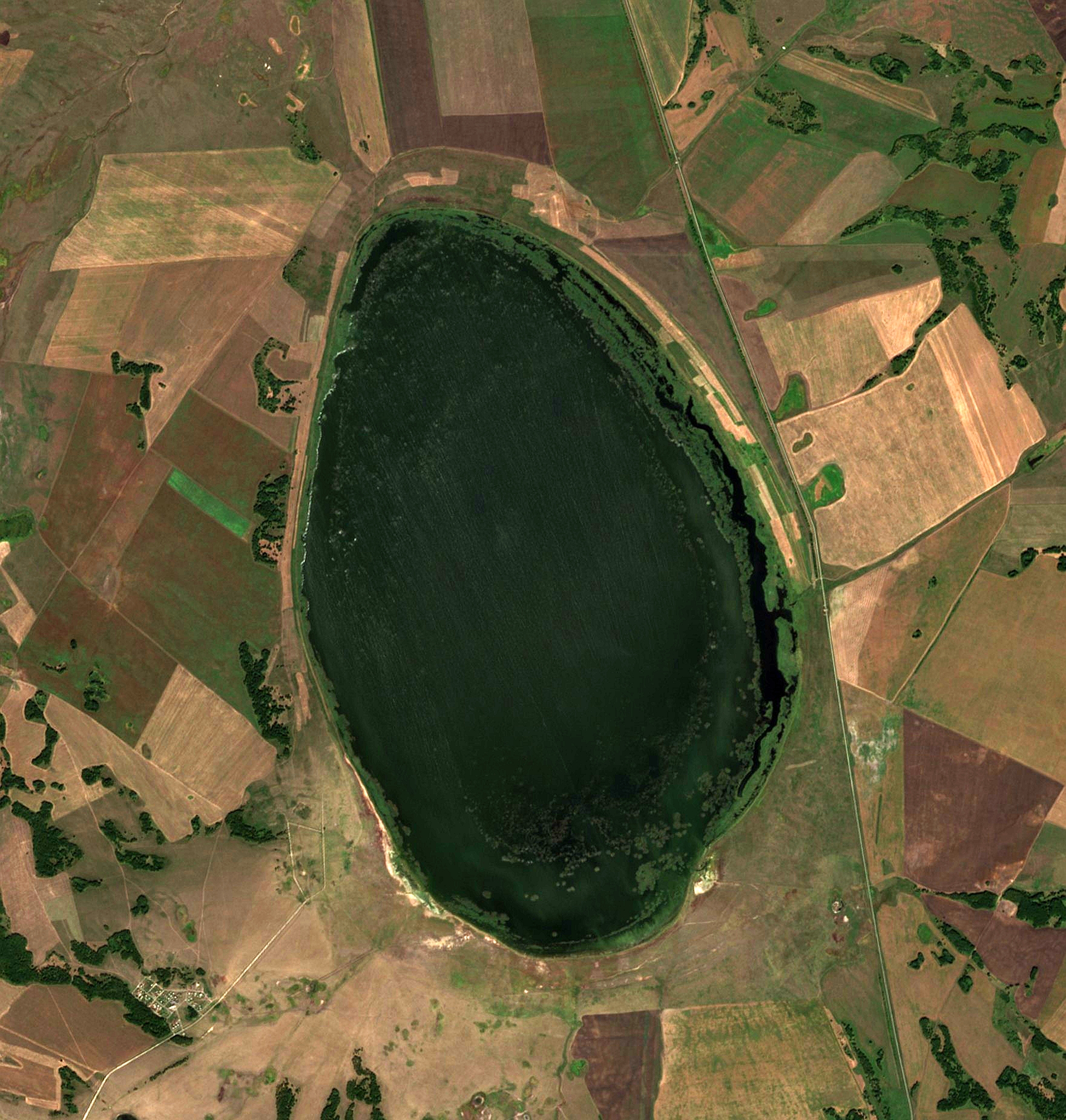
- Sentinel-2 image of the lake

- Location within Kazakhstan
- Location: Kazakh Uplands
- Coordinates: 53°22′40″N 64°50′24″E
- Type: endorheic
- Primary outflows: none
- Basin countries: Kazakhstan
- Max. length: 6.1 kilometers (3.8 mi)
- Max. width: 3.3 kilometers (2.1 mi)
- Surface area: 14.31 square kilometers (5.53 sq mi)
- Residence time: UTC+6
- Shore length^{1}: 15.2 kilometers (9.4 mi)
- Surface elevation: 257.1 meters (844 ft)
- ^{1} Shore length is not a well-defined measure.

Ulken Koskol (Kazakh: Үлкен Қоскөл; Russian: Большой Косколь) is a salt lake in Aiyrtau District, North Kazakhstan Region, Kazakhstan.

Saumalkol town, the district capital (formerly Volodarskoye), is located 12 kilometers (7.5 mi) to the southwest. Kenashchi village lies 1 kilometer (0.62 mi) to the southwest of the southwestern shore.

== Geography ==
Ulken Koskol is an endorheic lake in the Kazakh Uplands. It is part of the Ishim River basin. The bottom is flat and the lakeshore is clayey and gently sloping, Ulken Koskol is located in an area where there are numerous lakes. Kishi Koskol lies 4.5 kilometers (2.8 mi) to the SSE, Shalkar 15 kilometers (9.3 mi) to the south and lake Saumalkol 13 kilometers (8.1 mi) to the southwest. River Kamysakty has its sources a little to the NW of the northern end of Ulken Koskol.

The lake is fed mainly by snow and precipitation. Since the water is salty and has high mineral content it is not suitable for drinking. Ulken Koskol is largely surrounded by agricultural fields.

== Flora ==
Sedges and fescue grow in the fields nearby that are not plowed.

== See also ==
- List of lakes of Kazakhstan
