= Kalmakkol =

Lake in Kazakhstan

- Қалмақкөл
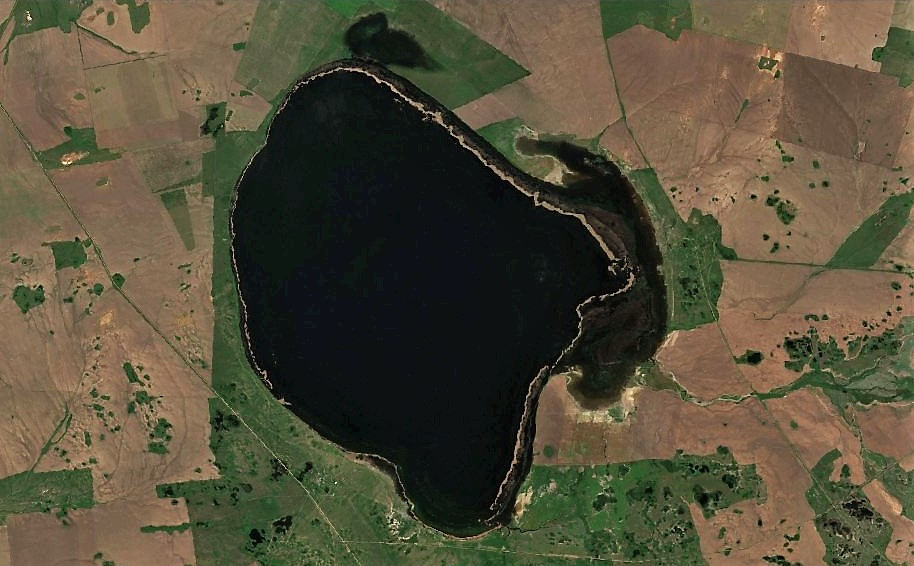
- Sentinel-2 image of the lake

- Location within Kazakhstan
- Location: Ishim Plain; West Siberian Plain
- Coordinates: 52°27′00″N 67°32′31″E
- Basin countries: Kazakhstan
- Max. length: 10.7 kilometers (6.6 mi)
- Max. width: 8.2 kilometers (5.1 mi)
- Surface area: 53.1 square kilometers (20.5 sq mi)
- Residence time: UTC+6
- Shore length^{1}: 32.5 kilometers (20.2 mi)
- Surface elevation: 308.3 meters (1,011 ft)
- ^{1} Shore length is not a well-defined measure.

Kalmakkol (Kazakh: Қалмақкөл), is a salt lake in Gabit Musirepov District, North Kazakhstan Region, and Zhaksy District, Akmola Region, Kazakhstan.

Novoishim town, the administrative center of the district, is located approximately 90 kilometers (56 mi) to the NNW of the lake. The border with Akmola Region runs close to the southwestern shore of the lake and a small sector lies within Zhaksy District.

== Geography ==
Kalmakkol occupies a tectonic depression at the southern end of the West Siberian Plain. It lies about 50 kilometers (31 mi) to the east of the left bank of the Ishim. The Akkanburlyk, a tributary of the Ishim, flows 50 kilometers (31 mi) to the north of the northern end. The lake has a roughly triangular shape.

Ulykol lake is located 62 kilometers (39 mi) to the northwest in the same district. Lake Zhaksy-Zhalgyztau lies 35 kilometers (22 mi) to the northeast.

== Flora ==
The vegetation in the area of the lake is steppe.

== See also ==
- List of lakes of Kazakhstan
