= Imantau (lake) =

Lake in Kazakhstan

- Имантау
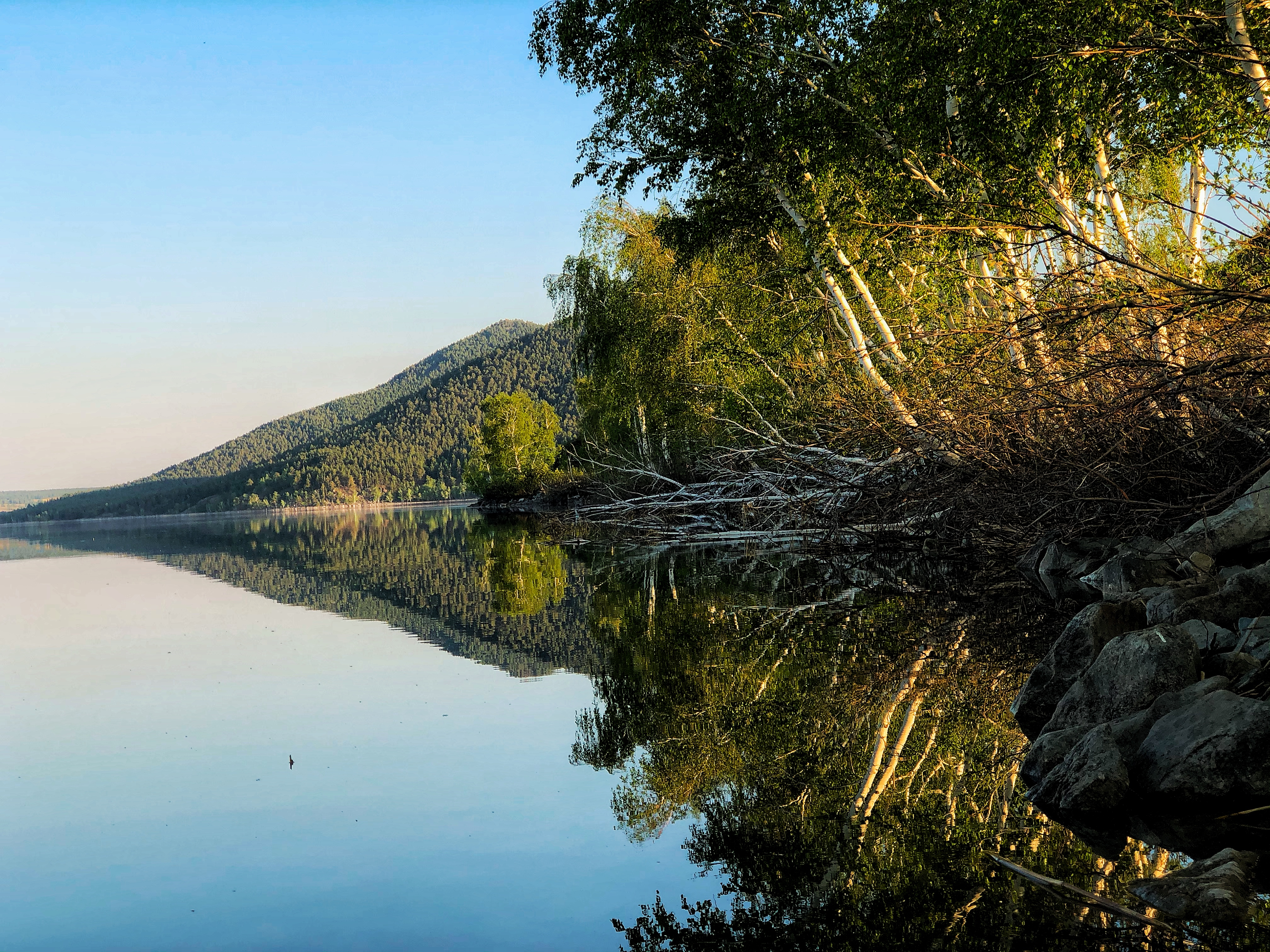
- Panorama of the lakeshore

- Location within Kazakhstan
- Location: Kokshetau Hills; Kazakh Uplands
- Coordinates: 53°01′00″N 68°16′40″E
- Primary outflows: Imanburlyk
- Catchment area: 483 square kilometers (186 sq mi)
- Basin countries: Kazakhstan
- Max. length: 13.1 kilometers (8.1 mi)
- Max. width: 4.8 kilometers (3.0 mi)
- Surface area: 49 square kilometers (19 sq mi)
- Average depth: 5.7 meters (19 ft)
- Max. depth: ca 10 meters (33 ft)
- Residence time: UTC+5
- Surface elevation: 323 meters (1,060 ft)
- Frozen: October to May
- Islands: Kazachy Island
- Settlements: Imantau

Imantau (Kazakh: Имантау), is a lake in Aiyrtau District, North Kazakhstan Region, Kazakhstan.

Saumalkol town, the administrative center of the district, is located approximately 25 kilometers (16 mi) to the north of the lake. Imantau village lies by the southeastern lakeshore and Arykbalyk village 10 kilometers (6.2 mi) to the southwest.

== Geography ==
Imantau lies in the western sector of the Kokshetau Lakes. It is part of the Ishim basin. The lake is elongated, stretching in a roughly northwest–southeast direction for over 13 kilometers (8.1 mi). A headland in the west divides the western shore into two sectors and river Imanburlyk flows out of the lake from the northern one. There is a 16 hectares (40 acres) islet, Kazachy Island, in the middle of the southern part. The lakeshore is gently sloping, except for the southwestern section, where it is steep. The bottom has a maximum depth of 10 meters (33 ft) and is stony in the southeast, clayey-sandy in the north and muddy in the remaining parts. The lake is fed by snow and rainwater. The water of the lake is slightly alkaline, with a mineralization ranging between 780 milligrams per liter (0.00045 oz/cu in) and 840 milligrams per liter (0.00049 oz/cu in).

Lake Shalkar is located 15 kilometers (9.3 mi) to the northeast in the same district, Kumdykol 33 kilometers (21 mi) to the southeast, Zhaksy-Zhalgyztau 36 kilometers (22 mi) to the south and lake Ulykol 88 kilometers (55 mi) to the west. Imantau mountain rises a little to the southwest of the southern end of the lake.

== Flora and fauna ==
Reeds and bulrushes grow by stretches of the lakeshore. The lake is surrounded by patches of aspen and birch forests. Among the fishes living in the lake chebak, ide, perch, pike, mirror carp and crucian carp deserve mention.

== See also ==
- List of lakes of Kazakhstan
