= List of bridges in Kazakhstan =

This is a list of bridges in Kazakhstan

== Major road and railway bridges ==
This table presents the structures with spans greater than 100 meters (non-exhaustive list).

	Name	Kazakh	Span	Length	Type	Carries Crosses	Opened	Location	Province	Ref.
1	Semey Bridge	Семей қаласындағы аспалы көпір	750 m (2,460 ft)	1,086 m (3,563 ft)	Suspension; Steel box girder deck, steel pylons	M 38; Irtysh River	2002	Semey; 50°24′36.5″N 80°13′29.4″E	East Kazakhstan	
2	Nurly Zhol Bridge	Нұрлы жол көпір	252 m (827 ft)		Arch; Steel tied-arch 110+252+110	Road bridge Irtysh River	2016	Pavlodar; 52°09′53.4″N 76°55′48.7″E	Pavlodar	
3	Ishim River Metro Bridge		155 m (509 ft)		Arch; Steel tied-arch	Nur-Sultan Light Metro; Ishim River		Nur-Sultan; 51°07′15.2″N 71°26′45.3″E	Nur-Sultan	
4	M3 Bridge (1)		151 m (495 ft)		Arch; Steel tied-arch	Road bridge Sarayshyq Street; Ishim River	2009	Nur-Sultan; 51°07′52.2″N 71°26′50.6″E	Nur-Sultan	
5	M3 Bridge (2)		151 m (495 ft)		Arch; Steel tied-arch	Road bridge Syghanaq Street; Ishim River	2009	Nur-Sultan; 51°07′13.8″N 71°26′44.9″E	Nur-Sultan	
6	Ramstor Bridge		120 m (390 ft)	180 m (590 ft)	Arch; Steel through arch	Qabanbay Batyr Avenue P 3 Ishim River	2009	Nur-Sultan; 51°09′06.3″N 71°25′41.5″E	Nur-Sultan	
7	Ural River Bridge (Makhambet)		120 m (390 ft)	860 m (2,820 ft)	Box girder Prestressed concrete	Road bridge Ural River	2018	Makhambet; 47°38′11.6″N 51°35′48.1″E	Atyrau	
8	Ural River Bridge		105 m (344 ft) (x3)	483 m (1,585 ft)	Beam; Composite steel/concrete deck 84+105x3+84	Road bridge Ural River	1998	Oral; 51°07′31.6″N 51°21′52.1″E	West Kazakhstan	

== Notes and References ==
- Notes
- Nicolas Janberg. "International Database for Civil and Structural Engineering". Structurae.com.
- Others references

== See also ==
- Transport in Kazakhstan
- Rail transport in Kazakhstan
- Roads in Kazakhstan
- Geography of Kazakhstan
