= Priozyornoye, Akmola Region =

Priozyornoye Приозёрное
- Village
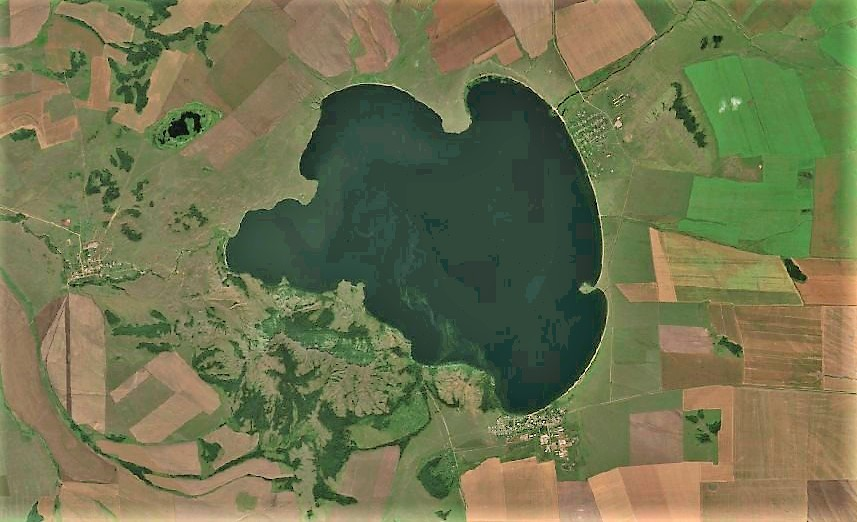
- Sentinel 2 image of Zhaksy-Zhalgyztau lake with Priozyornoye village in the lower right.

- Location in Kazakhstan
- Coordinates: 52°34′46″N 68°12′06″E
- Country: Kazakhstan
- Region: Akmola Region
- District: Sandyktau District
- Rural District: Zhambyl Rural District

Population (2009)
  - Total: 675
- Time zone: UTC+5
- Post code: 021422

Priozyornoye (Kazakh: Приозёрное; Russian: Приозёрное) is a settlement in Sandyktau District, Akmola Region, Kazakhstan. It is the head of the Zhambyl rural district (KATO code - 116443100). Population: 675 (2009 census results); 856 (1999 census results).

== Geography ==
Priozyornoye is located by the shore of lake Zhaksy-Zhalgyztau, 36 kilometers (22 mi) to the west of Balkashino, the administrative center of the district. Zhaksy-Zhalgyztau village lies 7 kilometers (4.3 mi) away, by the northeastern lakeshore.
