= Shalkar (disambiguation) =

Shalkar is a town in the Aktobe Region of Kazakhstan.

Shalkar may also refer to:

- Shalkar District, a district in Kazakhstan
- Shalkar (village), Karaganda Region, Kazakhstan
- Shalkar (North Kazakhstan Region), a village in the North Kazakhstan Region
- Shalkar Radio, a unit of Radio Kazakhstan

== Water bodies ==
- Shalkar (Terekti District), a lake of the Ural basin, Terekti District, Western Kazakhstan
- Shalkar (Kokshetau), a lake in the Kazakh Uplands, Kazakhstan
- Shalkar (lake, Aktobe Region), lake in the Shalkar District, Aktobe Region
- Shalkar, one of the lakes of the Sholakshalkar group
- Shalkarteniz (formerly "Chalkar-Teniz"), a lake in the Yrgyz District, Aktobe Region, Kazakhstan
- Shalkarkol, a lake in Pavlodar Region, Kazakhstan
- Shalkar-Yega-Kara, a lake in Orenburg Oblast, Russia
