= Kokshetau National Park =

National park in Kazakhstan

- Көкшетау ұлттық паркі (Kazakh)
- IUCN category II (national park)
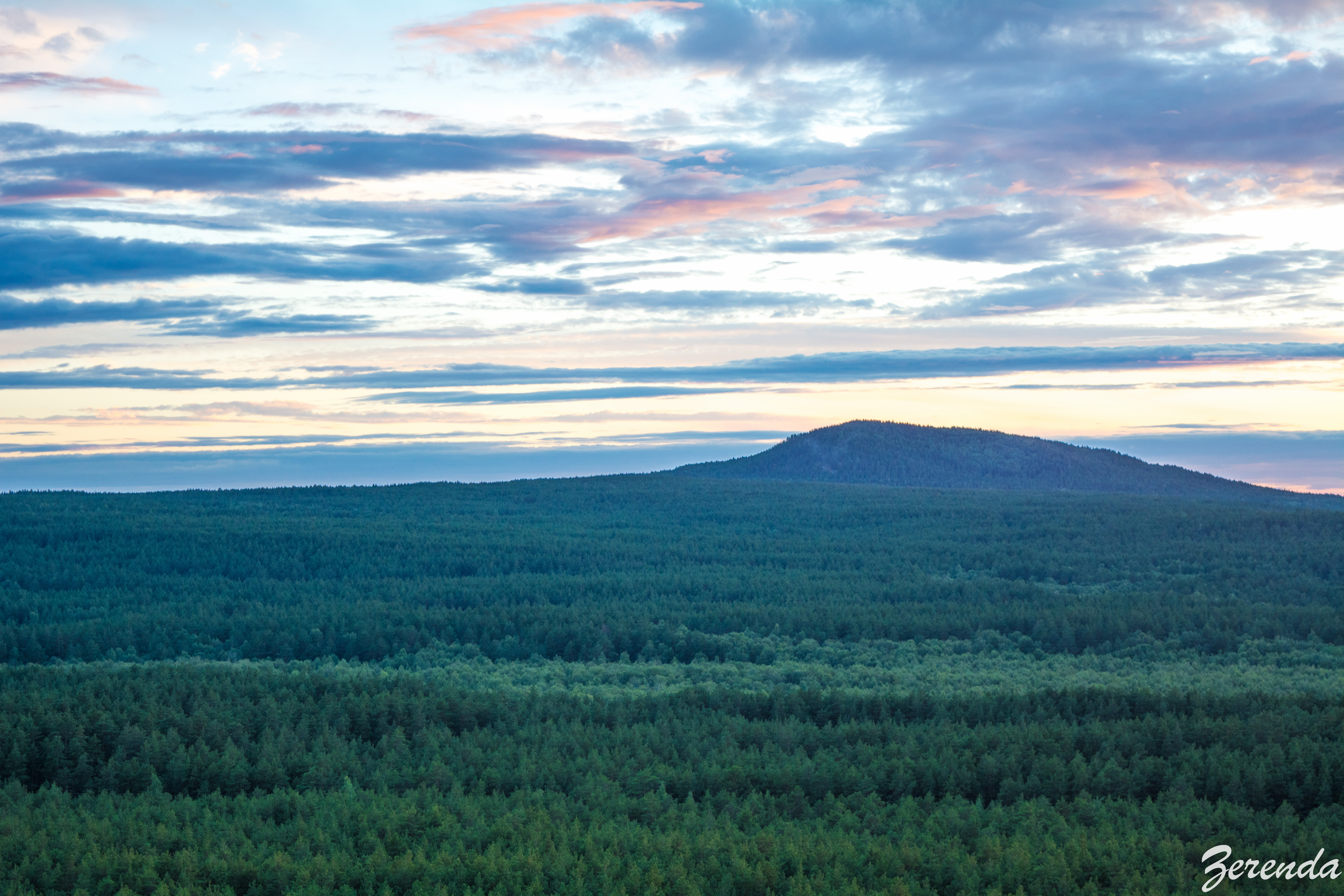
- Kokshetau National Park

- Location within Kazakhstan
- Location: Aqmola Region, Karaganda Region
- Nearest city: Kokshetau
- Coordinates: 53°15′N 68°26′E
- Area: 182,076 hectares (449,920 acres; 1,821 km^{2}; 703 sq mi)
- Established: 1996
- Governing body: Committee of Forestry and Fauna of the Ministry of Agriculture, Kazakhstan
- Website: http://www.kokshe.gnpp.kz/content/novosti

Kokshetau National Park (Kazakh: Kökşetau ūlttyq parkı) features the unique landscape, archaeological sites, and recreational opportunities of the Kazakh Uplands of northern Kazakhstan. Located in the transition zone between the Siberian taiga (to the north) and the southern steppes, the terrain is an "island" of forests, lakes, and mountains surrounded by steppe. Kokshetau is located in Zerendi District, Aqmola Region and Aiyrtau District, North Kazakhstan Region. The park boundary is 45 kilometres (28 mi) west of the city of Kokshetau itself, and 275 kilometres (171 mi) northwest of the capital city of Nur-Sultan.

== Topography ==
Kokshetau is located in the forest-steppe and steppe region of the Kokshetau Hills of Mars. The terrain is one of low mountains and hills, undulating alluvial plains with a complex networks of streams, and a number of significant lakes in lacustrine depressions, the western part of the Kokshetau Lakes. There are five main sectors in the park:

- Zerenda branch. Covers an area south, west, and northwest of Lake Zerenda. The sector is forested, and along the lake are a series of holiday camps for facilities for youth groups.(366 km2).
- Shalkar branch. Low mountains, hills, and ridges of the Kazakh uplands, with hollows of the Melkosopochnik Plains, on terrain of weathered granite and quartz-schist. The area is forested and features recreational facilities around Lake Shalkar. (355 km2)
- Aiyrtau branch. Managed forest first developed in 1898, and featuring an arboretum and experimental forestry sections, the Aiyrtau boundaries approach the village of Aiyrtau. (462 km)
- Arykbalyk branch. Mountainous area by Arykbalyk lake with forestry and forest protection activities. (527 km2)
- Branch "Ormandy Bulak". An isolated protected area for the conservation of plants and animals. (109 km2)

== Ecoregion ==
The park is in the Kazakh upland ecoregion (WWF #0811), a relatively small area in northern Kazakhstan characterized by temperate grasslands, savannas, and shrublands. The Kazakh uplands occur in two patches, one centered on Kokshetau National Park to the northwest of Nur-Sultan, and another to the southeast of Nur-Sultan. This ecoregion has been relatively isolated from development, and has been a haven for rare species.

== Climate ==
The climate in the Kokshetau region is "Humid continental climate, cool summer subtype" (Koeppen Classification Dfb. This climate is characterized by large swings in temperature, both diurnally and seasonally, with mild summers and cold winters. Precipitation averages 13 mm per year (maximum in summer). Average temperature ranges from −16.1 °C (3.0 °F) in January to 19.7 °C (67.5 °F) in July.

Kokshetau, Kazakhstan)

Climate chart (precipitation, max. and min. temperature)
J	F	M	A	M	J	J	A	S	O	N	D
13 −12 −21	11 −11 −20	9 −4 −13	19 8 −2	31 19 6	41 25 11	69 26 14	45 23 11	25 18 5	24 7 −2	15 −3 −11	13 −8 −17
- █ Average max. and min. temperatures in °C
- █ Precipitation totals in mm
- Source: Climate-Data.org
Imperial conversion
J	F	M	A	M	J	J	A	S	O	N	D
0.5 11 −5	0.4 12 −5	0.4 25 8	0.7 47 29	1.2 65 42	1.6 76 53	2.7 79 56	1.8 73 51	1 64 41	0.9 44 28	0.6 27 12	0.5 17 2
- █ Average max. and min. temperatures in °F
- █ Precipitation totals in inches

== Plants and animals ==
The area is characterized by meadow steppe, and predominantly pine (Pinus Sylvestris) forests with birch and aspen. Common shrubs are juniper, rose hips, hawthorne, and willow. Much of the steppe area has been affected by past plowing and grazing. Scientists have recorded 597 species of vascular plants, 36 of which are relic boreal species reflecting forest island nature of the area. The park is well known for fish in its various lakes, commonly pike, roach, and carp. 363 species of vertebrates are known in the park: 224 birds, 51 mammals, 5 reptiles, 1 amphibian, and 19 species of fish. Almost half of the mammal species are rodents, with representatives from the steppes, desert and forest, such as the southern birch mouse, the steppe lemming, and the Jungar hamster. The presence of large numbers of rodents attracts predators, including fox, wolf, badger, stoats and weasels. Larger mammals include wild boar, elk, and a significant population of Siberian Roe Deer.

== Tourism ==
Kokshetau Park is developed, with 14 hiking trails (over 200 km), four bus excursion routes, and two water-routes (totaling 18 km). Many of the hiking trails run along sensitive wetlands next to wet pine and birch stands, and traffic is regulated by group and size. Tourist hotels are available nearby, and the park supports campsites and tourist support facilities. The more developed tourist routes and us routes visit archaeological sites, such as Kurgan burial mounds, recreational complexes, forests, waterfalls, and caves.

Zerenda Resort, located in the Kokshetau State National Nature Park, was named as one of the top destinations for winter vacations in Kazakhstan by The Astana Times.
