= Zhaksy-Zhalgyztau (lake) =

Lake in Kazakhstan

- Жақсы Жалғызтау
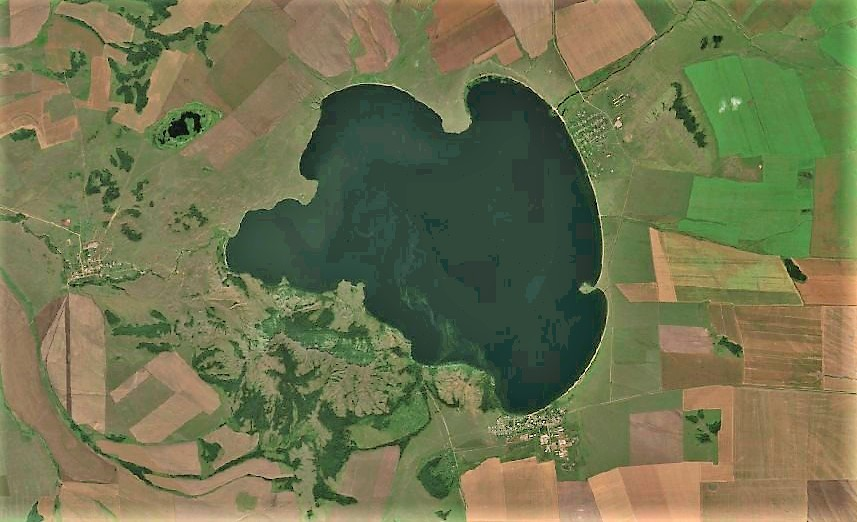
- Sentinel-2 picture of the lake.

- Location within Kazakhstan
- Location: Kokshetau Hills; Kazakh Uplands
- Coordinates: 52°37′00″N 68°10′30″E
- Type: exorheic
- Primary inflows: Karasu
- Primary outflows: Akkanburlyk
- Catchment area: 483 square kilometers (186 sq mi)
- Basin countries: Kazakhstan
- Max. length: 8.8 kilometers (5.5 mi)
- Max. width: 8 kilometers (5.0 mi)
- Surface area: 43.2 square kilometers (16.7 sq mi)
- Average depth: Zhaksy-Zhalgyztau
- Max. depth: 14.5 meters (48 ft)
- Water volume: 0.368 cubic kilometers (0.088 cu mi)
- Residence time: UTC+5
- Surface elevation: 358 meters (1,175 ft)
- Frozen: November to April
- Islands: none
- Settlements: Zhaksy-Zhalgyztau and Priozyornoye

Zhaksy-Zhalgyztau (Kazakh: Жақсы Жалғызтау; Russian: Жаксы-Жалгызтау), is a lake in Aiyrtau District, North Kazakhstan Region, and Sandyktau District, Akmola Region, Kazakhstan.

Zhaksy-Zhalgyztau village is located by the northeastern and Priozyornoye by the southern lakeshore. Most of the lake is North Kazakhstan Region, but the southern tip is in Akmola Region. The lake water is used for irrigating nearby agricultural fields.

== Geography ==
Zhaksy-Zhalgyztau lies in the western sector of the Kokshetau Lakes, at the western edge of the Kokshetau Hills. It is part of the Ishim basin. The shape of the lake is irregular, with two wide bays in the north separated by a broad landspit. The Akkanburlyk river flows out of the western end of the lake. The water is fresh and the bottom is sandy and pebbly. Zhaksy-Zhalgyztau is fed by rain and groundwater.

Lake Imantau lies 36 kilometers (22 mi) to the north, Kumdykol 35 kilometers (22 mi) to the northeast and lake Kalmakkol 38 kilometers (24 mi) to the WSW. 729 meters (2,392 ft) high Zhaksy-Zhalgyztau mountain rises above the southwestern lakeshore.

== Flora and fauna ==
Reeds grow only by the northwestern shore. Zhaksy-Zhalgyztau is surrounded by forest-steppe vegetation. Among the fishes living in the lake perch, common roach, bream, pike, zander, Eurasian carp, ide and catfish deserve mention.

== See also ==
- List of lakes of Kazakhstan
