= Zhaksy-Zhalgyztau (village) =

Zhaksy-Zhalgyztau Жақсы Жалғызтау
- Village
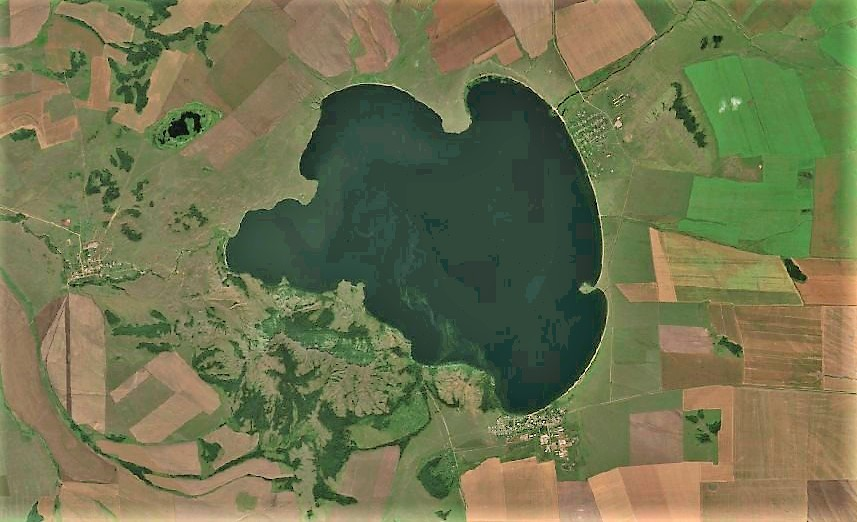
- Sentinel 2 image of the lake with Zhaksy-Zhalgyztau village in the upper right.

- Location in Kazakhstan
- Coordinates: 52°38′23″N 68°13′18″E
- Country: Kazakhstan
- Region: North Kazakhstan Region
- District: Aiyrtau District
- Rural District: Lower Burlyk Rural District

Population (2009)
  - Total: 397
- Time zone: UTC+5

Zhaksy-Zhalgyztau (Kazakh: Жақсы Жалғызтау; Russian: Жаксы Жалгызтау) is a settlement in Aiyrtau District, North Kazakhstan Region of Kazakhstan. It is the head of the Lower Burlyk rural district (KATO code - 593247500). Population: 397 (2009 census results); 484 (1999 census results).

== Geography ==
Zhaksy-Zhalgyztau village is located approximately 80 kilometers (50 mi) to the south of Saumalkol town, the administrative center of the district, by the shore of the lake of the same name. Priozyornoye village lies at the southern end of the lake.
