= Imantau (village) =

Imantau Имантау
- Village
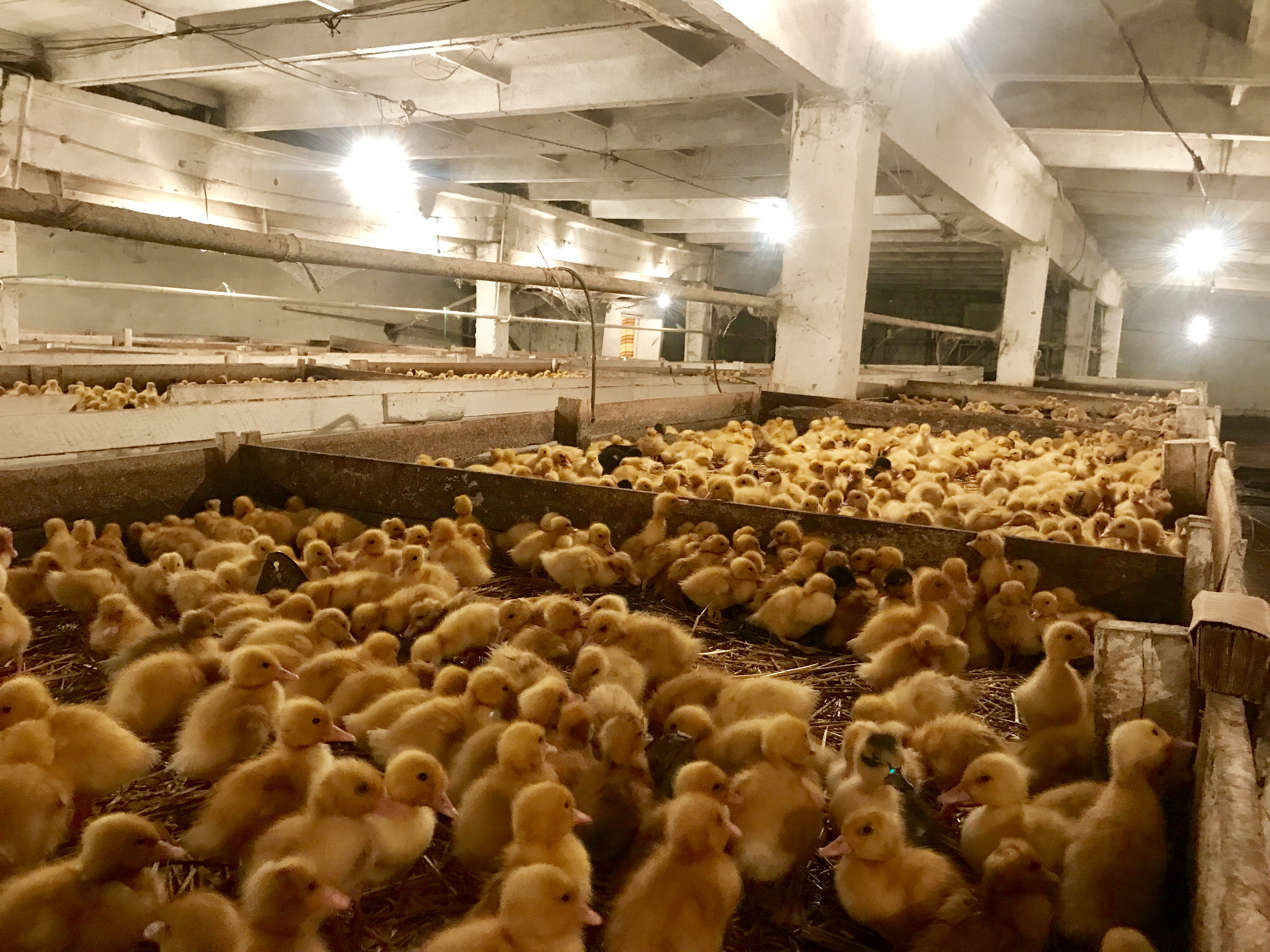
- Duck farm in Imantau

- Location in Kazakhstan
- Coordinates: 52°55′34″N 68°21′54″E
- Country: Kazakhstan
- Region: North Kazakhstan Region
- District: Aiyrtau District
- Rural District: Imantau Rural District
- Settled: 1850

Population (2009)
  - Total: 2,459
- Time zone: UTC+5
- Post code: 150107

Imantau (Kazakh: Имантау) is a settlement in Aiyrtau District, North Kazakhstan Region of Kazakhstan. It is the head of the Imantau rural district (KATO code - 593243100). Population: 2,459 (2009 census results); 3,101 (1999 census results).

== Geography ==
Imantau village lies by the lake of the same name, 47 kilometers (29 mi) to the SSE of Saumalkol town, the administrative center of the district.
