= Zhabay =

Zhabay Жабай
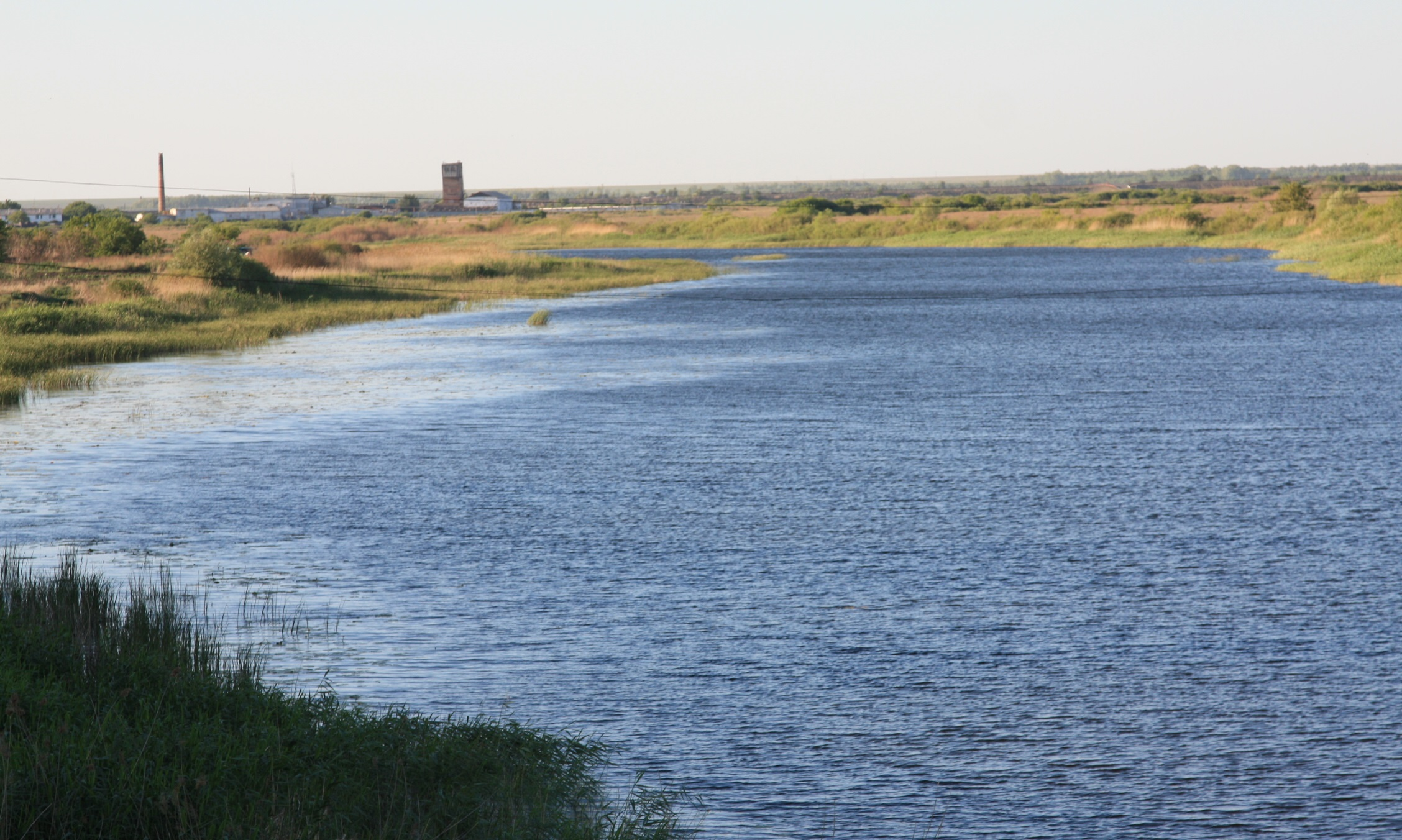
- Panorama of the Zhabay near Atbasar

- Mouth location in Kazakhstan

Location
- Country: Kazakhstan

Physical characteristics
- Source
  - location: Kokshetau Hills
  - coordinates: 52°48′26″N 69°01′32″E
  - elevation: ca 500 m (0.31 mi)
- Mouth: Ishim (river)
  - coordinates: 51°41′55″N 68°21′54″E
  - elevation: 266 m (0.165 mi)
- Length: 196 km (122 mi)
- Basin size: 8,800 km^{2} (3,400 sq mi)
- Discharge
  - average: 0.89 m^{3}/s (31 cu ft/s)

Basin features
- Progression: Ishim→ Irtysh→ Ob→ Kara Sea

The Zhabay (Kazakh: Жабай; Russian: Жабай) is a river in Zerendy, Sandyktau and Atbasar districts, Akmola Region, Kazakhstan. It has a length of 196 km (122 mi) and a basin size of 8,800 km^{2} (3,400 sq mi). The river passes through Sandyktau, Balkashino and Atbasar towns. The water is used in local farms mainly for agricultural field irrigation and watering cattle.

== Course ==
The Zhabay is a right tributary of the Ishim. It has its sources in the Zerendi Mountains, a subrange of the Kokshetau Hills. It flows in a roughly SSW direction all along its course and joins the right bank of the Ishim near Timashevka. The channel in the lower course is wide and flowing slowly. Its width reaches up to 400 m (0.25 mi). The river water is fresh, with a salinity between 0.8 g/L (0.13 oz/imp gal) and 1.0 g/L (0.16 oz/imp gal). The Zhabay freezes towards the end of October and stays under ice until the second half of April. Variations in level are marked, depending from the season and the year. There were catastrophic floods in 2014 and 2017, affecting mainly Atbasar town.

The main tributaries of the Zhabay are the 92 km (57 mi) long Zylandy, the Idabol and the Sarymsakty. There are very few lakes in its basin. Together with the Kamysakty, Kalkutan, Terisakkan, Akkanburlyk and Imanburlyk, the Zhabay is part of the Ishim Water Management Basin.

== Flora and fauna ==
Among the fish species living in the river, the crucian carp, tench, perch, ide, snowtrout, pike, bream and roach deserve mention.

== See also ==
- List of rivers of Kazakhstan
