= Atbasar =

Atbasar Атбасар
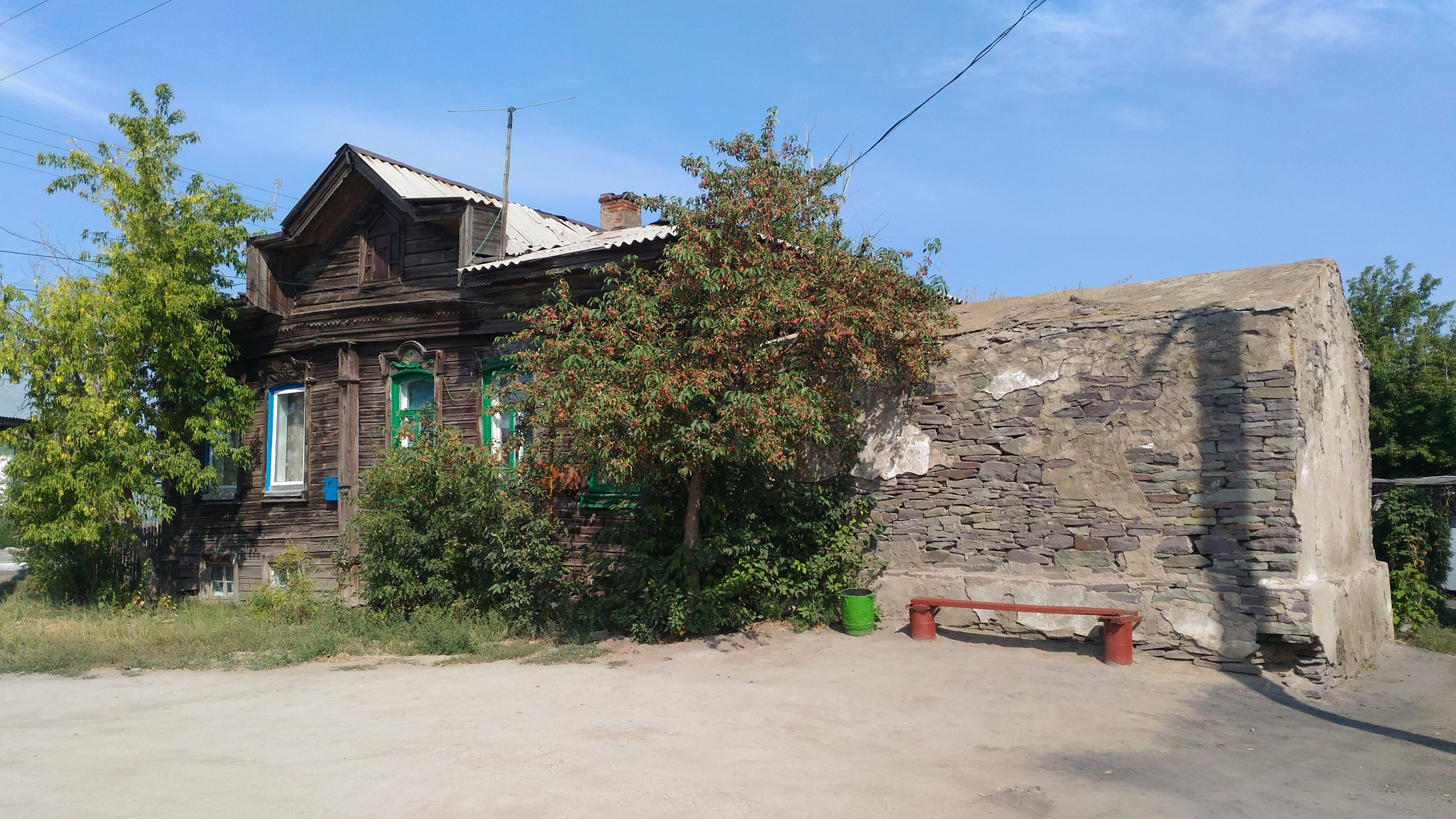
- Late 19th century house in Atbasar

- Location in Kazakhstan Atbasar (Asia)
- Coordinates: 51°48′N 68°20′E
- Country: Kazakhstan
- Region: Akmola Region
- District: Atbasar District

Population (2012)
  - Total: 29,984
- Time zone: UTC+6 (Omsk Time)
- Area code: +7 71643

Atbasar (Kazakh: Атбасар) is a town in Atbasar District, Akmola Region of the northern Kazakhstan. It was founded in 1845. Atbasar is the 44th biggest city in Kazakhstan. Atbasar lies at an altitude of 282 meters above sea level.

Population: 30,436 (2009 census results); 32,288 (1999 census results).

== Geography ==
Atbasar lies by the Zhabay River, a tributary of the Ishim.

== Climate ==
Atbasar has a warm-summer humid continental climate (Dfb) according to the Köppen climate classification. Kazakhstan's lowest recorded temperature was at Atbasar, when it reached −57 °C (−71 °F) in January 1893.

Heavy rains in April 2017 caused a dam to rupture, leaving the whole town under water.

Climate data for Atbasar (1991–2020, extremes 1901–present)
Month	Jan	Feb	Mar	Apr	May	Jun	Jul	Aug	Sep	Oct	Nov	Dec	Year
Record high °C (°F)	6.1 (43.0)	3.3 (37.9)	17.4 (63.3)	30.5 (86.9)	36.3 (97.3)	39.9 (103.8)	41.6 (106.9)	40.0 (104.0)	37.2 (99.0)	28.4 (83.1)	15.9 (60.6)	3.7 (38.7)	41.6 (106.9)
Mean daily maximum °C (°F)	−12.5 (9.5)	−11.0 (12.2)	−3.5 (25.7)	11.1 (52.0)	21.0 (69.8)	25.8 (78.4)	26.7 (80.1)	25.6 (78.1)	19.1 (66.4)	10.3 (50.5)	−2.4 (27.7)	−9.8 (14.4)	8.4 (47.1)
Daily mean °C (°F)	−16.9 (1.6)	−15.8 (3.6)	−8.3 (17.1)	4.9 (40.8)	13.7 (56.7)	18.8 (65.8)	19.9 (67.8)	18.3 (64.9)	11.8 (53.2)	4.1 (39.4)	−6.6 (20.1)	−14.0 (6.8)	2.5 (36.5)
Mean daily minimum °C (°F)	−21.4 (−6.5)	−20.6 (−5.1)	−13.1 (8.4)	−1.1 (30.0)	6.0 (42.8)	11.3 (52.3)	13.0 (55.4)	11.1 (52.0)	5.0 (41.0)	−1.2 (29.8)	−10.4 (13.3)	−18.4 (−1.1)	−3.3 (26.1)
Record low °C (°F)	−57.0 (−70.6)	−43.1 (−45.6)	−39.1 (−38.4)	−27.5 (−17.5)	−11.0 (12.2)	−4.1 (24.6)	2.5 (36.5)	−5.4 (22.3)	−9.1 (15.6)	−23.8 (−10.8)	−36.4 (−33.5)	−43.5 (−46.3)	−57.0 (−70.6)
Average precipitation mm (inches)	19.0 (0.75)	17.2 (0.68)	19.3 (0.76)	19.9 (0.78)	28.3 (1.11)	41.0 (1.61)	49.5 (1.95)	29.6 (1.17)	19.0 (0.75)	23.7 (0.93)	21.5 (0.85)	23.6 (0.93)	311.6 (12.27)
Average precipitation days (≥ 1.0 mm)	6.0	4.9	5.1	4.7	6.0	5.7	7.3	5.4	4.3	5.5	5.6	6.6	67.1
Mean monthly sunshine hours	103	140	194	235	293	326	323	286	219	134	93	84	2,430
Source 1: Pogoda.ru.net
Source 2: NOAA (sun 1961–1990)

== How to get to Atbasar ==
The capital, Astana is 3.5 hours away by train. A narrow-gauge railway line running TU2 diesel locomotives provides local freight transport.

Atbasar also has a small airport.

== Environment ==
Concern has been raised by the United Nations Economic Commission for Europe about exposure of the city to airborne uranium ore dust produced during the transfer of the ore from between railway flatcars.
