= Terisakkan =

Terisakkan Терісаққан / Терсаккан
- Mouth location in Kazakhstan

Location
- Country: Kazakhstan

Physical characteristics
- Source
  - location: Ulytau; Kazakh Uplands
- Mouth: Ishim
  - coordinates: 51.2494°N 67.1592°E
- Length: 334 km (208 mi)
- Basin size: 19,500 km^{2} (7,500 sq mi)
- Discharge
  - average: 52.7 cubic metres per second (1,860 cu ft/s)

Basin features
- Progression: Ishim→ Irtysh→ Ob→ Kara Sea

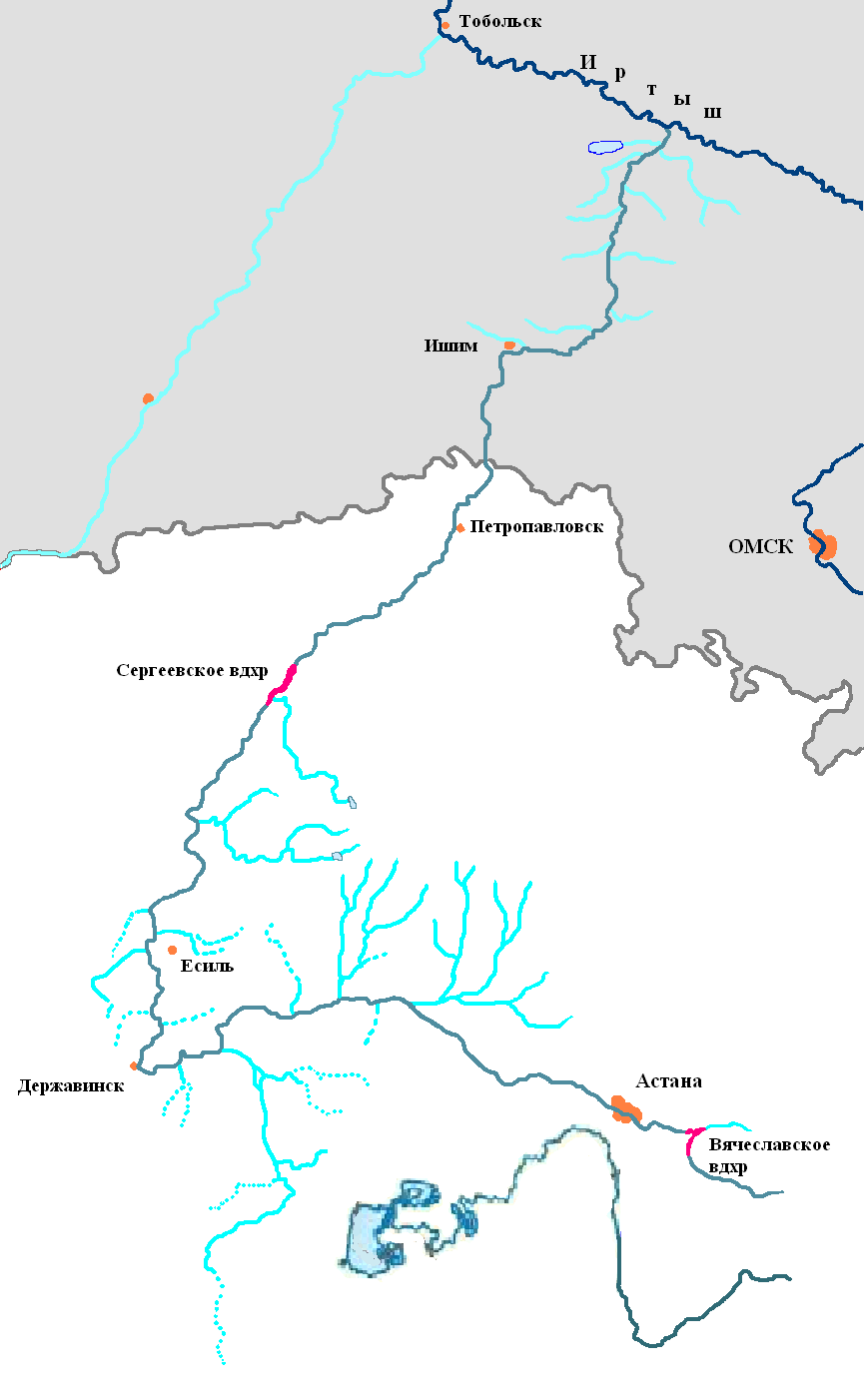
Река Ишим (Есіл)

The Terisakkan (Kazakh: Терісаққан, Terısaqqan; Russian: Терсаккан, Tersakkan) is a river of northern Kazakhstan. A left tributary of the Ishim, it is 334 kilometres (208 mi) long and has a basin area of 19,500 square kilometres (7,500 mi^{2}).

== Geography ==
It flows through the western parts of the Kazakh Uplands and the average annual flow is approximately 2.5 cubic metres per second (88 cu ft/s), with a maximum up to 52.7 cubic metres per second (1,860 cu ft/s). In the upper reaches it dries up, and it freezes to the bottom in some winters. Peak flow is in April during snowmelt. Together with the Kamysakty, Kalkutan, Zhabay, Akkanburlyk and Imanburlyk, the Terisakkan is part of the Ishim Water Management Basin.
