= Starobelka =

Starobelka Старобелка
- Village
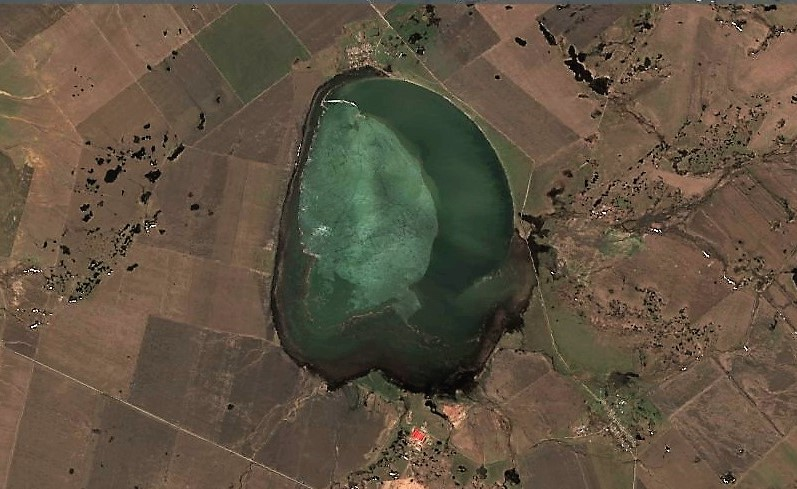
- Starobelka village by the northern end of lake Ulykol

- Location in Kazakhstan
- Coordinates: 52°58′58″N 66°49′45″E
- Country: Kazakhstan
- Region: North Kazakhstan Region
- District: Gabit Musirepov District
- Rural District: Birlik Rural District
- Settled: 1954
- Elevation: 784 ft (239 m)

Population (2009)
  - Total: 277
- Time zone: UTC+5 (East Kazakhstan Time)
- Post code: 150405

Starobelka (Kazakh: Старобелка) is a village in Gabit Musirepov District, North Kazakhstan Region, Kazakhstan. It is part of the Birlik Rural District (KATO code - 596635300). Population: 277 (2009 census results); 490 (1999 census results).

== Geography ==
Starobelka lies by lake Ulykol, 24 kilometers (15 mi) to the south of Novoishim, the district centre.
