= Saumalkol, Aiyrtau District =

Lake in Kazakhstan

Saumalkol
- Саумалкөл
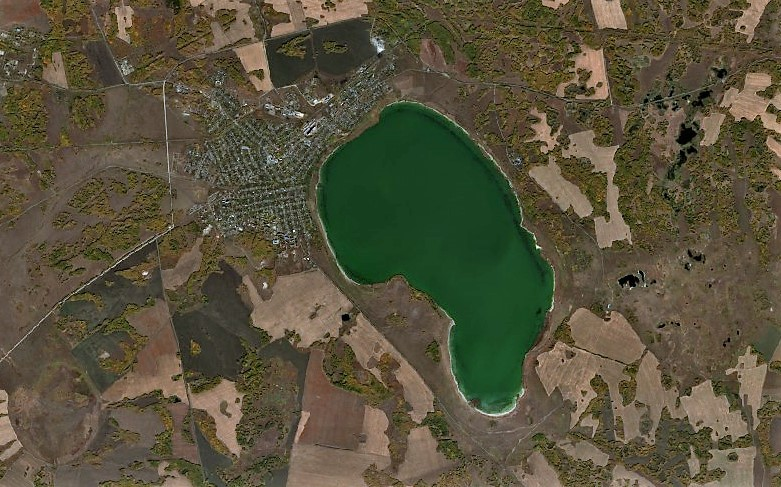
- Sentinel-2 image of the lake

- Location within Kazakhstan
- Location: Kazakh Uplands
- Coordinates: 53°16′25″N 68°09′38″E
- Type: endorheic
- Primary outflows: none
- Basin countries: Kazakhstan
- Max. length: 8.2 kilometers (5.1 mi)
- Max. width: 4.5 kilometers (2.8 mi)
- Surface area: 24.3 square kilometers (9.4 sq mi)
- Average depth: 4.1 meters (13 ft)
- Residence time: UTC+6
- Shore length^{1}: 22.3 kilometers (13.9 mi)
- Surface elevation: 277.5 meters (910 ft)
- Settlements: 2
- ^{1} Shore length is not a well-defined measure.

Saumalkol (Kazakh: Саумалкөл; Russian: Саумалколь) is a salt lake in Aiyrtau District, North Kazakhstan Region, Kazakhstan.

The lake is surrounded by agricultural fields. The district capital Saumalkol town, formerly Volodarskoye, is located by the northwestern banks. The village of Krasnogorka lies near the eastern shore.

== Geography ==
Saumalkol is an endorheic lake in the Kazakh Uplands. It is part of the Ishim River basin. Since the water is salty and has high mineral content it is not suitable for drinking. Lake Shalkar lies 10 kilometers (6.2 mi) to the southeast and Ulken Koskol 13 kilometers (8.1 mi) to the northeast.

The lake is fed mainly by snow and groundwater. Four small rivers flow into its banks. The southern shores are overgrown with reeds. There are fish living in the lake.

== See also ==
- List of lakes of Kazakhstan
