= Ulykol =

Lake in Kazakhstan

- Ұлыкөл
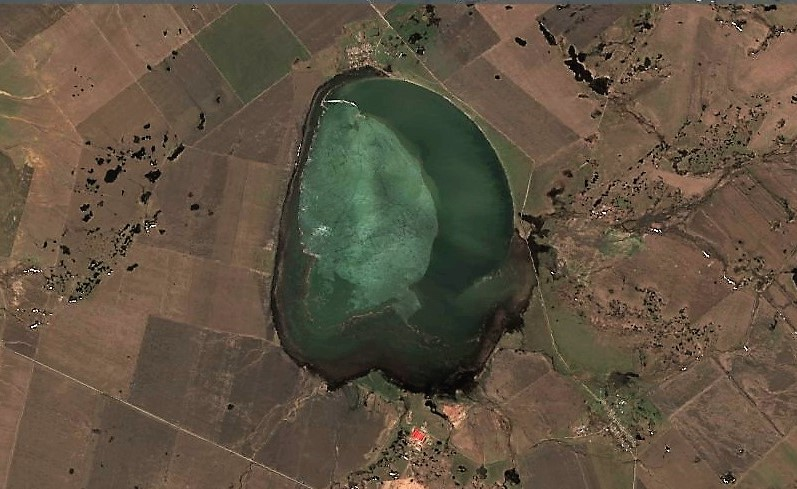
- Sentinel-2 image of the lake

- Location within Kazakhstan
- Location: Ishim Plain; West Siberian Plain
- Coordinates: 52°57′03″N 66°50′42″E
- Basin countries: Kazakhstan
- Max. length: 5.6 kilometers (3.5 mi)
- Max. width: 4.3 kilometers (2.7 mi)
- Surface area: 19.1 square kilometers (7.4 sq mi)
- Max. depth: 3.2 meters (10 ft)
- Residence time: UTC+5
- Shore length^{1}: 168 kilometers (104 mi)
- Surface elevation: 235.3 meters (772 ft)
- Islands: none
- Settlements: Starobelka
- ^{1} Shore length is not a well-defined measure.

Ulykol (Kazakh: Ұлыкөл; Russian: Улыколь), is a lake in Gabit Musirepov District, North Kazakhstan Region, Kazakhstan.

Novoishim town, the administrative center of the district, is located approximately 24 kilometers (15 mi) to the north of the lake. Starobelka village lies by the northern lakeshore. The lake water is used by nearby households.

== Geography ==
Ulykol occupies a tectonic depression at the southern end of the West Siberian Plain. It lies about 12 kilometers (7.5 mi) to the east of the left bank of river Ishim. The lake has an arrowhead shape with the point in the north. The lakeshore is mostly steep, except for short stretches in the southwest and northwest where it is gently sloping. The bottom is flat and clayey, with a maximum depth of 3.2 meters (10 ft). The lake is fed by snow and rainwater. The water of the lake is fresh

Kalmakkol lake is located 62 kilometers (39 mi) to the southeast in the same district and lake Imantau lies 88 kilometers (55 mi) to the east, in the Kokshetau Hills.

== Flora ==
The vegetation near Ulykol is steppe where fescue, sedges and grasses predominate. The non-cultivated sectors are interspersed with plowed agricultural fields.

== See also ==
- List of lakes of Kazakhstan
