= Shalkar (North Kazakhstan Region) =

Shalkar Шалкар
- Village
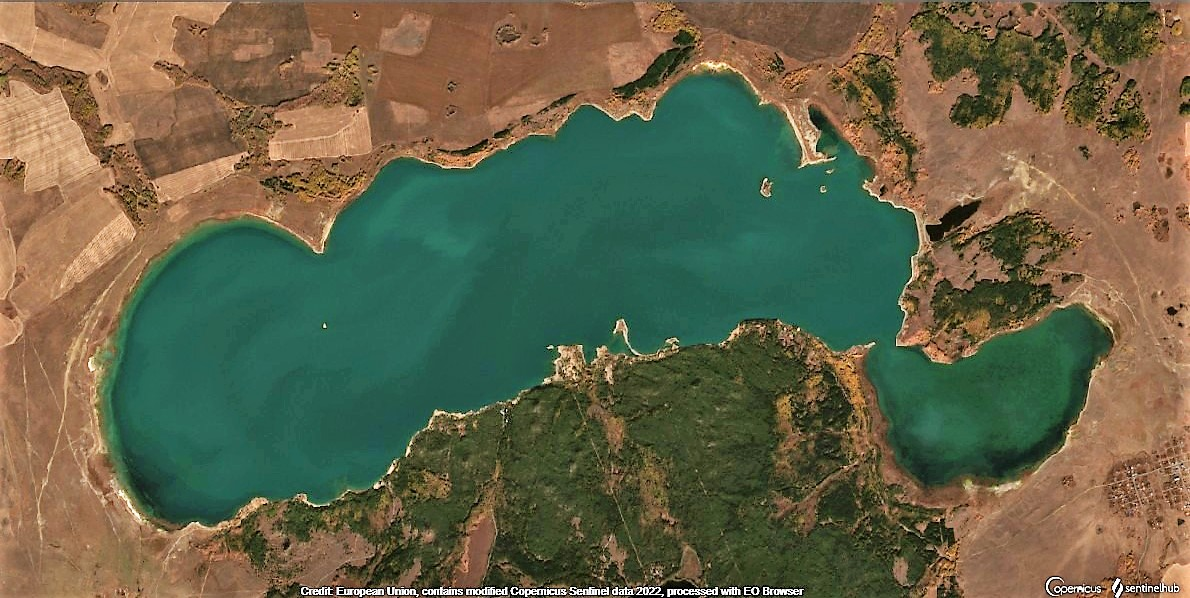
- Shalkar lake with the village in the lower right angle

- Location in Kazakhstan
- Coordinates: 53°10′37″N 68°31′09″E
- Country: Kazakhstan
- Region: North Kazakhstan Region
- District: Aiyrtau District
- Rural District: Lobanov Rural District

Population (2009)
  - Total: 696
- Time zone: UTC+6 (East Kazakhstan Time)
- Post code: 150123

Shalkar (Kazakh: Шалкар) is a settlement in Aiyrtau District, North Kazakhstan Region, Kazakhstan. It is the head of the Lobanov rural district (KATO code - 593230100). Population: 696 (2009 census results); 866 (1999 census results).

== Geography ==
Shalkar town is located close to the southeast of the lake of the same name. Saumalkol, the district capital, lies 27 kilometers (17 mi) to the northwest.

== See also ==
- Kokshetau Lakes
