= Atbasar District =

Coordinates: 51°48′39″N 68°21′26″E

Atbasar
- District
- Atbasar audany
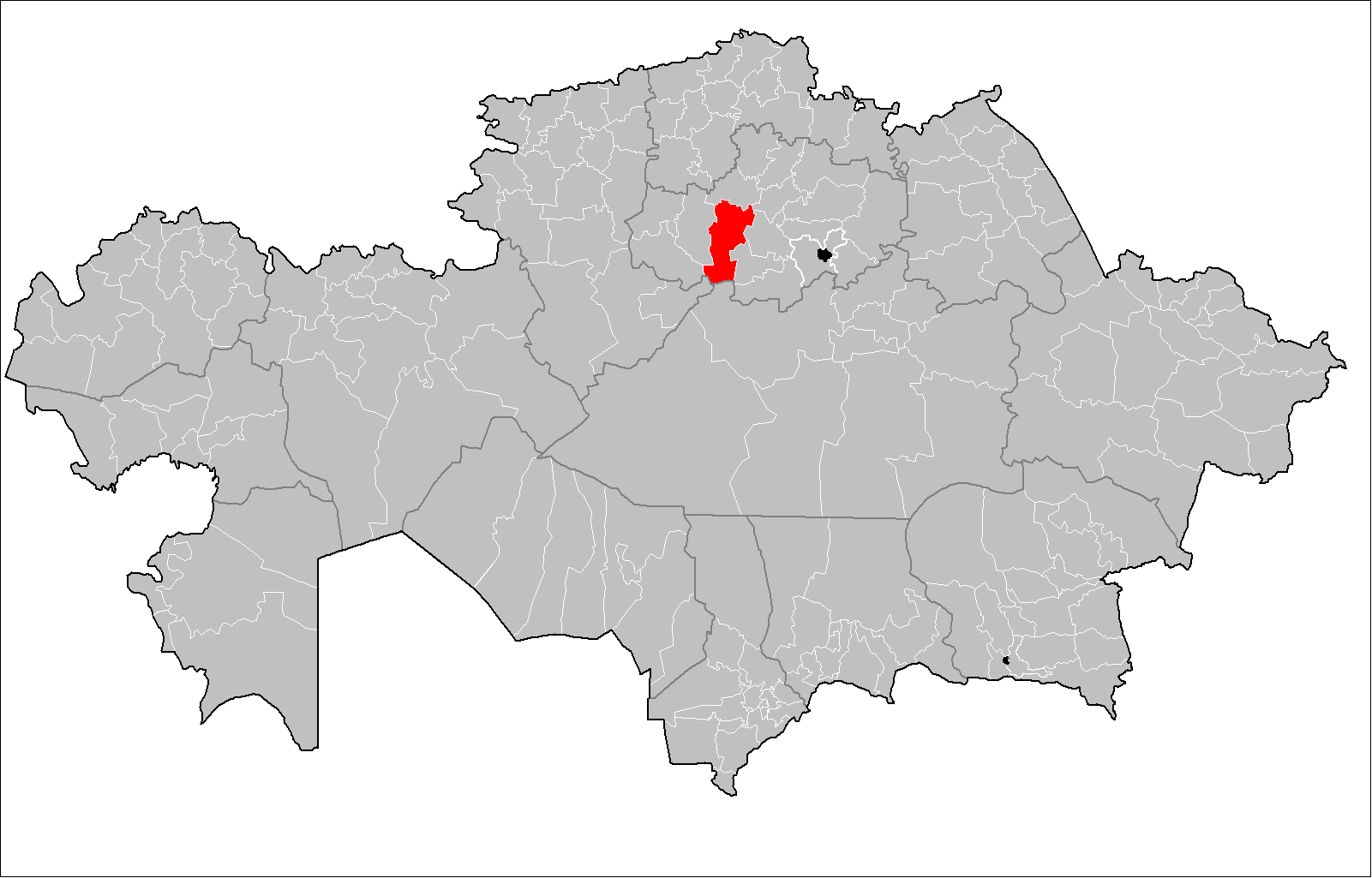
- Country: Kazakhstan
- Region: Aqmola Region
- Administrative center: Atbasar
- Founded: 1928

Government
  - Akim (mayor): Kalzhanov Amanbek Amirkhamzinovich

Area
  - Total: 2,900 sq mi (7,400 km^{2})

Population (2013)
  - Total: 50,046
- Time zone: UTC+6 (East)

Atbasar District (Kazakh: Atbasar audany) is a district of Akmola Region in northern Kazakhstan. The administrative center of the district is the town of Atbasar. Population: 50,981 (2009 census results); 61,009 (1999 census results).

== Geography ==
River Zhabay, a tributary of the Ishim, flows across the district.
