= 15 let Kasakhstan =

- village
- Location within Kazakhstan
- Coordinates: 53°12′38″N 67°21′04″E
- Country: Kazakhstan
- Region: North Kazakhstan Region
- District: Gabit Musirepov District

Population (2009)
  - Total: 243
- Time zone: UTC+7

15 let Kasakhstan (Kazakh: Қазақстанға 15 жыл Russian: 15 лет Казахстана) is a village located in the Gabit Musirepov District of North Kazakhstan Region in northern Kazakhstan. Population: 243 (2009 census results).
