= Zhaksy =

Village in Akmola Region, Kazakhstan

- village
- Location within Kazakhstan
- Coordinates: 51°54′48″N 67°19′57″E
- Country: Kazakhstan
- Region: Akmola Region
- District: Zhaksy District

Population (2015)
  - Total: 4,678
- Time zone: UTC+7

Zhaksy (Kazakh: Жақсы, Jaqsy) is a village in northern-central Kazakhstan. It is the seat of Zhaksy District in Akmola Region.

== Climate ==
Zhaksy has a humid continental climate (Köppen: Dfb), characterized by frigid winters and warm summers.

Climate data for Zhaksy (1991–2020)
Month	Jan	Feb	Mar	Apr	May	Jun	Jul	Aug	Sep	Oct	Nov	Dec	Year
Mean daily maximum °C (°F)	−12.1 (10.2)	−10.9 (12.4)	−4.1 (24.6)	10.0 (50.0)	20.1 (68.2)	25.0 (77.0)	25.6 (78.1)	24.5 (76.1)	17.9 (64.2)	9.2 (48.6)	−3.2 (26.2)	−9.8 (14.4)	7.7 (45.9)
Daily mean °C (°F)	−15.8 (3.6)	−14.9 (5.2)	−7.8 (18.0)	4.7 (40.5)	13.6 (56.5)	18.7 (65.7)	19.7 (67.5)	18.3 (64.9)	11.8 (53.2)	4.1 (39.4)	−6.5 (20.3)	−13.4 (7.9)	2.7 (36.9)
Mean daily minimum °C (°F)	−19.4 (−2.9)	−18.4 (−1.1)	−11.3 (11.7)	0.1 (32.2)	7.6 (45.7)	12.8 (55.0)	14.4 (57.9)	12.8 (55.0)	6.7 (44.1)	0.1 (32.2)	−9.5 (14.9)	−16.9 (1.6)	−1.7 (28.9)
Average precipitation mm (inches)	22.7 (0.89)	23.1 (0.91)	20.5 (0.81)	20.3 (0.80)	24.8 (0.98)	27.2 (1.07)	42.4 (1.67)	28.3 (1.11)	20.4 (0.80)	23.0 (0.91)	25.0 (0.98)	28.3 (1.11)	306.3 (12.06)
Average precipitation days (≥ 1.0 mm)	7.3	6.2	5.8	4.6	5.3	5.4	6.6	5.4	4.1	5.8	6.6	7.3	70.4
Source: NOAA
