= Zhaksy District =

Coordinates: 51.9110°N 67.3060°E

Zhaksy
- District
- Jaqsy audany
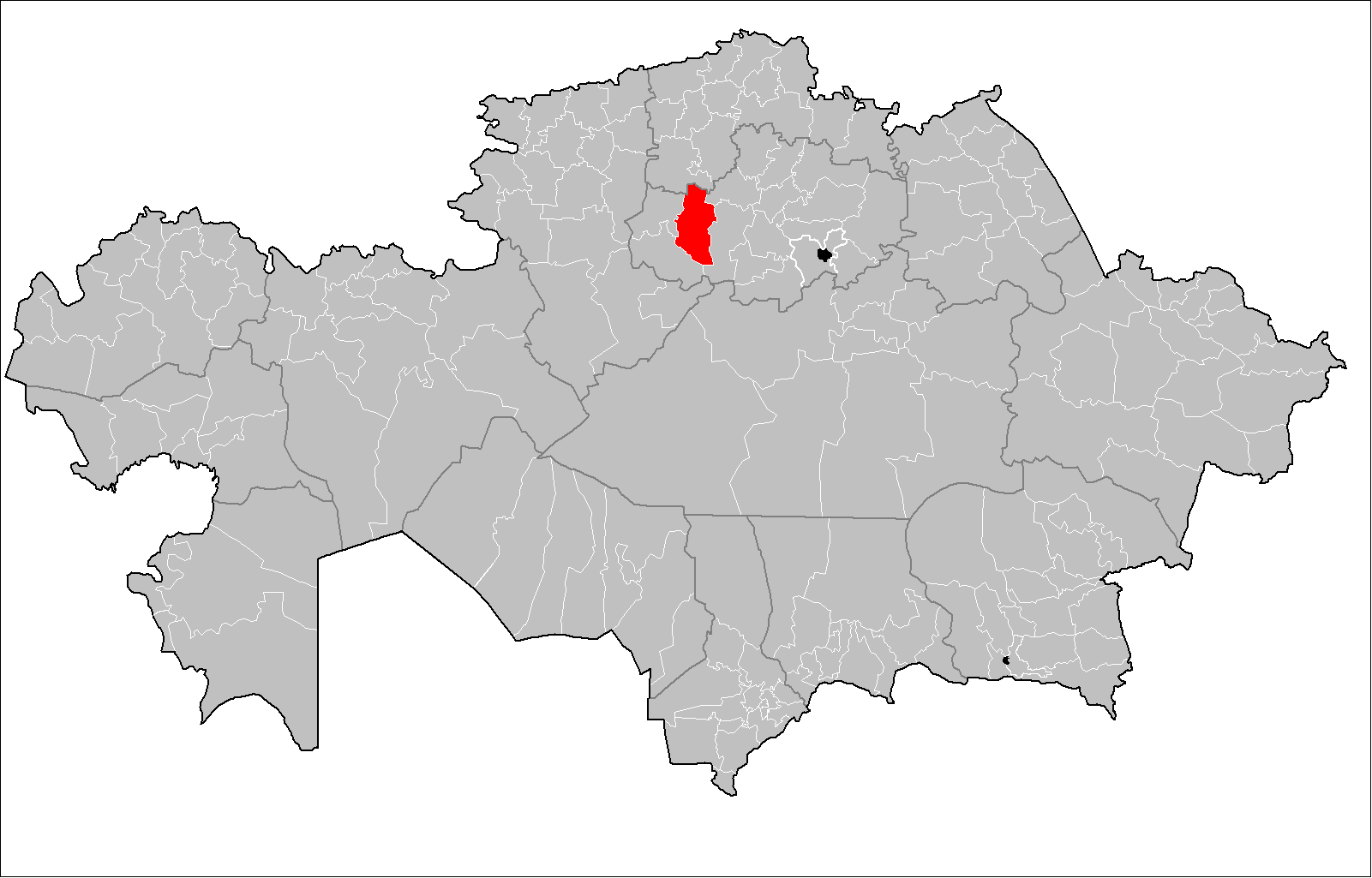
- Country: Kazakhstan
- Region: Aqmola Region
- Administrative center: Zhaksy
- Founded: 1957

Government
  - Akim: Kadralyna Almagul Amanzholovna

Area
  - Total: 2,395,100 acres (969,264 ha)

Population
  - Total: 18 796
- Time zone: UTC+6 (East)

Zhaksy District (Kazakh: Жақсы ауданы, Jaqsy audany) is a district of Akmola Region in northern Kazakhstan. The administrative center of the district is the settlement of Zhaksy. Population: 18 796 (2009 census results); 30,808 (1999 census results).

== History ==
The district was established in 1957, originally named Kiiminsky (since 1964 — Zhaksynsky). From 1970 to 1997, it was part of the Turgay region.

== Geography ==
The total land area is 969,264 hectares (2,395,100 acres). The district borders with Sandyktau, Zharkain, Atbasar and Esil districts of Akmola region. Part of lake Kalmakkol is located in the district.

== Climate conditions ==
The climate is sharply continental: hot in summer, harsh in winter, the duration of the frost-free period is 115–120 days. In terms of air purification and the quality of water consumed, the district is relatively prosperous. Sources of air pollution are industrial enterprises, boilers and vehicles, but these emissions are not a threat to the environment.

== Education ==
There are 21 schools in the district, including 16 high schools, 4 secondary schools, 1 primary school, and 3 additional education facilities.

== Minerals ==
There are some deposits of construction materials in the district. Among which there are currently deposits of crushed stone, gravel, rubble stone, construction sand and clay for the production of bricks of the "150" brand, loam for bricks of the "150" and "200" brand.

== Administrative arrangement ==
The district has 7 rural districts, 7 villages, and 25 localities.
