= Balkashino =

Balkashino Балкашин
- village
- Location within Kazakhstan
- Coordinates: 52°31′3″N 68°45′9″E
- Country: Kazakhstan
- Region: Aqmola Region
- District: Sandyktau District

Population (2015)
  - Total: 4,466
- Time zone: UTC+7

Balkashino (Kazakh: Балкашин, Balkaşin) is a village in northern-central Kazakhstan. It is the seat of Sandyktau District in Aqmola Region.

== Geography ==
Balkashino lies by the banks of the Zhabay River, a tributary of the Ishim.

== Climate ==
Climate data for Balkashino (1991–2020)
Month	Jan	Feb	Mar	Apr	May	Jun	Jul	Aug	Sep	Oct	Nov	Dec	Year
Mean daily maximum °C (°F)	−11.6 (11.1)	−9.9 (14.2)	−2.8 (27.0)	9.6 (49.3)	19.7 (67.5)	24.1 (75.4)	24.7 (76.5)	23.5 (74.3)	17.3 (63.1)	8.8 (47.8)	−3.0 (26.6)	−9.6 (14.7)	7.6 (45.7)
Daily mean °C (°F)	−16.4 (2.5)	−15.1 (4.8)	−7.9 (17.8)	3.6 (38.5)	12.3 (54.1)	17.2 (63.0)	18.2 (64.8)	16.4 (61.5)	10.2 (50.4)	3.1 (37.6)	−7.1 (19.2)	−13.9 (7.0)	1.7 (35.1)
Mean daily minimum °C (°F)	−21.0 (−5.8)	−20.0 (−4.0)	−12.9 (8.8)	−2.1 (28.2)	4.8 (40.6)	9.7 (49.5)	11.7 (53.1)	9.7 (49.5)	3.8 (38.8)	−1.7 (28.9)	−10.9 (12.4)	−18.3 (−0.9)	−3.9 (25.0)
Average precipitation mm (inches)	25.8 (1.02)	21.1 (0.83)	25.2 (0.99)	25.6 (1.01)	38.5 (1.52)	44.5 (1.75)	73.8 (2.91)	43.1 (1.70)	25.8 (1.02)	32.0 (1.26)	32.9 (1.30)	29.5 (1.16)	417.8 (16.45)
Average precipitation days (≥ 1.0 mm)	8.3	6.6	6.3	5.6	7.2	7.6	9.7	7.3	5.2	6.9	8.0	8.1	86.8
Source: NOAA
