= Atbasar Airport =

Airport in Akmola, Kazakhstan

Atbasar
- IATA: ATX; ICAO: none

Summary
- Airport type: Public
- Location: Atbasar
- Elevation AMSL: 308 m / 1,010 ft
- Coordinates: 51°51′06″N 68°21′48″E

Maps
- Location in Kazakhstan
- Interactive map of Atbasar

Runways
Direction	Length		Surface
Direction	m	ft	Surface
14/32	1,500	4,921	Asphalt

Atbasar Airport (IATA: ATX) is an airport in Kazakhstan located 5 km (3.1 mi) north of Atbasar in the Akmola Region. The airport contains a small unpaved airstrip with a small loop taxiway feeding into a small parking area. There are two buildings onsite.
