= Shalkar (Kokshetau) =

Lake in Kazakhstan

- Шалқар
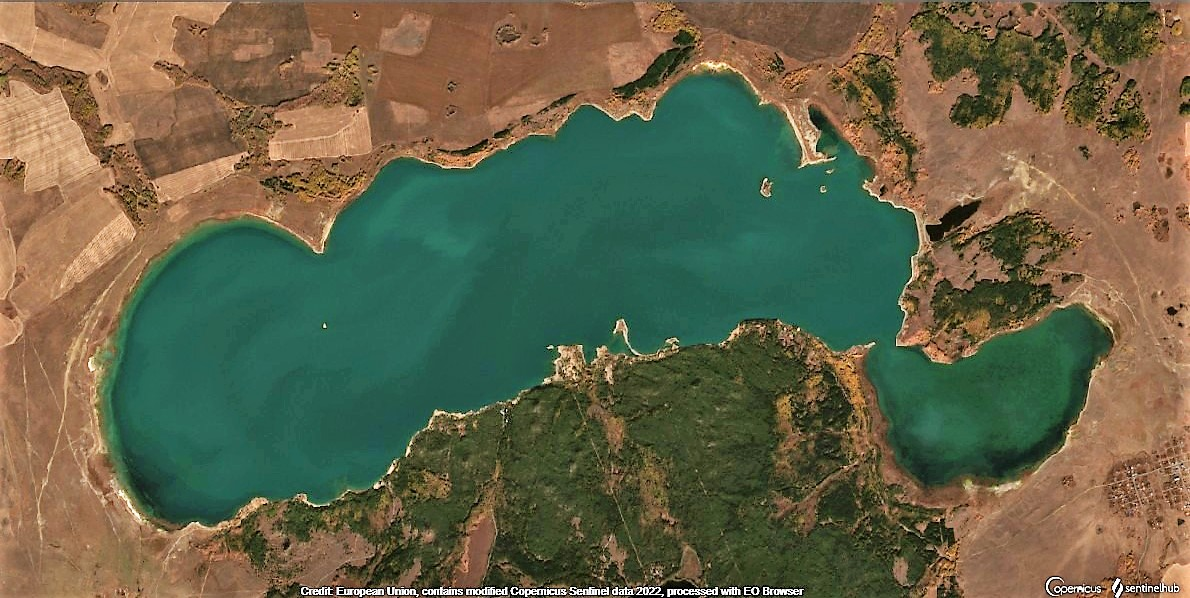
- Sentinel-2 image of the lake in 2021

- Location within Kazakhstan
- Location: Kokshetau Hills, Kazakh Uplands
- Coordinates: 53°12′N 68°24′E
- Part of: Kokshetau Lakes
- Primary inflows: Koi-Bagir
- Primary outflows: Tyun-Tyugur
- Basin countries: Kazakhstan
- Max. length: 9.49 kilometers (5.90 mi)
- Max. width: 2.95 kilometers (1.83 mi)
- Surface area: 29.6 square kilometers (11.4 sq mi)
- Average depth: 5.34 meters (17.5 ft)
- Max. depth: 11 meters (36 ft)
- Residence time: UTC+6
- Shore length^{1}: 38.4 kilometers (23.9 mi)
- Surface elevation: 309.7 meters (1,016 ft)
- Islands: 3
- ^{1} Shore length is not a well-defined measure.

Shalkar (Kazakh: Шалқар; Russian: Шалкар) is a lake in Aiyrtau District, North Kazakhstan Region, Kazakhstan.

Aiyrtau village lies a little to the south of the southwestern tip of the lake and Shalkar village to the southeast of the eastern tip. There are resorts by the lakeshore. Lake Shalkar is part of the Kokshetau National Park, a protected area.

== Geography ==
Shalkar lies in the western sector of the Kokshetau Lakes. It is an elongated lake stretching in an ENE-WSW direction with a cove at the eastern end. The entrance of the cove is 164 meters (538 ft) wide. The southern shore is steep, with up to 8 meters (26 ft) high cliffs, while the remaining lakeshore is gently sloping. The bottom of lake Shalkar is flat, with sandy and rocky areas. There are three islets near the eastern shore of the lake. The water is slightly brackish. Lake Imantau is located 15 kilometers (9.3 mi) to the southwest, Zhamantuz lies 20 kilometers (12 mi) to the west, Saumalkol 10 kilometers (6.2 mi) to the northwest and Ulken Koskol 15 kilometers (9.3 mi) to the north.

The Koi-Bagir river flows into the lake during the spring floods from the northwestern side. The outflow of Shalkar is the river Tyun-Tyugur, flowing southwards from the southwestern end.

== Flora and fauna ==
There are forests close to the southern shore of the lake, with birch, aspen and sea buckthorn, among other trees and shrubs. From the fish species living in the lake, the perch is autochthonous. The least cisco, peled, carp, Prussian carp and crucian carp found in Shalkar have been introduced.

== See also ==
- List of lakes of Kazakhstan
