= Arykbalyk (village) =

Arykbalyk Арықбалық
- Village
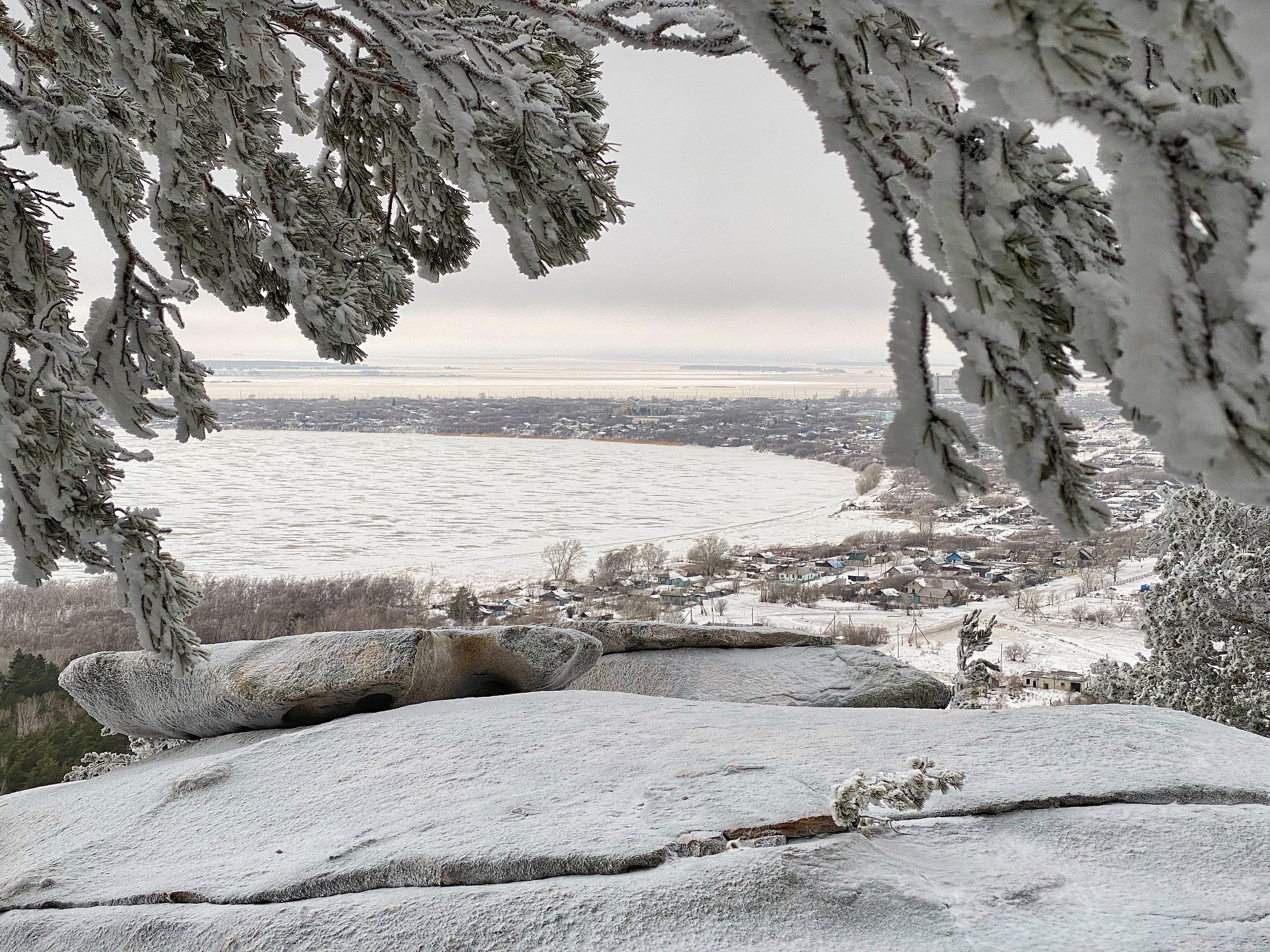
- Winter panorama of the village

- Location in Kazakhstan
- Coordinates: 52°57′15″N 68°11′55″E
- Country: Kazakhstan
- Region: North Kazakhstan Region
- District: Aiyrtau District
- Rural District: Arykbalyk Rural District
- Settled: 1850

Population (2009)
  - Total: 2,851
- Time zone: UTC+5
- Post code: 150103

Arykbalyk (Kazakh: Арықбалық; Russian: Арыкбалык) is a settlement in Aiyrtau District, North Kazakhstan Region of Kazakhstan. It is the head of the Arykbalyk rural district (KATO code - 593235100). Population: 2,851 (2009 census results); 4,010 (1999 census results).

== Geography ==
Arykbalyk village lies by the lake of the same name, 47 kilometers (29 mi) to the south of Saumalkol town, the administrative center of the district.
