= Qaraötkel Bridge =

Arch bridge in Astana, Kazakhstan

Qaraötkel Bridge Қараөткел көпірі
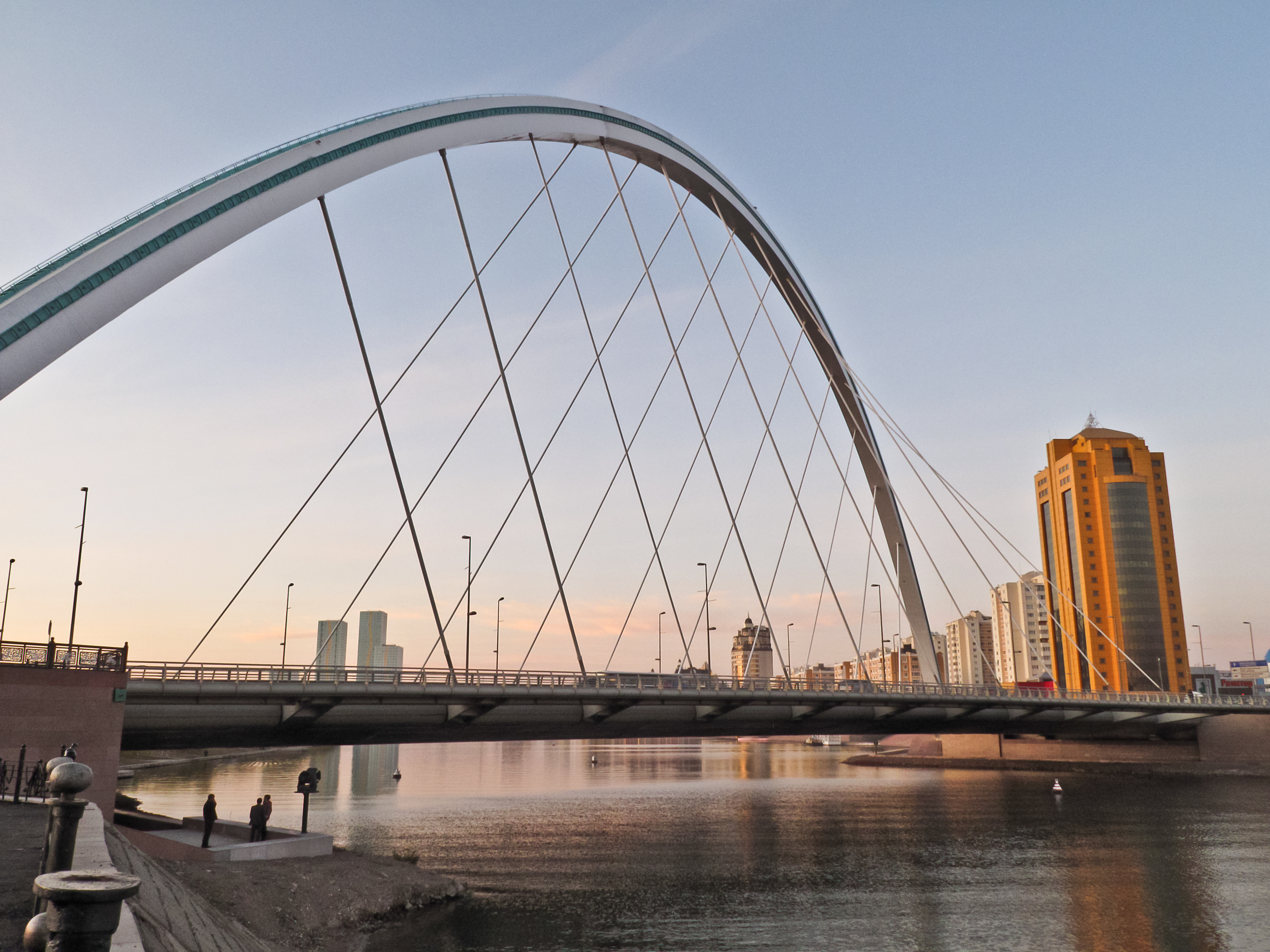
- View of the Ramstore Bridge.
- Coordinates: 51.151850°N 71.428037°E
- Crosses: Ishim River
- Locale: Astana, Kazakhstan
- Official name: Ramstore Arch Bridge
- Other name: Astana Bridge

Characteristics
- Design: Arch
- Material: Steel
- Total length: 180 m (590 ft)
- Width: 50 m (160 ft)
- Height: 60 m (200 ft)
- Traversable?: Yes
- Longest span: 180 m (590 ft)

History
- Architect: NPO Mostovik OOO
- Designer: IHI Corporation
- Contracted lead designer: Samko Engineering & Contracting Co. Inc.
- Construction start: 30 April 2008
- Construction end: 1 December 2008
- Construction cost: US$472 million
- Inaugurated: 2 December 2008

Location
- Interactive map of Qaraötkel Bridge

The Qaraötkel Bridge (Kazakh: Қараөткел көпірі, romanized: Qaraötkel köpırı, lit. 'Crossroads Bridge'), also known as Ramstor Bridge (Kazakh: Рамстор көпірі так кажетс], romanized: Ramstor köpırı) is an arch bridge spanning the Ishim River in Astana, Kazakhstan. It was built between 2007 and 2008 as a road bridge crossing the Ishim River.

== Accidents and incidents ==
- 23 July 2014: two young couples climbed on top of the arch to be photographed. The police removed the couples from the bridge and were then sued.
- 28 March 2016: a 39-year-old resident jumped off from the bridge in a suicide attempt. The victim died without regaining consciousness.
- 11 June 2016: three 15-year-old boys climbed on top to the arch for an attempt to make a selfie. The police escorted the boys and were taken to the police division.
- 18 July 2016: at about 8:00 am, a drunk 24-year-old male climbed on top of the arch. According to the police, the person was moderately intoxicated.

== Gallery ==
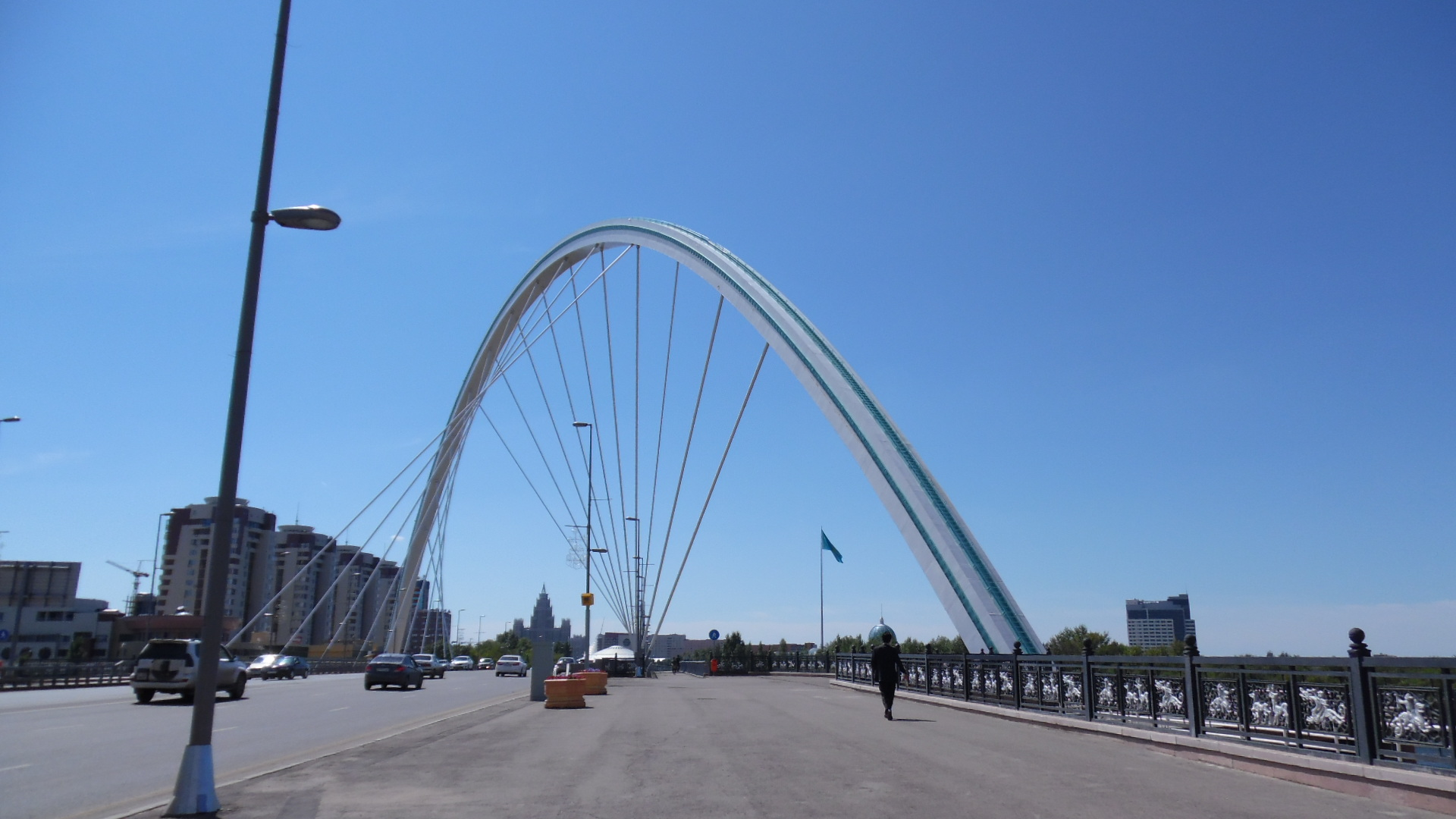

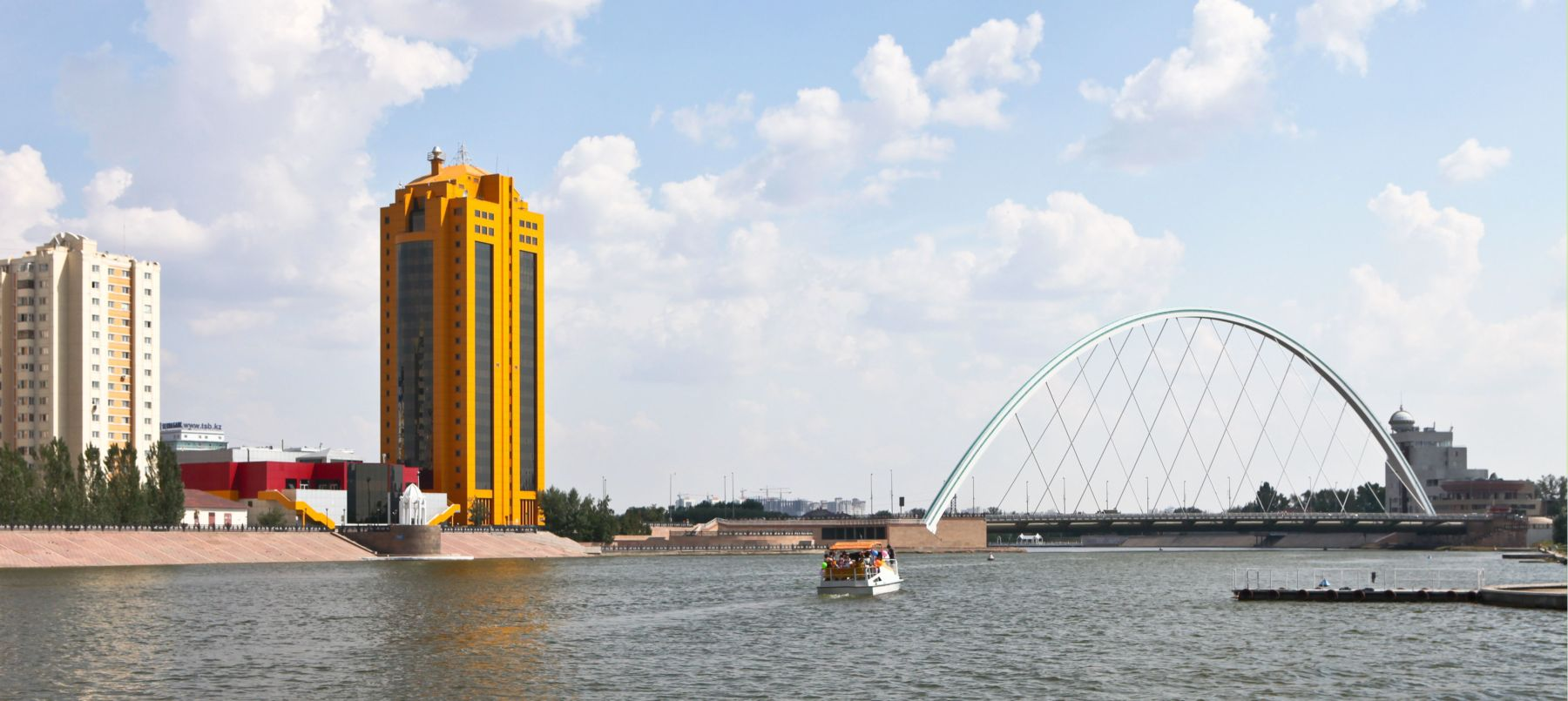

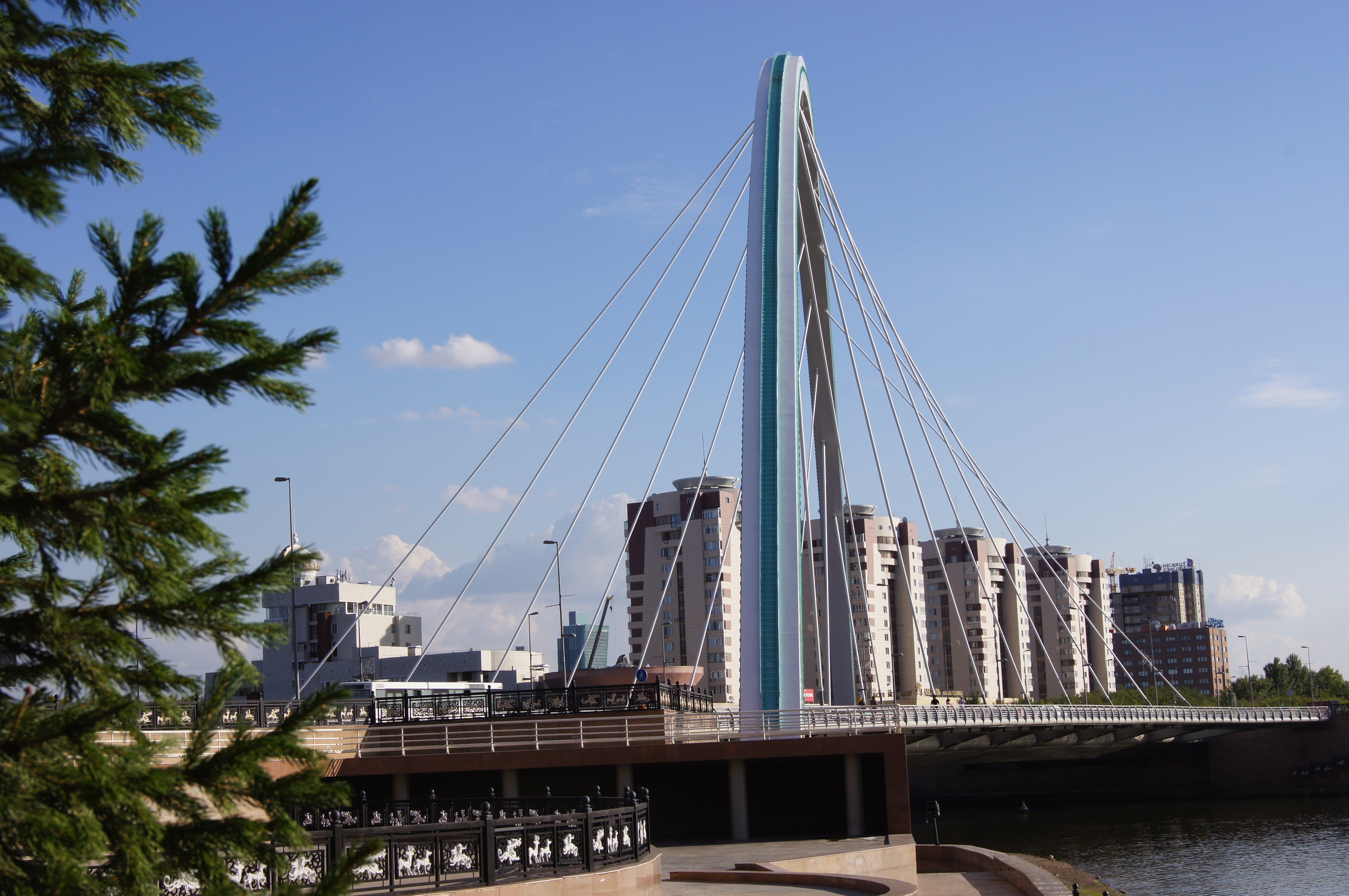

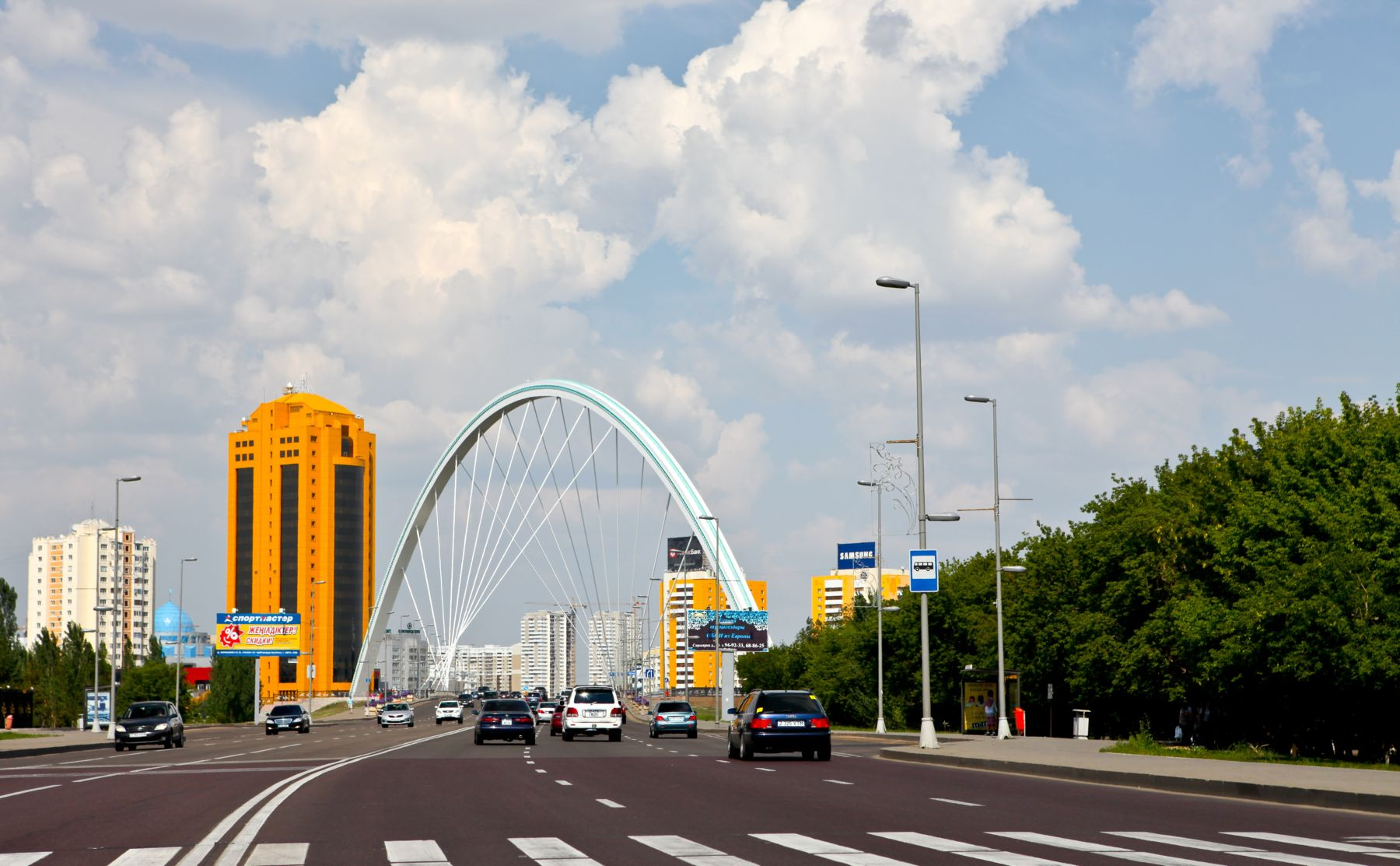
