= Sandyktau District =

Coordinates: 52°32′24″N 68°44′24″E

Sandyktau
- District
- Sandyqtau audany
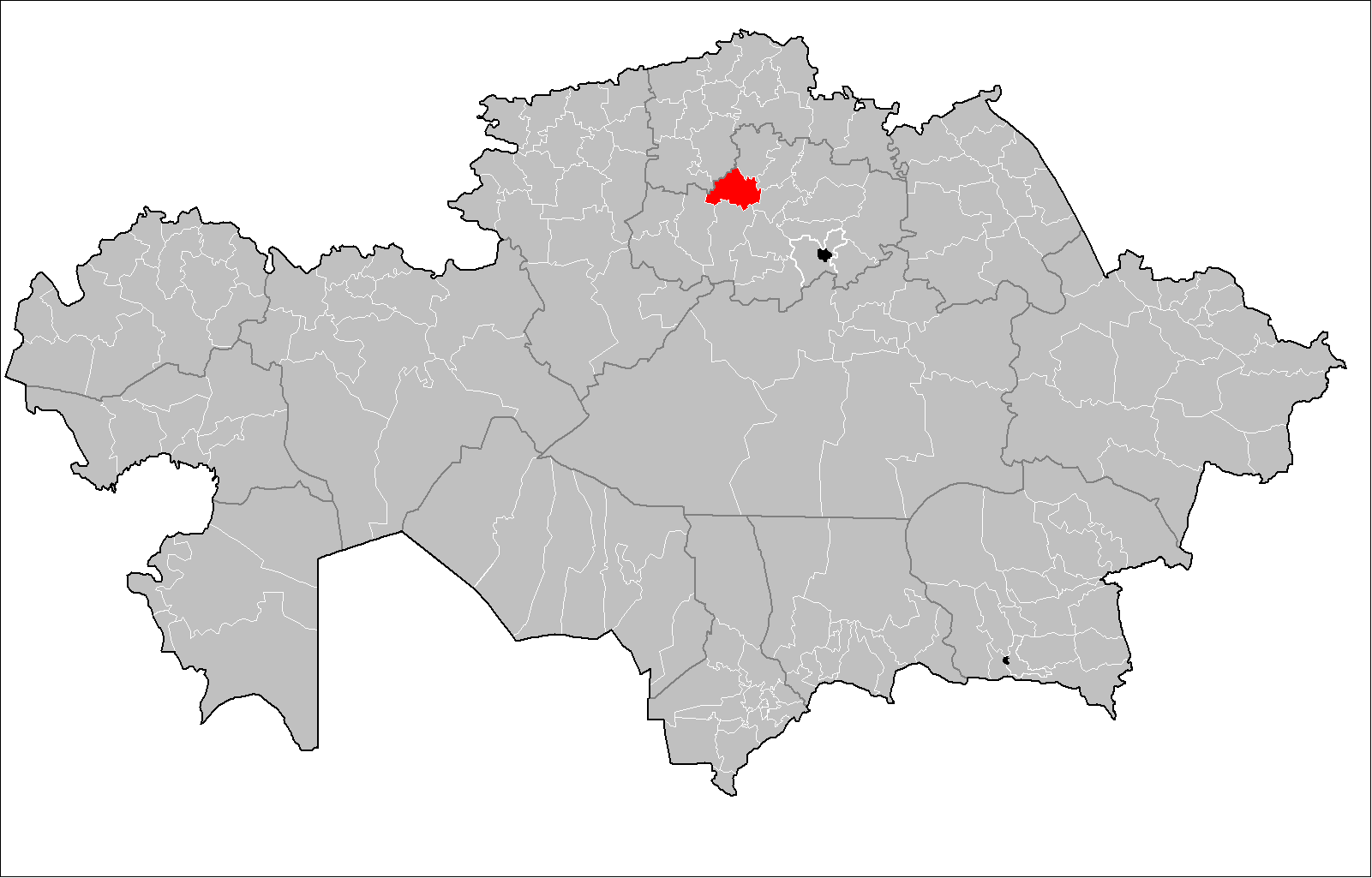
- Country: Kazakhstan
- Region: Aqmola Region
- Administrative center: Balkashino
- Founded: 1936

Government
  - Akim: Zhusupbekov Erbol Karimovich

Area
  - Total: 2,500 sq mi (6,400 km^{2})

Population (2013)
  - Total: 20,311
- Time zone: UTC+6 (East)

Sandyktau District (Kazakh: Сандықтау ауданы, Sandyqtau audany) is a district of Aqmola Region in northern Kazakhstan. The administrative center of the district is the selo of Balkashino. Population: 21,521 (2009 census results); 28,729 (1999 census results).

== History ==
Sandyktausky district was formed on January 17, 1928 as part of Petropavlovsky district with the center in the village of Balkashino. For a number of years it belonged to the Karaganda, North-Kazakhstan regions, and from October 14, 1939, it became part of the Akmola region.

From January 9, 1935, it was called Molotovsky, on August 30, 1957 it was renamed into Balkashinsky, and on November 14, 1997 it was renamed into Sandyktausky. There are 5 settlements in the region, which are over 100 years old.

== Geography ==
River Zhabay, a tributary of the Ishim, flows across the district.
