= Novoishim =

Novoishim Новоишим
- Village
- Horses graze in the Ishim basin nearby Novoishim in 2023

- Location in Kazakhstan
- Coordinates: 53°11′53″N 66°46′10″E
- Country: Kazakhstan
- Region: North Kazakhstan Region
- District: Gabit Musirepov District
- Rural District: Novoishim Rural District
- Settled: 1954

Population (2019)
  - Total: 12,064
- Time zone: UTC+6 (East Kazakhstan Time)
- Post code: 150400, 150401

Novoishim (Kazakh: Новоишим; Russian: Новоишимское) is a village and the administrative center of Gabit Musirepov District, North Kazakhstan Region, Kazakhstan. It is also the head of Novoishim Rural District (KATO code 596630100). It was founded as "Kozyrnoye" in 1914. Its population was 11,284 (2009 census results), and later 10,152 (1999 census results).

== Geography ==
Novoishim lies by the Ishim River, 270 kilometers (170 mi) to the southwest of Petropavl city. Ulykol lake is located 24 kilometers (15 mi) to the south.
