= Akkanburlyk =

Akkanburlyk Аққанбұрлық
- Mouth location in Kazakhstan

Location
- Country: Kazakhstan

Physical characteristics
- Mouth: Ishim
  - coordinates: 52.7483°N 66.6075°E
- Length: 176 km (109 mi)

Basin features
- Progression: Ishim→ Irtysh→ Ob→ Kara Sea

The Akkanburlyk (Kazakh: Аққанбұрлық, Aqqanbūrlyq) is a river of the North Kazakhstan Region, Kazakhstan. It is a right tributary of the Ishim.

== Course ==
The river has its sources in the western edge of the Kokshetau Hills. In its upper course it flows through lake Zhaksy-Zhalgyztau. It heads roughly from east to west all along its course. It flows into the right bank of the Ishim River, to the ESE of the Urozhainoye village. The Akkanburlyk flows across the territory of the Aiyrtau and Gabit Musirepov districts of North Kazakhstan Region.
