= Gabit Musirepov District =

Coordinates: 53°11′53″N 66°46′10″E

Gabit Musirepov Ғабит Мүсірепов
- District
- Ғабит Мүсірепов ауданы
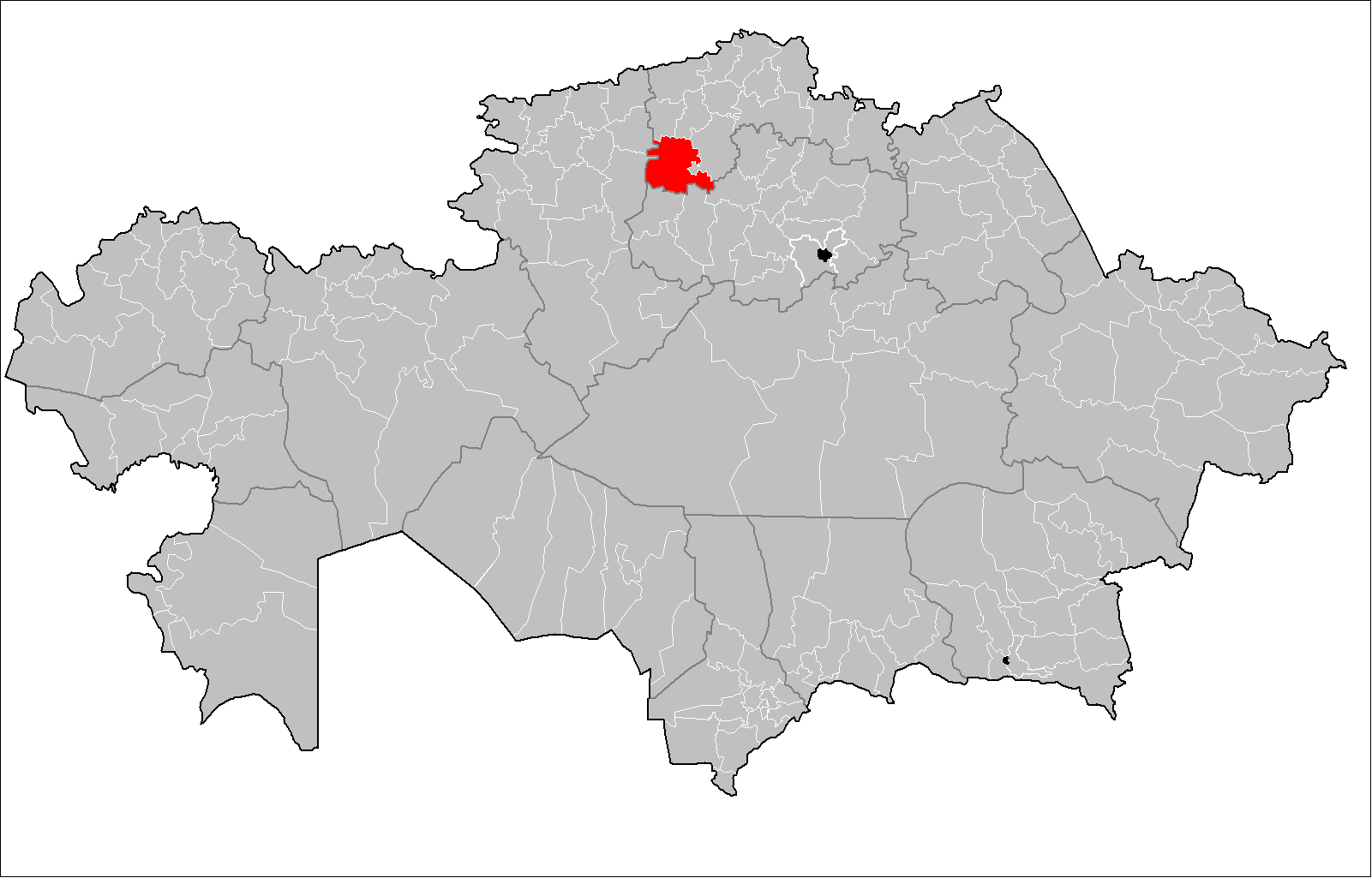
- Country: Kazakhstan
- Region: North Kazakhstan Region
- Administrative center: Novoishim

Government
  - Akim: Ruslan Anbayev

Population (2013)
  - Total: 44,144
- Time zone: UTC+6 (East)

Gabit Musirepov (Kazakh: Ғабит Мүсірепов ауданы, Ğabit Müsırepov audany) is a district of North Kazakhstan Region in northern Kazakhstan. The administrative center of the district is the selo of Novoishim. Population: 44,144 (2013 estimate); 45,538 (2009 census results); 54,629 (1999 census results).

== Name ==
The district was named after Soviet Kazakh writer, playwright and author of libretto to Kazakh opera Kyz-Zhibek, Gabit Musirepov.

== Geography ==
Lakes Kalmakkol and Ulykol are located in the district. Starobelka village lies by lake Ulykol.
