= Saumalkol (North Kazakhstan) =

Saumalkol Саумалкөл
- Village
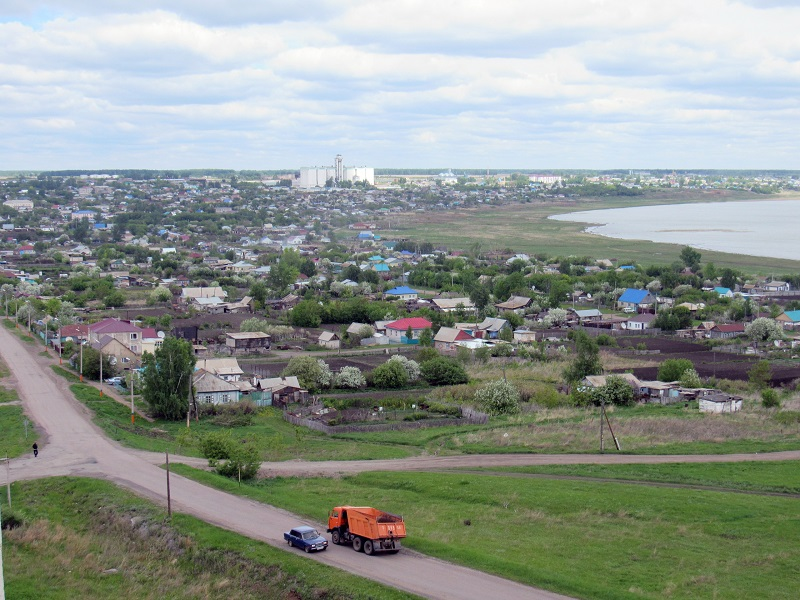
- View of Saumalkol by the lakeshore

- Location in Kazakhstan
- Coordinates: 53°17′29″N 68°06′34″E
- Country: Kazakhstan
- Region: North Kazakhstan Region
- District: Aiyrtau District
- Rural District: Volodar Rural District
- Settled: 1866

Population (2019)
  - Total: 9,480
- Time zone: UTC+5 (Kazakhstan Time)
- Post code: 150100

Saumalkol (Kazakh: Саумалкөл), known as Volodarskoye until 1997, is a settlement and the administrative center of Aiyrtau District in North Kazakhstan Region of Kazakhstan. It is the head of the Volodar rural district (KATO code - 593230100). Population: 10,234 (2009 census results); 12,010 (1999 census results).

== Geography ==
Saumalkol town lies by the lake of the same name, 248 kilometers (154 mi) to the southwest of Petropavl and 90 kilometers (56 mi) to the west of Kokshetau.

=== Climate ===
Saumalkol has a humid continental climate (Köppen: Dfb) with frigid winters and warm summers.

Climate data for Saumalkol (1991–2020)
Month	Jan	Feb	Mar	Apr	May	Jun	Jul	Aug	Sep	Oct	Nov	Dec	Year
Mean daily maximum °C (°F)	−11.2 (11.8)	−9.7 (14.5)	−2.2 (28.0)	10.1 (50.2)	19.7 (67.5)	24.0 (75.2)	24.5 (76.1)	23.2 (73.8)	17.1 (62.8)	8.7 (47.7)	−3.0 (26.6)	−9.3 (15.3)	7.7 (45.9)
Daily mean °C (°F)	−15.2 (4.6)	−14.0 (6.8)	−6.8 (19.8)	4.4 (39.9)	12.9 (55.2)	17.7 (63.9)	18.7 (65.7)	17.0 (62.6)	10.9 (51.6)	3.8 (38.8)	−6.5 (20.3)	−13.0 (8.6)	2.5 (36.5)
Mean daily minimum °C (°F)	−18.9 (−2.0)	−18.0 (−0.4)	−10.9 (12.4)	−0.3 (31.5)	6.8 (44.2)	11.9 (53.4)	13.5 (56.3)	11.7 (53.1)	5.9 (42.6)	−0.2 (31.6)	−9.8 (14.4)	−16.5 (2.3)	−2.1 (28.2)
Average precipitation mm (inches)	25.0 (0.98)	20.6 (0.81)	25.0 (0.98)	30.1 (1.19)	38.5 (1.52)	47.0 (1.85)	80.5 (3.17)	51.5 (2.03)	33.7 (1.33)	39.6 (1.56)	35.8 (1.41)	31.3 (1.23)	458.6 (18.06)
Average precipitation days (≥ 1.0 mm)	7.8	6.6	6.4	6.3	6.9	7.4	9.8	8.2	6.1	8.5	9.0	8.8	91.8
Source: NOAA
