= Aiyrtau District =

Coordinates: 53.291382°N 68.098755°E

Aiyrtau
- District
- Айыртау ауданы
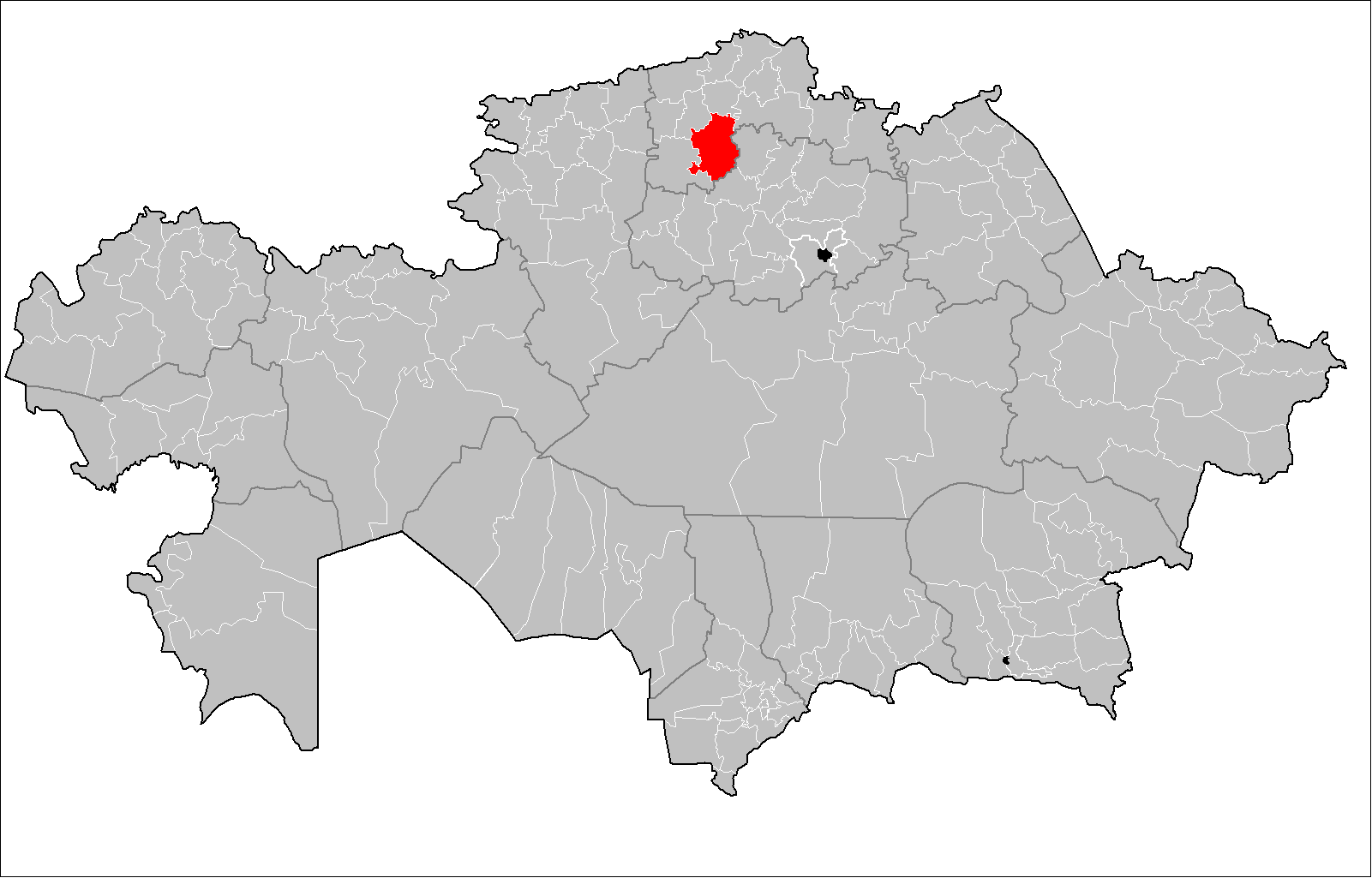
- Country: Kazakhstan
- Region: North Kazakhstan Region
- Administrative center: Saumalkol

Government
  - Akim: Meiram Mendibaev

Population (2013)
  - Total: 41,234
- Time zone: UTC+6 (East)

Aiyrtau (Kazakh: Айыртау ауданы, Aiyrtau audany) is a district of North Kazakhstan Region in northern Kazakhstan. The administrative center of the district is Saumalkol village. Population: 41,234 (2013 estimate); 44,129 (2009 census results); 58,324 (1999 census results).

== Geography ==
Lakes Saumalkol, Imantau and Zhaksy-Zhalgyztau are located in the district.
