= Ishim (river) =

River in Kazakhstan and Russia

Esil
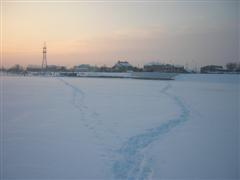
- The river Ishim in Astana, a popular thoroughfare in the winter when it is frozen over.

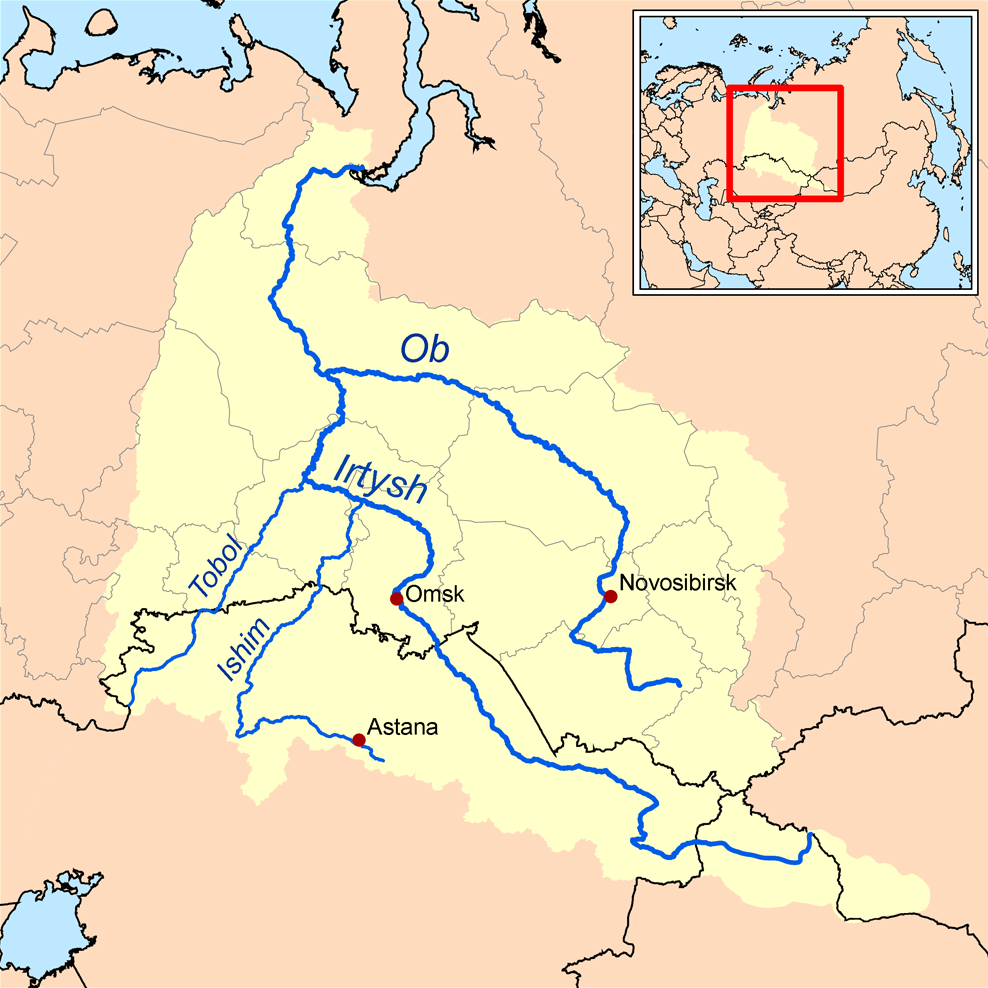
- Map of the Ob–Irtysh drainage basin showing the Ishim River

Location
- Country: Kazakhstan, Russia

Physical characteristics
- Source: Kazakh Uplands
  - location: Sarybel District, Kazakhstan
  - coordinates: 50°37′55″N 73°16′01″E
  - elevation: 485 m (1,591 ft)
- Mouth: Irtysh
  - location: Ust-Ishim, Russia
  - coordinates: 57.6981°N 71.1975°E
  - elevation: 42 m (138 ft)
- Length: 2,450 km (1,520 mi)
- Basin size: 177,000 km^{2} (68,000 sq mi)
- Discharge
  - average: 56.3 m^{3}/s (1,990 cu ft/s)

Basin features
- Progression: Irtysh→ Ob→ Kara Sea

The Ishim (Russian: Ишим, IPA: [ɪˈʂɨm]; Kazakh: Есіл, romanized: Esıl, IPA: [jesɪ́l]) is a river running through Kazakhstan and Russia. It is 2,450 kilometres (1,520 mi) long, and has a drainage basin of 177,000 square kilometres (68,000 sq mi). Its average discharge is 56.3 cubic metres per second (1,990 cu ft/s). It is a left tributary of the Irtysh. The Ishim is partly navigable in its lower reaches. The upper course of the Ishim passes through Astana, the capital of Kazakhstan. In Russia, the course of the river travels through a vast marshland, and has countless meanders and oxbow lakes. The river freezes from late November until March.

== Main tributaries ==
The largest tributaries of the Ishim are, from source to mouth:

- Kalkutan (right)
- Zhabay (right)
- Terisaqqan (left)
- Aqqanburlyq (right)
- Karasul (left)
- Barsuk (right)

== In Astana ==
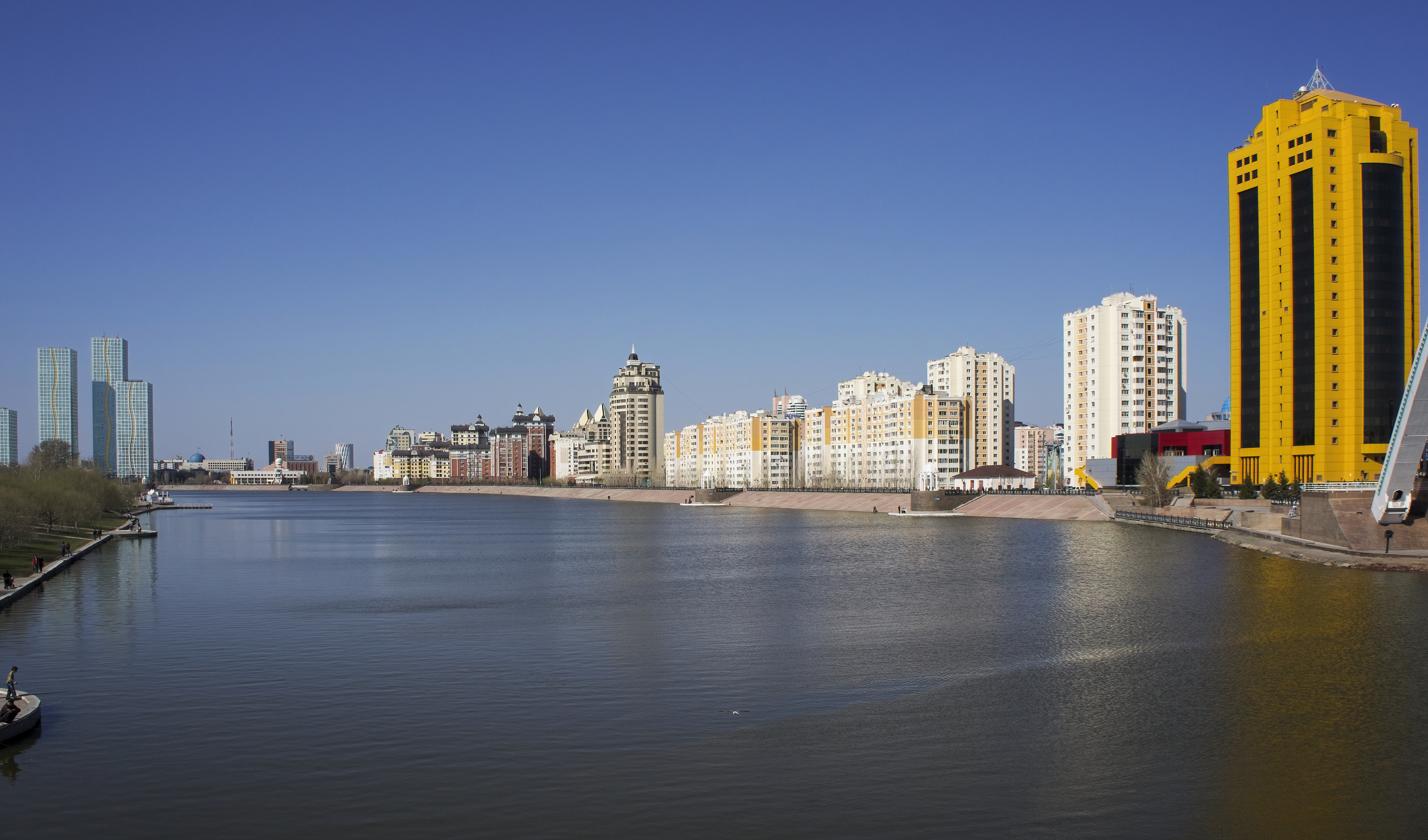
Ishim in Astana

According to the President of Kazakhstan, Nursultan Nazarbayev, Astana was chosen as the capital in part due to the presence of the river. The city is also divided into two sections, the Right (northern) Bank of the Ishim or the old town, and the Left (southern) Bank, where the new government buildings such as the Ak Orda, the House of the Government, and the Supreme Court are located, as well as many prestigious apartment and living complexes.

Since 1998, the Ishim in Astana has been actively managed, for flood management and maintaining water level, in order to provide for recreational use and ensure the showpiece appearance. It is dammed downstream of central Astana, keeping its level higher than it otherwise would be most of the time, while the river bottom has been made deeper, in order to let flood waters through faster. In central Astana, near the city park, there is now a public beach and pedalo boat rental; meanwhile, if the river had not been dammed, "citizens would have been able to walk across it". Another dam will be constructed upstream of the city, for better flood control.

The city authorities also have plans for further deepening the river, which will eventually allow small passenger boats to operate on a 22-kilometre (14 mi) section of the river through the nation's capital.

To maintain the desired level of water flow, water is pumped to the Ishim from the Irtysh, via the Irtysh–Karaganda Canal and a pipeline.

== See also ==
- Ishim Steppe
- Sergeyev Dam
- Ust'-Ishim man
