= Outline of Kazakhstan =

Landlocked country in Central Asia and Eastern Europe

The Flag of Kazakhstan

The Coat of arms of Kazakhstan

An enlargeable map of the Republic of Kazakhstan

The following outline is provided as an overview of and topical guide to Kazakhstan:

The Republic of Kazakhstan is a landlocked sovereign country located across both Central Asia and Eastern Europe. Ranked as the ninth largest country in the world as well as the world's largest landlocked country, it has a territory of 2,727,300 km^{2} (greater than Western Europe). It is bordered by Russia, Kyrgyzstan, Turkmenistan, Uzbekistan and China. The country also borders on a significant part of the Caspian Sea.

Vast in size, the land in Kazakhstan is very diverse in types of terrain: flatlands, steppes, taigas, rock-canyons, hills, deltas, mountains, snow-capped mountains, and deserts. Kazakhstan has the 62nd largest population in the world, with a population density of less than 6 people per square kilometre (15 per sq. mi.).

Kazakhstan declared itself an independent country on December 16, 1991, the last Soviet republic to do so. Its communist-era leader, Nursultan Nazarbayev, became the country's new president. Since independence, Kazakhstan has pursued a balanced foreign policy and worked to develop its economy, especially its hydrocarbon industry. While the country's economic outlook is improving, President Nazarbayev maintains strict control over the country's politics. Several opposition leaders and journalists have been killed in recent years, and Western observers generally do not consider Kazakhstan's elections to be free and fair. Nevertheless, Kazakhstan's international prestige is building. It is now considered to be the dominant state in Central Asia. The country belongs to many international organizations, including the United Nations, NATO's Partnership for Peace, the Commonwealth of Independent States, and the Shanghai Cooperation Organisation. In 2010, Kazakhstan will chair the Organization for Security and Cooperation in Europe. In 2011, it formed a customs union with Russia and Belarus.

Kazakhstan is ethnically and culturally diverse, in part due to the mass deportations of many ethnic groups to the country during Stalin's rule. Kazakhs are the largest group, followed by Russians. Kazakhstan allows freedom of religion, and many different beliefs are represented in the country. Islam is the primary religion, followed by Orthodox Christianity. The official language is Kazakh, though Russian is still commonly and most widely used for everyday communication.

== General reference ==
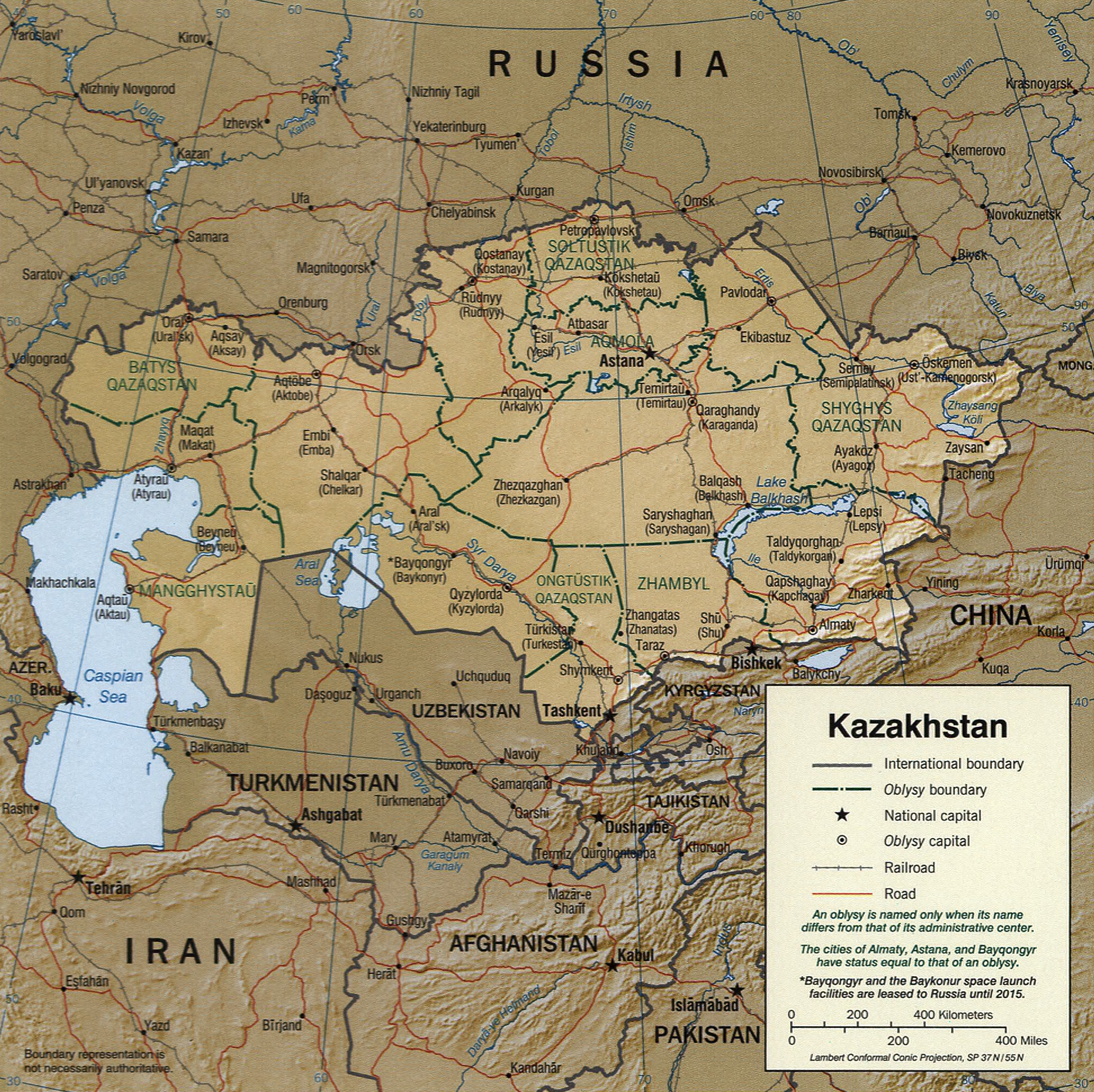
An enlargeable relief map of Kazakhstan

- Pronunciation:
- Common English country name: Kazakhstan
- Official English country name: The Republic of Kazakhstan
- Adjectives: Kazakhstani, Kazakh
- Demonym(s):
- Etymology: Name of Kazakhstan
- International rankings of Kazakhstan
- ISO country codes: KZ, KAZ, 398
- ISO region codes: See ISO 3166-2:KZ
- Internet country code top-level domain: .kz

== Geography of Kazakhstan ==
Geography of Kazakhstan

- Kazakhstan is: a landlocked country
- Location:
  - Kazakhstan is a region or subregion of:
    - Northern Hemisphere and Eastern Hemisphere
      - Eurasia
        - Asia
          - Central Asia
        - Europe
          - Eastern Europe (a small portion only; 381,567 km^{2})
  - Time zone:
    - Kazakhstan Time UTC+5
  - Extreme points of Kazakhstan
    - High: Khan Tengri 7,010 m (22,999 ft)
    - Low: Caspian Depression −132 m (−433 ft)
  - Land boundaries: 12,185 km

Russia 6,846 km
Uzbekistan 2,203 km
China 1,533 km
Kyrgyzstan 1,224 km
Turkmenistan 379 km

- Coastline: none

- Population of Kazakhstan: 20,286,084 – 61st most populous country
- Area of Kazakhstan: 2,724,900 km^{2}
- Atlas of Kazakhstan

=== Environment of Kazakhstan ===
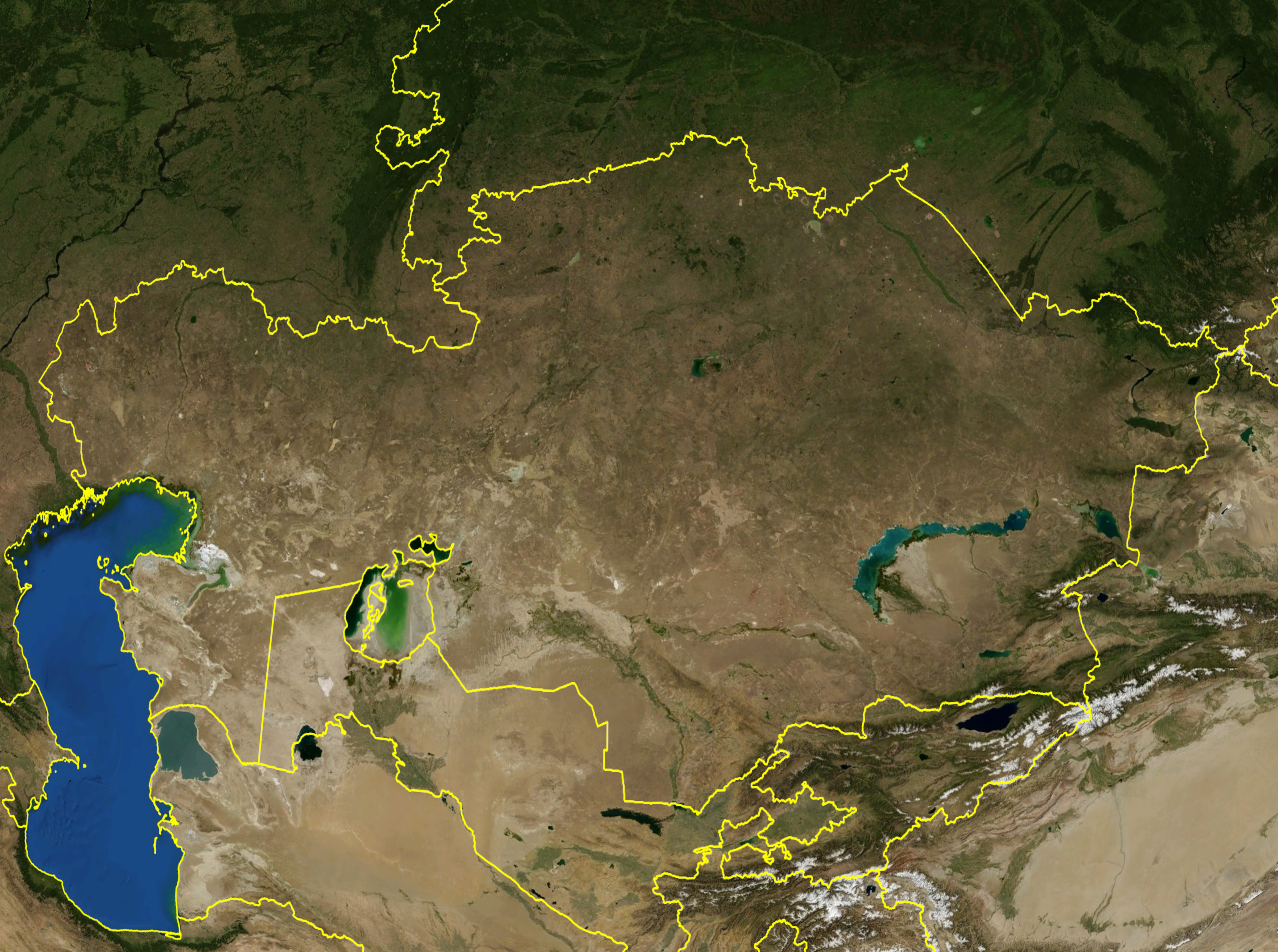
An enlargeable satellite image of Kazakhstan

Environment of Kazakhstan

- Climate of Kazakhstan
- Environmental issues in Kazakhstan
- Renewable energy in Kazakhstan
- Protected areas of Kazakhstan
  - National parks of Kazakhstan
- Wildlife of Kazakhstan
  - Fauna of Kazakhstan
    - Birds of Kazakhstan
    - Mammals of Kazakhstan

==== Natural geographic features of Kazakhstan ====
- Islands of Kazakhstan
- Lakes of Kazakhstan
- Rivers of Kazakhstan
- List of World Heritage Sites in Kazakhstan

=== Regions of Kazakhstan ===
==== Administrative divisions of Kazakhstan ====
Administrative divisions of Kazakhstan

- Regions of Kazakhstan
  - Districts of Kazakhstan

===== Regions of Kazakhstan =====
Regions of Kazakhstan

Region	Status	Full Kazakh name	Time zone
Akmola	region	Ақмола облысы	UTC+5
Aktobe	region	Ақтөбе облысы	UTC+5
Almaty	city^{(1)}	Алматы қаласы	UTC+5
Almaty (region)	region	Алматы облысы	UTC+5
Astana	city^{(1)}	Астана қаласы	UTC+5
Atyrau	region	Атырау облысы	UTC+5
Baikonur	city^{(2)}	Байқоңыр қаласы	UTC+5
East Kazakhstan	region	Шығыс Қазақстан облысы	UTC+5
Karaganda	region	Қарағанды облысы	UTC+5
Kostanay	region	Қостанай облысы	UTC+5
Kyzylorda	region	Қызылорда облысы	UTC+5
Mangystau	region	Маңғыстау облысы	UTC+5
North Kazakhstan	region	Солтүстік Қазақстан облысы	UTC+5
Pavlodar	region	Павлодар облысы	UTC+5
Shymkent	city	Шымкент қаласы	UTC+5
South Kazakhstan	region	Оңтүстік Қазақстан облысы	UTC+5
West Kazakhstan	region	Батыс Қазақстан облысы	UTC+5
Zhambyl	region	Жамбыл облысы	UTC+5

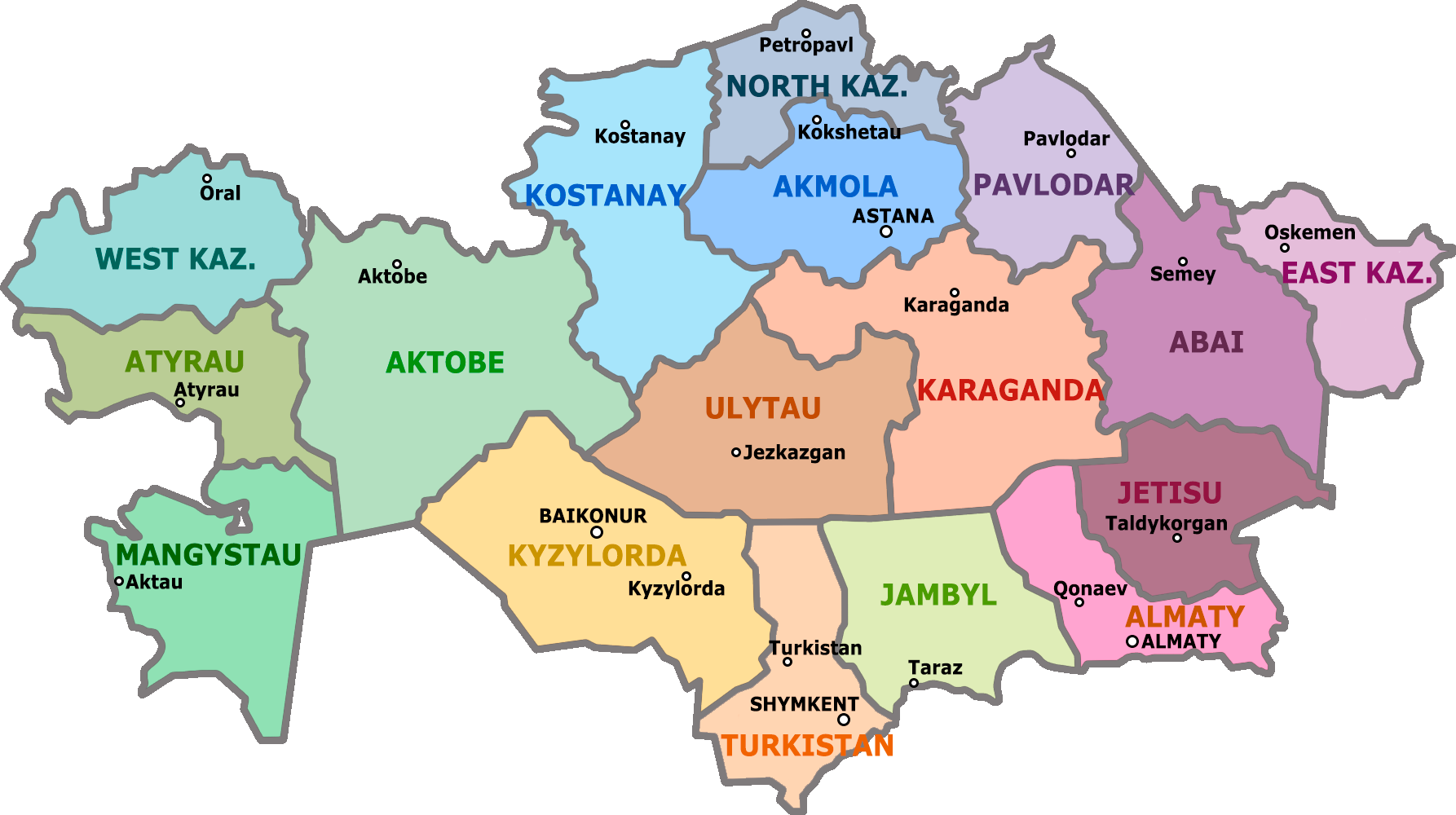
Provinces of Kazakhstan

Notes:

- (1) Almaty, Astana and Shymkent cities have the status of State importance and do not relate to any province.
- (2) Baikonur city has a special status because it is currently being leased to Russia with Baikonur cosmodrome through the year 2050.

===== Districts of Kazakhstan =====
Districts of Kazakhstan

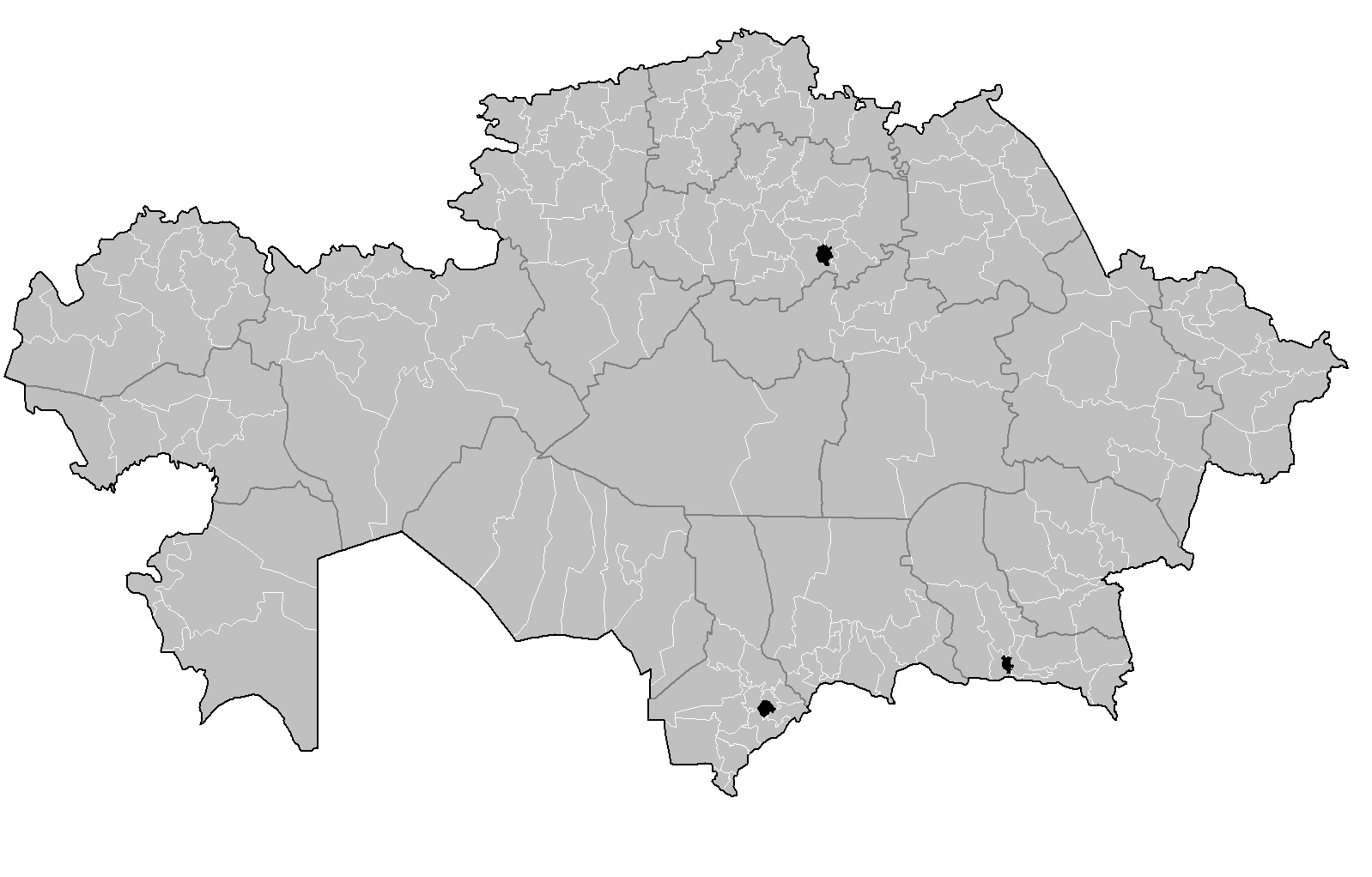

Province	District(s)
Akmola Province	Akkol District; Arshaly District; Astrakhan District; Atbasar District; Birzhan sal District; Bulandy District; Egindikol District; Ereymentau District; Esil District, Akmola Province; Korgalzhyn District; Sandyktau District; Shortandy District; Shuchinsk District; Zerendi District; Zhaksy District; Zharkain District
Aktobe Province	Alga District; Ayteke Bi District; Bayganin District; Kargaly District; Kobda District; Khromtau District; Martuk District; Mugalzhar District; Oiyl District; Shalkar District; Temir District; Yrgyz District
Almaty Province	Aksu District, Almaty Province; Alakol District; Balkhash District; Enbekshikazakh District; Eskeldi District; Ile District, Kazakhstan; Karasay District; Karatal District; Kerbulak District; Koksu District; Panfilov District, Kazakhstan; Raiymbek District; Sarkant District; Talgar District; Uygur District; Zhambyl District, Almaty Province
Atyrau Province	Inder District; Isatay District; Kurmangazy District; Kyzylkoga District; Makat District; Makhambet District; Zhylyoi District
East Kazakhstan Province	Abay District, East Kazakhstan; Ayagoz District; Beskaragay District; Borodulikha District; Glubokoe District; Katonkaragay District; Kokpekti District; Kurshim District; Shemonaikha District; Tarbagatay District; Ulan District; Urzhar District; Zaysan District; Zharma District; Zyryanovsk District
Karagandy Province	Abay District, Karagandy Province; Aktogay District, Karagandy Province; Bukhar-Zhyrau District; Karkaraly District; Nura District; Osakarov District; Shet District; Ulytau District; Zhanaarka District
Kostanay Province	Altynsarin District; Amangeldi District; Auliekol District; Denisov District; Fyodorov District; Kamysty District; Karabalyk District; Karasu District; Kostanay District; Mendykara District; Nauyrzym District; Sarykol District; Taran District; Uzunkol District; Zhangeldi District; Zhetikara District
Kyzylorda Province	Aral District; Karmakshy District; Kazaly District; Shieli District; Syrdariya District; Zhalagash District; Zhanakorgan District
North Kazakhstan	Aiyrtau District; Akkayin District; Akzhar District; Esil District, North Kazakhstan province; Gabit Musirepov District (Tselinniy); Kyzylzhar District; Magzhan Zhumabayev District (Bulaev); Mamlyut District; Shal akyn District (Sergeev); Taiynsha District; Timiryazev District; Ualikhanov District; Zhambyl District, North Kazakhstan Province
Pavlodar Province	Akkuly District; Aktogay District, Pavlodar Province; Bayanaul District; Ertis District; Kashyr District; May District; Pavlodar District; Sharbakty District; Uspen District; Zhelezin District
South Kazakhstan Province	Baydibek District; Kazygurt District; Maktaaral District; Ordabasy District; Otyrar District; Saryagash District; Sayram District; Shardara District; Sozak District; Tole Bi District; Tulkibas District
West Kazakhstan Province	Akzhaik District; Bokey Orda District; Borili District; Karatobe District; Kaztal District; Shyngyrlau District; Syrym District; Taskala District; Terekti District; Zelenov District; Zhanakala District; Zhanybek District
Zhambyl Province	Bayzak District; Korday District; Merke District; Moiynkum District; Sarysu District; Shu District; Talas District; Turar Ryskulov District; Zhambyl District, Zhambyl Province; Zhualy District

===== Municipalities of Kazakhstan =====
Municipalities of Kazakhstan

- Capital of Kazakhstan: Capital of Kazakhstan
- Cities of Kazakhstan

=== Demography of Kazakhstan ===
Demographics of Kazakhstan

== Government and politics of Kazakhstan ==
Politics of Kazakhstan

- Form of government: semi-presidential republic
- Capital of Kazakhstan: Capital of Kazakhstan
- Elections in Kazakhstan
- Political parties in Kazakhstan
- Taxation in Kazakhstan

=== Branches of the government of Kazakhstan ===
Government of Kazakhstan

==== Executive branch of the government of Kazakhstan ====
- Head of state: Kassym-Jomart Tokayev, President of Kazakhstan
- Head of government: Oljas Bektenov, Prime Minister of Kazakhstan

==== Legislative branch of the government of Kazakhstan ====
- Parliament of Kazakhstan (bicameral)
  - Upper house: Senate of Kazakhstan
  - Lower house: Mazhilis

==== Judicial branch of the government of Kazakhstan ====
Court system of Kazakhstan

- Supreme Court of Kazakhstan

=== Foreign relations of Kazakhstan ===
Foreign relations of Kazakhstan

- Diplomatic missions in Kazakhstan
- Diplomatic missions of Kazakhstan

==== International organization membership ====
The Republic of Kazakhstan is a member of:

- Asian Development Bank (ADB)
- Collective Security Treaty Organization (CSTO)
- Commonwealth of Independent States (CIS)
- Economic Cooperation Organization (ECO)
- Eurasian Economic Community (EAEC)
- Euro-Atlantic Partnership Council (EAPC)
- European Bank for Reconstruction and Development (EBRD)
- Food and Agriculture Organization (FAO)
- General Confederation of Trade Unions (GCTU)
- International Atomic Energy Agency (IAEA)
- International Bank for Reconstruction and Development (IBRD)
- International Civil Aviation Organization (ICAO)
- International Criminal Police Organization (Interpol)
- International Development Association (IDA)
- International Federation of Red Cross and Red Crescent Societies (IFRCS)
- International Finance Corporation (IFC)
- International Fund for Agricultural Development (IFAD)
- International Labour Organization (ILO)
- International Maritime Organization (IMO)
- International Monetary Fund (IMF)
- International Olympic Committee (IOC)
- International Organization for Migration (IOM)
- International Organization for Standardization (ISO)
- International Red Cross and Red Crescent Movement (ICRM)
- International Telecommunication Union (ITU)
- International Telecommunications Satellite Organization (ITSO)
- Inter-Parliamentary Union (IPU)
- Islamic Development Bank (IDB)
- Multilateral Investment Guarantee Agency (MIGA)
- Nonaligned Movement (NAM) (observer)
- Nuclear Suppliers Group (NSG)
- Organisation of Islamic Cooperation (OIC)
- Organization for Security and Cooperation in Europe (OSCE)
- Organisation for the Prohibition of Chemical Weapons (OPCW)
- Organization of American States (OAS) (observer)
- Partnership for Peace (PFP)
- Shanghai Cooperation Organisation (SCO)
- United Nations (UN)
- United Nations Conference on Trade and Development (UNCTAD)
- United Nations Educational, Scientific, and Cultural Organization (UNESCO)
- United Nations Industrial Development Organization (UNIDO)
- Universal Postal Union (UPU)
- World Confederation of Labour (WCL)
- World Customs Organization (WCO)
- World Federation of Trade Unions (WFTU)
- World Health Organization (WHO)
- World Intellectual Property Organization (WIPO)
- World Meteorological Organization (WMO)
- World Tourism Organization (UNWTO)
- World Trade Organization (WTO) (observer)

=== Law and order in Kazakhstan ===
Law of Kazakhstan

- Constitution of Kazakhstan
- Human rights in Kazakhstan
  - LGBT rights in Kazakhstan
  - Freedom of religion in Kazakhstan
- Law enforcement in Kazakhstan

=== Military of Kazakhstan ===
Military of Kazakhstan

- Command
  - Commander-in-chief:
- Forces
  - Army of Kazakhstan
  - Navy of Kazakhstan
  - Air Force of Kazakhstan

== History of Kazakhstan ==
History of Kazakhstan

== Culture of Kazakhstan ==
Culture of Kazakhstan

- Cuisine of Kazakhstan
- Languages of Kazakhstan
- Media in Kazakhstan
- National symbols of Kazakhstan
  - Coat of arms of Kazakhstan
  - Flag of Kazakhstan
  - National anthem of Kazakhstan
- People of Kazakhstan
  - Kazakhs
    - Russians in Kazakhstan
    - Ukrainians in Kazakhstan
    - Germans of Kazakhstan
    - Armenians in Kazakhstan
    - Greeks in Kazakhstan
    - Kazakh Jews
- Prostitution in Kazakhstan
- Public holidays in Kazakhstan
- Religion in Kazakhstan
  - Buddhism in Kazakhstan
  - Christianity in Kazakhstan
  - Hinduism in Kazakhstan
  - Islam in Kazakhstan
  - Judaism in Kazakhstan
- List of World Heritage Sites in Kazakhstan

=== Art in Kazakhstan ===
- Cinema of Kazakhstan
- Literature of Kazakhstan
- Music of Kazakhstan
- Television in Kazakhstan

=== Sports in Kazakhstan ===
Sports in Kazakhstan

- Football in Kazakhstan
- Kazakhstan at the Olympics

== Economy and infrastructure of Kazakhstan ==
Economy of Kazakhstan

- Economic rank, by nominal GDP (2007): 55th (fifty-fifth)
- Agriculture in Kazakhstan
- Banking in Kazakhstan
  - National Bank of Kazakhstan
- Communications in Kazakhstan
  - Internet in Kazakhstan
- Companies of Kazakhstan
- Currency of Kazakhstan: Tenge
  - ISO 4217: KZT
- Energy in Kazakhstan
  - Energy policy of Kazakhstan
- Health care in Kazakhstan
- Mining in Kazakhstan
- Kazakhstan Stock Exchange
- Tourism in Kazakhstan
- Transport in Kazakhstan
  - Airports in Kazakhstan
  - Rail transport in Kazakhstan
  - Roads in Kazakhstan

== Education in Kazakhstan ==
Education in Kazakhstan

== Health in Kazakhstan ==
Health in Kazakhstan

== See also ==
Kazakhstan

- List of Kazakhstan-related topics
- List of international rankings
- Member states of the United Nations
- Outline of Asia
- Outline of geography
