= Taldykol (lake) =

Lake in Kazakhstan

- Талдыкөл
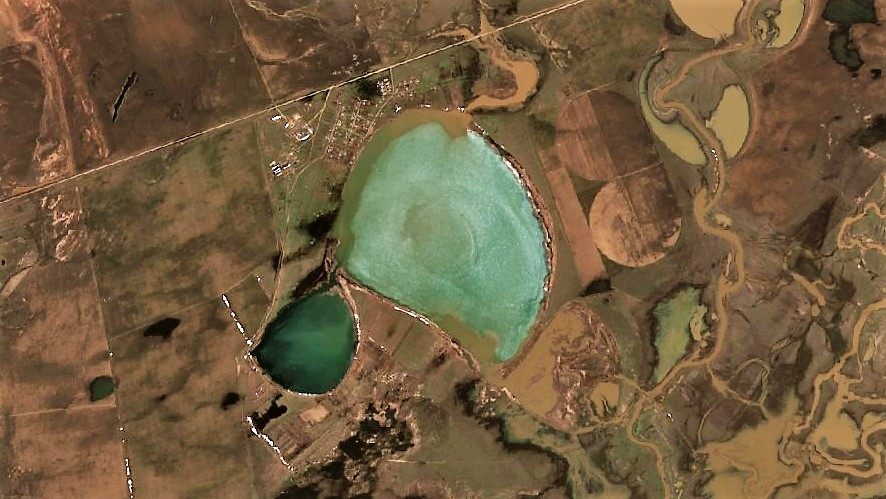
- Sentinel-2 image of the lake during spring floods

- Location within Kazakhstan
- Location: Akmola Region
- Coordinates: 51°42′35″N 70°09′53″E
- Type: fluvial lake
- Primary inflows: Boksyk
- Primary outflows: Boksyk
- Basin countries: Kazakhstan
- Max. length: 4.2 km (2.6 mi)
- Max. width: 2.9 km (1.8 mi)
- Surface area: 9 km^{2} (3.5 sq mi)
- Residence time: UTC+5
- Surface elevation: 198 m (650 ft)
- Islands: no

Taldykol (Kazakh: Талдыкөл) is a lake in Bulandy District, Akmola Region, Kazakhstan.

The lake is located by Vorobyovka village, 87 km (54 mi) to the southwest of Makinsk, the district capital.

== Geography ==
Taldykol is a fluvial lake of the Ishim basin. It is located close to the right bank of the Boksyk river, a tributary of the Kalkutan. To the west there is a lobe joined to the main lake by a sound in the western shore. There is a channel at the southeastern end of the lake connecting with the Boksyk. The channel has a dam that was built in 1953, at the time of the Kazakh SSR, to regulate the water level. The southwestern and northeastern lakeshores are gently sloping, the remainder are steep. The bottom is sandy and silty. The thickness of the silt layer is between 20 cm (7.9 in) and 30 cm (12 in). The lake freezes in November and thaws by April. The water of Taldykol is fresh, becoming brackish in the summer.

Taldykol lies about 40 km (25 mi) to the northeast of the Ishim, of which the Kalkutan is a tributary. Among the lakes in its vicinity, Balyktykol lies 25 kilometers (16 mi) to the southeast, and Alakol 69 kilometers (43 mi) to the south.

== Flora and fauna ==
The shores are lined with reeds. The area surrounding Taldykol includes agricultural fields and patches of steppe vegetation. There are fish living in the lake.

== See also ==
- List of lakes of Kazakhstan
