= Astrakhanka =

Astrakhanka may refer to:

- Astraxanka, Azerbaijan
- Astrakhanka, former name of Cəlilabad, a city in Azerbaijan
- Astrakhanka, Kazakhstan, a town in northern-central Kazakhstan. It is the seat of Astrakhan District in Akmola Province.
- Astrakhanka, name of several rural localities in Russia.
- a person from Astrakhan or Astrakhan Oblast

== See also ==
- Astrakhan (disambiguation)
- Astrakhanovka (disambiguation)
