= Zheltau =

Zheltau (Kazakh: Желтау; "windy mountain") may refer to:

- Zheltau (massif), a mountainous area of the Kazakh Uplands, Kazakhstan
- Zheltau (Jambyl Region), a mountainous area southwest of Lake Balkhash, Kazakhstan
- Zheltau (Akmola Region), a village in Zerendi District, Kazakhstan
- Zheltau (Pavlodar Region), an abandoned village in Bayanaul District, Kazakhstan
- Zheltau (lake), a lake close to Zheltau village, Akmola Region, Kazakhstan
