= Balyktykol (Shortandy District) =

Lake in Kazakhstan

- Балықтыкөл
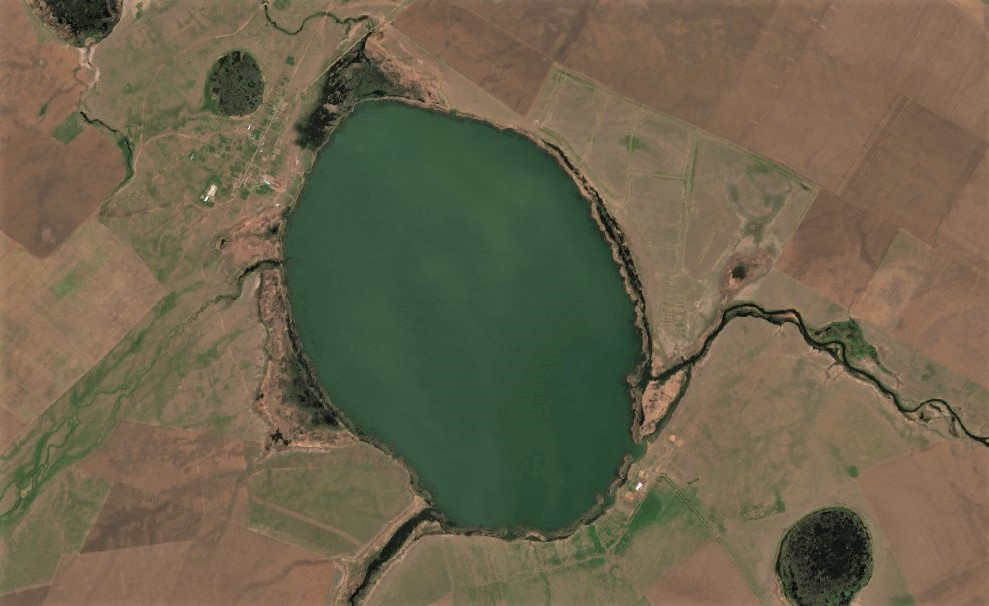
- Sentinel-2 image of the lake

- Location within Kazakhstan
- Location: Akmola Region
- Coordinates: 51°42′35″N 70°09′53″E
- Catchment area: 478 km^{2} (185 sq mi)
- Basin countries: Kazakhstan
- Max. length: 7.9 km (4.9 mi)
- Max. width: 4.9 km (3.0 mi)
- Surface area: 25.4 km^{2} (9.8 sq mi)
- Average depth: 3 m (9.8 ft)
- Water volume: 0.0079 cubic kilometers (0.0019 cu mi)
- Residence time: UTC+6
- Shore length^{1}: 16.1 km (10.0 mi)
- Surface elevation: 301 m (988 ft)
- Islands: no
- ^{1} Shore length is not a well-defined measure.

Balyktykol (Kazakh: Балықтыкөл; Russian: Балыктыколь) is a lake in Shortandy District, Akmola Region, Kazakhstan.

The lake is located 55 km (34 mi) to the west of Shortandy, the district capital. Kamyshenka village lies by the northwestern shore

== Geography ==
Balyktykol is an oval lake located on a slightly hilly plain roughly sloping to the north. Three intermittent watercourses flow into the lake from the west, southwest and the southeast. Approximately every three years —provided there is sufficient precipitation— Balyktykol becomes exorheic and drains through a roughly 12 m (39 ft) wide riverbed at the northern end. Its waters reach the left bank of the Kalkutan river, that flows 6.5 km (4.0 mi) to the north.

The lake lies about 30 km (19 mi) to the northeast of the Ishim, of which the Kalkutan is a tributary. The water of Balyktykol is fresh. The lake freezes in November and thaws by April. The ice thickness reaches between 1.2 m (3 ft 11 in) and 1.3 m (4 ft 3 in) in severe winters, but usually it is 0.8 m (2 ft 7 in) to 1 m (3 ft 3 in) thick in average winters. Among the lakes in its vicinity, Taldykol lies 25 kilometers (16 mi) to the northwest, and Alakol 56 kilometers (35 mi) to the SSW.

== Flora and fauna ==
About two thirds of the catchment area of the lake are agricultural fields, the remaining area has steppe vegetation. There is a continuous 200 m (660 ft) to 300 m (980 ft) wide strip along the lakeshore in which reeds predominate. Further offshore there are submerged aquatic plants covering about 20% of the lake surface. There are fish living in the lake.

== See also ==
- List of lakes of Kazakhstan
