= Zheltau, Akmola Region =

Zheltau Желтау
- Village
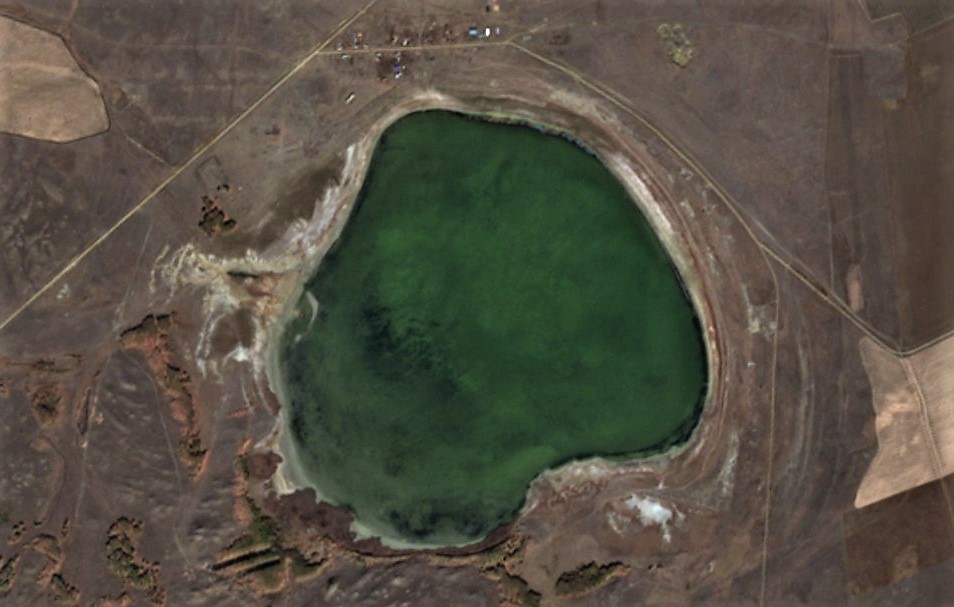
- Zheltau village near the northern lakeshore

- Location in Kazakhstan
- Coordinates: 53°02′26″N 69°31′03″E
- Country: Kazakhstan
- Region: Akmola Region

Population (2009)
  - Total: 75
- Time zone: UTC+6 (ALMT)
- Area code: 7 71632

Zheltau (Kazakh: Желтау), known as Oktyabr until 2010, is a village in Zerendi District, Akmola Region, Kazakhstan. Its KATO code is 115665800. Population: 138 (1999 census results). 75 (2009 census results).

== Geography ==
Zheltau is located 27 kilometers (17 mi) to the northeast of Zerendi, the district center, near the northern shore of lake Zheltau. The center of the rural district is the village of Karaul Konai-biy, located 14 kilometers (8.7 mi) to the south.
