= Pervomayka, Kazakhstan =

Pervomayka Первомайка
- Nickname: Partymayka
- Location within Kazakhstan
- Coordinates: 51°17′13″N 70°07′50″E
- Country: Kazakhstan
- Region: Akmola Region
- District: Astrakhan District
- Established: 1936

Population (2009)
  - Total: 1,388
- Time zone: UTC+6 (UTC+6)
- Postal code: 020320
- Area code: +7 71641

Pervomayka (Kazakh: Первомайка, Pervomaika; Russian: Первомайка) is a village in Astrakhan of Akmola Region, Kazakhstan. It is located on the Ishim River.

== Demographics ==
According to the 2009 Kazakhstan census, the population was 1,388.
