= Kaindy, Akmola Region =

Kaindy Қайынды (Kazakh) Кайынды (Russian)
- Village
- Location in Kazakhstan
- Coordinates: 53°22′55″N 69°43′37″E
- Country: Kazakhstan
- Region: Akmola Region

Population (2009)
  - Total: 40
- Time zone: UTC+6 (ALMT)
- Area code: 7172
- Vehicle registration: C, O, W and 03 (region)

Kaindy (Kazakh: Қайынды), formerly known as Trofimovka (until 2018), is a village (selo) in Zerendi District, Akmola Region, in northern part of Kazakhstan. The KATO code is 115652700.

== Demographics ==
=== Population ===
Population: 41 (1999 census results). (17 males and 24 females). As of 2009, the population of Kaindy was 40 inhabitants (22 males and 18 females).
