= Astrakhanovka =

Astrakhanovka may refer to:

- Astraxanovka, Azerbaijan, a village and municipality in the Oghuz Rayon
- Astrakhanovka, Azerbaijan, a village in the Jalilabad Rayon
- Astrakhanovka, name of several rural localities in Russia

== See also ==
- Astrakhan (disambiguation)
- Astrakhanka (disambiguation)
