= Barshyn =

Lake in Kazakhstan

- Баршын
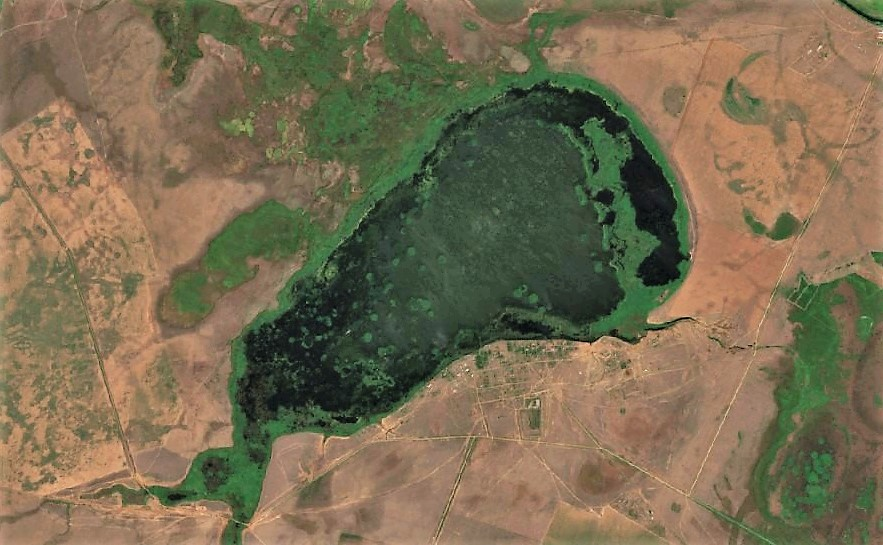
- Sentinel-2 image of the lake

- Location within Kazakhstan
- Location: Akmola Region
- Coordinates: 51°35′17″N 69°13′57″E
- Basin countries: Kazakhstan
- Max. length: 6.5 km (4.0 mi)
- Max. width: 3.9 km (2.4 mi)
- Surface area: 13.1 km^{2} (5.1 sq mi)
- Max. depth: 8 m (26 ft)
- Residence time: UTC+6
- Surface elevation: 280 m (920 ft)

Barshyn (Kazakh: Баршын), also known as Barsen (Kazakh: Барсен), is a lake in Astrakhan District, Akmola Region, Kazakhstan.

The lake is located 35 km (22 mi) to the west of Astrakhanka, the district capital. The now abolished village of Kainarskoye (Kazakh: Қайнарское), part of the Uzynkol Rural District, was located by the southern shore. Three fishermen on a boat were lost in the lake in 2020. After a 3-day long search the bodies of two of them were located, but the body of the third was found only two weeks later.

== Geography ==
Barshyn is a freshwater lake part of the Ishim river basin. It is located about 4 km (2.5 mi) to the southwest of the Ishim river channel. The lake is exorheic; a watercourse flows from the southwestern end and the lake water drains through an intermittent riverbed towards the east.

The water of lake Barshyn is fresh. The lake is relatively deep. It usually freezes at the beginning of November and thaws by the end of April. Lake Uzynkol lies 9 km (5.6 mi) to the southeast and Alakol 47 kilometers (29 mi) in the same direction.

== Flora and fauna ==
The lakeshore is covered with reeds and there is much submerged aquatic vegetation. The reeds are harvested by local people. Fish and birds caught in the lake are important for the economy of nearby villages.

== See also ==
- List of lakes of Kazakhstan
