= 2015 Women's World Draughts Championship match =

Draughts match between Zoja Golubeva and Tamara Tansykkuzhina

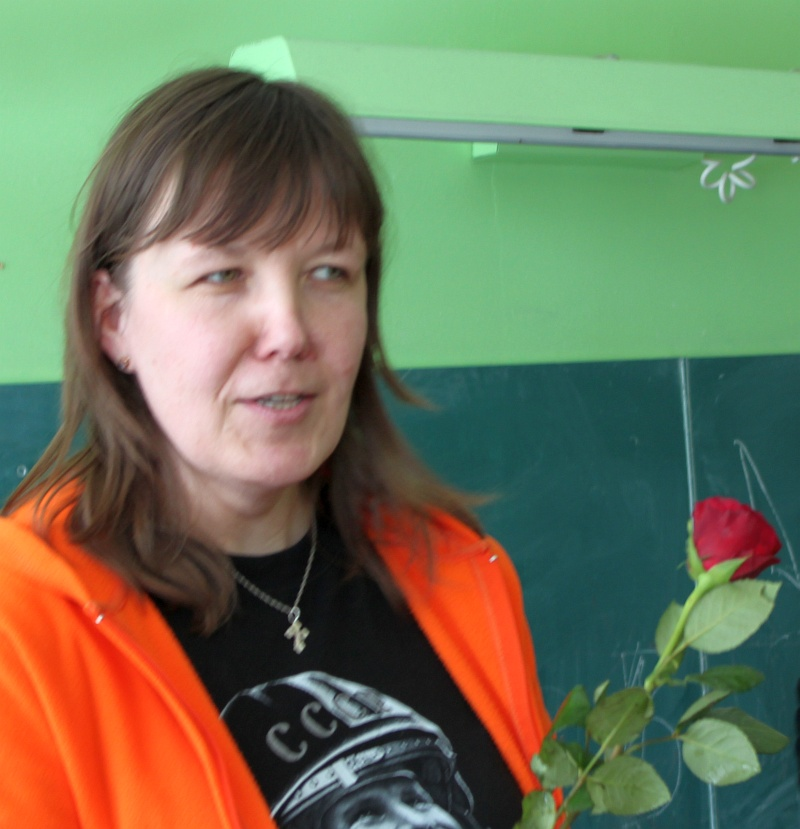
- 2015 Women's World Draughts Champion Zoja Golubeva

Tournament information
- Location: Zerendi, Kazakhstan
- Dates: 1 April–8 April
- Administrator: FMJD
- Tournament format: Match

Final positions
- Champion: Zoja Golubeva

The 2015 Women's World Draughts Championship match in international draughts was held from 1–8 April, 2015 in Zerendi, Kazakhstan. It was held under the auspices of the International Draughts Federation (FMJD) between World Champion Zoja Golubeva (Latvia) and the challenger Tamara Tansykkuzhina (Russia). Zoya Golubeva won with a score of 8:4 and became the world champion for the fifteenth time.

== Rules and regulations ==
The match consisted of seven micro-matches. Each micro-match was played until the first victory. The first game of each micro-match was a standard game: 80 minutes plus a 1-minute increment per move. If the standard game was drawn, a rapid game was played: 20 minutes plus a 5-second increment per move. If the rapid game was drawn, a blitz game was played: 5 minutes plus a 3-second increment per move.

If the blitz game was drawn, the Lehmann–Georgiev tie-break (limited time for an unlimited number of games until the first victory) was used: 5 minutes plus a 2-second increment per move until a decisive result.

The total prize fund was 15,000 euros. From this fund the winner received 8,000 euros, and the loser 7,000.

== Results ==
Round	Name	Country	Classic	Rapid	Blitz	Tie-Break
1	Zoja Golubeva	Latvia	2	—	—	—
1	Tamara Tansykkuzhina	Russia	0	—	—	—
2	Zoja Golubeva	Latvia	1	1	1	0
2	Tamara Tansykkuzhina	Russia	1	1	1	2
3	Zoja Golubeva	Latvia	1	1	2	—
3	Tamara Tansykkuzhina	Russia	1	1	0	—
4	Zoja Golubeva	Latvia	1	1	1	0
4	Tamara Tansykkuzhina	Russia	1	1	1	2
5	Zoja Golubeva	Latvia	1	0	—	—
5	Tamara Tansykkuzhina	Russia	1	2	—	—
6	Zoja Golubeva	Latvia	2	—	—	—
6	Tamara Tansykkuzhina	Russia	0	—	—	—
7	Zoja Golubeva	Latvia				
7	Tamara Tansykkuzhina	Russia				
Total score Zoja Golubeva : Tamara Tansykkuzhina			8:4	3:5	4:2	0:4

== See also ==
- List of women's Draughts World Championship winners
- Women's World Draughts Championship
