= Uzynkol =

Lake in Kazakhstan

- Ұзынкөл
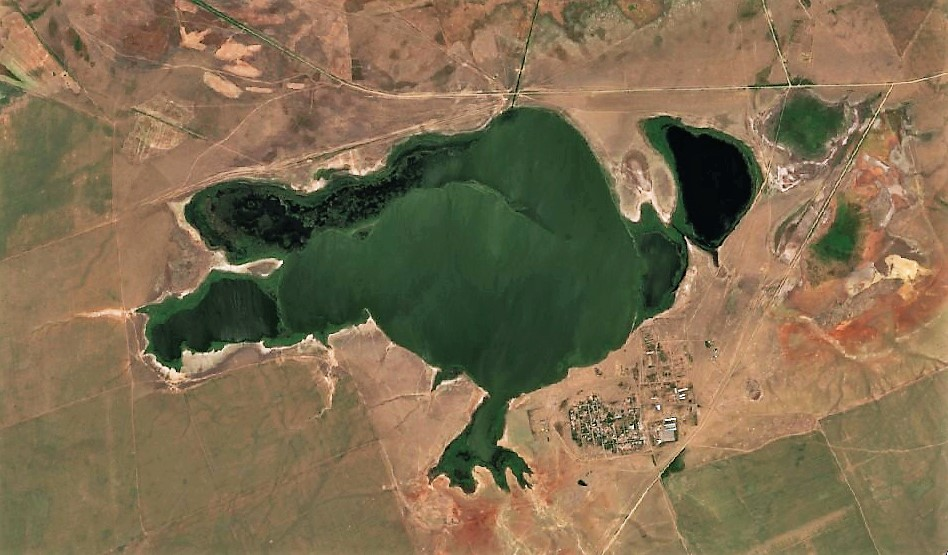
- Sentinel-2 image of the lake

- Location within Kazakhstan
- Location: Akmola Region
- Coordinates: 51°30′52″N 69°21′13″E
- Type: exorheic
- Catchment area: 32.4 km^{2} (12.5 sq mi)
- Basin countries: Kazakhstan
- Max. length: 4.2 km (2.6 mi)
- Max. width: 3.7 km (2.3 mi)
- Surface area: 8 km^{2} (3.1 sq mi)
- Residence time: UTC+5
- Shore length^{1}: 12.4 km (7.7 mi)
- Surface elevation: 284 m (932 ft)
- ^{1} Shore length is not a well-defined measure.

Uzynkol (Kazakh: Ұзынкөл) is a lake in Astrakhan District, Akmola Region, Kazakhstan.

The lake lies by the village of the same name, 24 km (15 mi) to the west of Astrakhanka, the district capital. Tavolzhanka village is located 15 km (9.3 mi) to the northeast.

== Geography ==
Uzykol is part of the Ishim river basin, located about 4 km (2.5 mi) to the south of the Ishim river channel within the floodplain of the river. It is connected with neighboring lake Sabakty by a canal. The lake has a roughly oval shape with an attached bay in the east and another in the west. Often during floods, the Ishim river flows into Uzynkol. The lake shores are low-lying, has a muddy bottom and the water is saline and hard. It usually freezes at the beginning of November and thaws by the end of April.

Lake Sabakty lies 1.7 kilometers (1.1 mi) to the north, Barshyn 8 kilometers (5.0 mi) to the northwest, and Alakol 36 km (22 mi) to the southeast.

== Flora and fauna ==
Reeds and bulrushes grow all along the lakeshore, providing a habitat for waterfowl and waders.

== See also ==
- List of lakes of Kazakhstan
