= Astrakhan (disambiguation) =

Astrakhan is a city in Russia.

Astrakhan or Astrachan may also refer to:

== Places ==
- Astrakhan Oblast, a federal subject of Russia
- Astrakhan Urban Okrug, a municipal formation which the city of oblast significance of Astrakhan in Astrakhan Oblast, Russia is incorporated as
- Astrakhan Khanate, a Tatar feudal state in the 15th-16th centuries
- Astrakhan Governorate (1717–1929), an administrative division of the Russian Empire and the early Russian SFSR
- Astrakhan District, a district of Akmola Province in northern Kazakhstan
- Astrakhan, Kirov Oblast, a rural locality (a village) in Uninsky District of Kirov Oblast, Russia

== Surname ==
Astrakhan or Astrachan, a Jewish surname derived from the city name:

- Dmitry Astrakhan, Russian movie director and producer
- Joshua Astrachan, American movie script writer
- Owen Astrachan, an American computer scientist

=== Fictional characters ===
- Mrs. Astrakhan, a character from the 2006 animated film Happy Feet
- Alan "Red" Astrachan, a character from the 1973 film Magnum Force

== Other ==
- Astrakhan, a Buyan-class corvette of the Russian Navy
- Astrakhan, another name of newborn karakul sheep's pelts, and hats and coats made from these pelts
- "The Astrakhan", a style of fur cap historically and currently worn by elements of the Canadian Forces and some Canadian Police

== See also ==
- Astrakhanka (disambiguation)
- Astrakhanovka (disambiguation)
