= Arshaly (river) =

Arshaly Аршалы
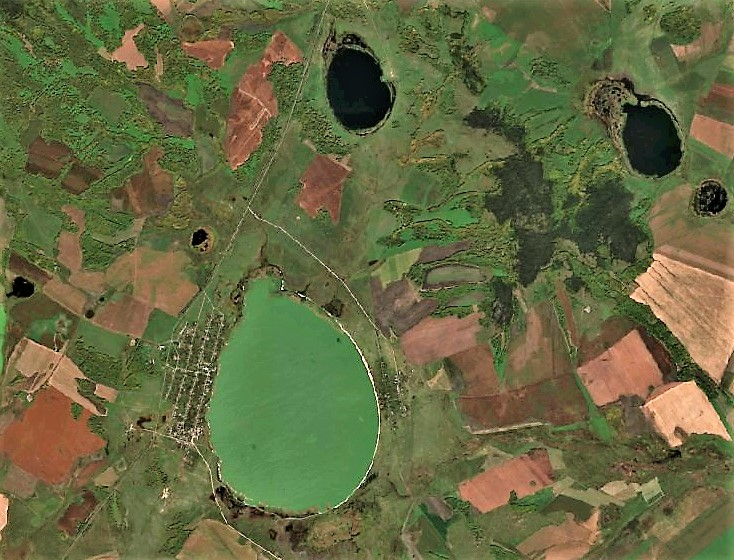
- Upper course of the Arshaly: Lakes Karagaychik (top) and Aydabol (below) Sentinel-2 image.

- Mouth location in Kazakhstan

Location
- Country: Kazakhstan

Physical characteristics
- Source
  - location: Lake Karagaychik; Kokshetau Hills
  - coordinates: 52°48′14″N 69°10′18″E
  - elevation: 435 m (0.270 mi)
- Mouth: Kalkutan
  - coordinates: 51°47′13″N 69°28′12″E
  - elevation: 282 m (0.175 mi)
- Length: 220 km (140 mi) —174 km (108 mi) from Aydabol
- Basin size: 4,160 km^{2} (1,610 sq mi)
- Discharge
  - average: 2.44 m^{3}/s (86 cu ft/s)

Basin features
- Progression: Kalkutan → Ishim→ Irtysh→ Ob→ Kara Sea

The Arshaly (Kazakh: Аршалы; Russian: Аршалы) is a river in Zerendi and Astrakhan districts, Akmola Region, Kazakhstan. It has a length of 220 km (140 mi) and a basin size of 4,160 km^{2} (1,610 sq mi).

The villages of Viktorovka, Nikolayevka, Zhana Kalkutan and Karakol (former Vishnyovka) are located by the banks of river Arshaly. The river is part of the Ishim Water Management Basin.

== Course ==
The Arshaly is a right tributary of the Kalkutan. It has its sources in lake Karagaychik at the southern sector of the Kokshetau Hills. In its uppermost stretch the river flows southwards into lake Aydabol, and then eastwards from the southern shore of the lake. Shortly thereafter it turns southwards and flows roughly in that direction all along its course. After descending into a floodplain, the Arshaly joins the right bank of the Kalkutan near Eski Kalkutan village, a little downstream from the mouth of the Boksyk.

Its main tributaries are the Toktinka and Konyr from the right, and the Kenashy from the left. There are relatively few lakes in its basin.

== See also ==
- List of rivers of Kazakhstan
