= Zhamantuz (lake, Akmola Region) =

Lake in Kazakhstan

- Жамантұз
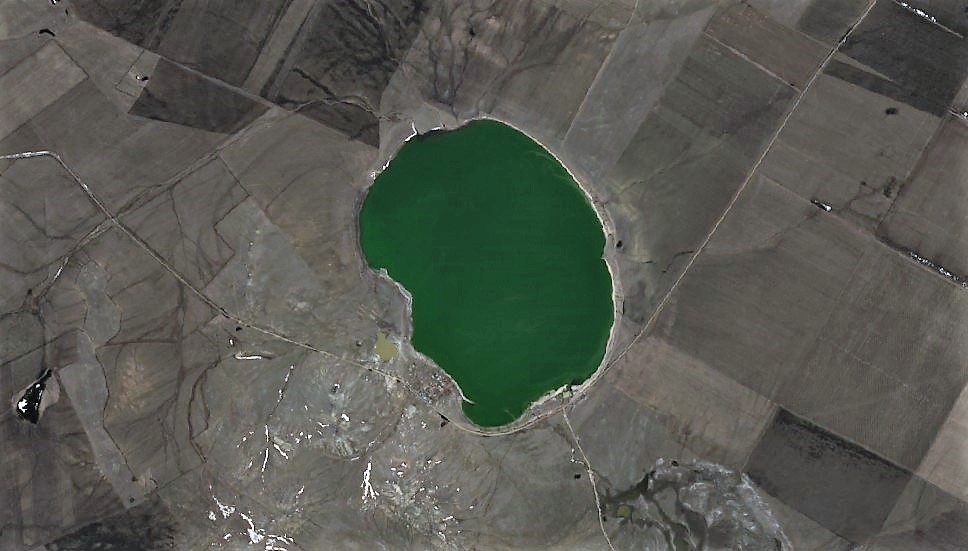
- Sentinel-2 picture of the lake

- Location within Kazakhstan
- Location: Kazakh Uplands
- Coordinates: 53°03′20″N 69°45′36″E
- Type: endorheic lake
- Basin countries: Kazakhstan
- Max. length: 3.6 kilometers (2.2 mi)
- Max. width: 2.7 kilometers (1.7 mi)
- Surface area: 7.2 square kilometers (2.8 sq mi)
- Average depth: 2 meters (6 ft 7 in)
- Residence time: UTC+6:00
- Shore length^{1}: 10.2 kilometers (6.3 mi)
- Surface elevation: 284.7 meters (934 ft)
- Islands: no
- Settlements: Zhamantuz
- ^{1} Shore length is not a well-defined measure.

Zhamantuz (Kazakh: Жамантұз) is a salt lake in the Akmola Region, Kazakhstan.

The lake straddles the Zerendi District in the west and the Burabay District in the east. Zhamantuz village is located by the southwestern lakeshore. The area surrounding lake Zhamantuz is used for agricultural fields and livestock grazing.

== Geography ==
Zhamantuz is an endorheic lake of the northern end of the Kazakh Uplands, part of the Kylshakty river basin. It lies at an elevation of 284.7 meters (934 ft). The Kylshakty flows 15 kilometers (9.3 mi) to the north of the lake.

The lakeshore is flat and sandy. Zhamantuz is replenished by rain and snow. Among the lakes in its vicinity, Kopa lies 35 kilometers (22 mi) to the northwest, Zheltau 13 kilometers (8.1 mi) to the west, Shalkar 20 kilometers (12 mi) to the east, and Karaungir 35 kilometers (22 mi) to the south.

== Flora and fauna ==
Typha and Phragmites reeds grow in parts of the lakeshore. Grasses and Artemisia grow in the area around the lake.

== See also ==
- List of lakes of Kazakhstan
