= Karaungir =

Lake in Kazakhstan

- Қараүңгір
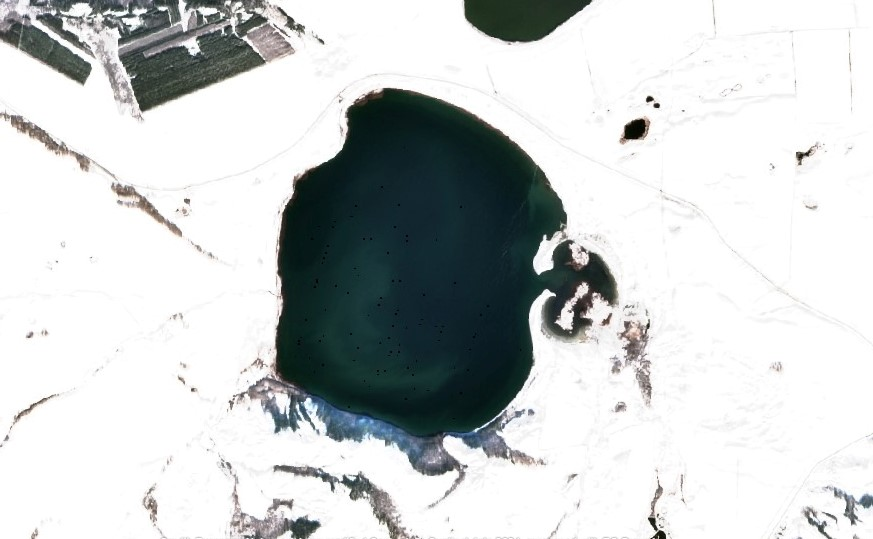
- Sentinel-2 picture of the lake in late October

- Location within Kazakhstan
- Location: Kazakh Uplands
- Coordinates: 52°50′22″N 69°40′59″E
- Type: brackish lake
- Basin countries: Kazakhstan
- Max. length: 4.2 kilometers (2.6 mi)
- Max. width: 3.3 kilometers (2.1 mi)
- Surface area: 10.3 square kilometers (4.0 sq mi)
- Average depth: 1.8 meters (5 ft 11 in)
- Residence time: UTC+5:00
- Surface elevation: 361 meters (1,184 ft)
- Islands: no

Karaungir (Kazakh: Қараүңгір) is a brackish lake in Zerendi and Burabay districts, Akmola Region, Kazakhstan.

The village of Dorogovka lies 4.2 kilometers (2.6 mi) to the west, and Obaly (until 2019 — Pervomayskoye) 4.5 kilometers (2.8 mi) to the south. There is a leisure center on the southeastern lakeshore.

== Geography ==
Karaungir is located in the Kokshetau Mountains, Kazakh Uplands, and is part of the Irtysh basin. It lies at an elevation of 361 meters (1,184 ft). The lake has a roughly rectangular shape oriented in a north–south direction. There is a bay in the eastern shore enclosed by two landspits. The shores are surrounded by elevated terrain and they are regular and gently sloping.

Among the lakes in Karaungir's vicinity, Kumdykol lies 11 kilometers (6.8 mi) to the east, Zhamantuz 20 kilometers (12 mi) to the north, Urymkay 26 kilometers (16 mi) to the southeast, Zerendi 35 kilometers (22 mi) to the WNW, and Aydabol 33 kilometers (21 mi) to the WSW.

== Flora and fauna ==
Karaungir is surrounded by mountain steppe vegetation and patches of forest. The water is slightly saline, but it can be used for watering cattle in the spring after the melting of the snow. The salinity increases in the summer, especially in years of drought.

== See also ==
- Kokshetau Lakes
- List of lakes of Kazakhstan
