= Alakol (Astrakhan District) =

Lake in Kazakhstan

- Алакөл
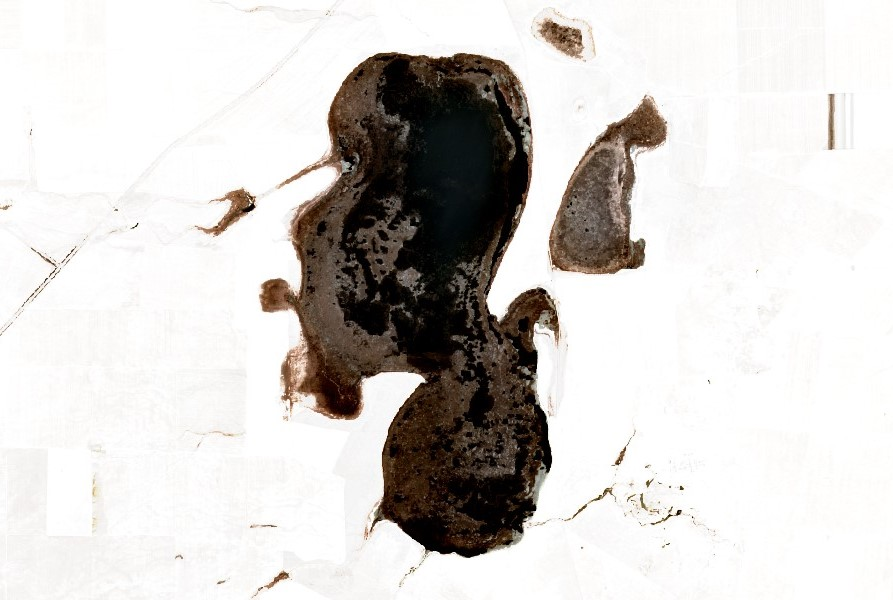
- Sentinel-2 image of Alakol in November with lake Aupeldek in the upper right

- Location within Kazakhstan
- Location: Akmola Region
- Coordinates: 51°12′08″N 69°42′05″E
- Type: endorheic
- Catchment area: 1,240 km^{2} (480 sq mi)
- Basin countries: Kazakhstan
- Max. length: 12.2 km (7.6 mi)
- Max. width: 4.5 km (2.8 mi)
- Surface area: 26.3 km^{2} (10.2 sq mi)
- Max. depth: 3 m (9.8 ft)
- Water volume: 0.0123 cubic kilometers (0.0030 cu mi)
- Residence time: UTC+5
- Shore length^{1}: 35.8 km (22.2 mi)
- Surface elevation: 311 m (1,020 ft)
- ^{1} Shore length is not a well-defined measure.

Alakol (Kazakh: Алакөл) is a lake in Astrakhan District, Akmola Region, Kazakhstan.

The lake is located 28 km (17 mi) to the south of Astrakhanka, the district capital. Stepnoye village is located 8 km (5.0 mi) to the west and Korkem 8 km (5.0 mi) to the southeast in Egindikol District; the border of the district runs along the southeastern shore.

== Geography ==
Alakol is part of the Ishim river basin. It is located about 19 km (12 mi) to the southwest of the Ishim river channel. The lake has roughly an hourglass shape oriented from north to south. There are sections where the lake is lined by steep cliff-like banks, reaching 4 m (13 ft) to 5 m (16 ft) in height. Alakol is filled with snow and groundwater. In years of drought it may dry significantly and turn into a sor. The lake usually freezes at the beginning of November and thaws by the end of April.

Lake Aupeldek is located close to the northern section of the eastern lakeshore, separated from Alakol by an 800 m (2,600 ft) wide strip of land, Uzynkol lies 36 km (22 mi) to the northwest and Barshyn 47 kilometers (29 mi) in the same direction, lake Kozhakol is located 38 kilometers (24 mi) to the southeast.

== Flora and fauna ==
Reeds grow on most stretches of the lakeshore.

== See also ==
- List of lakes of Kazakhstan
