= Boksyk =

Boksyk Боқсық
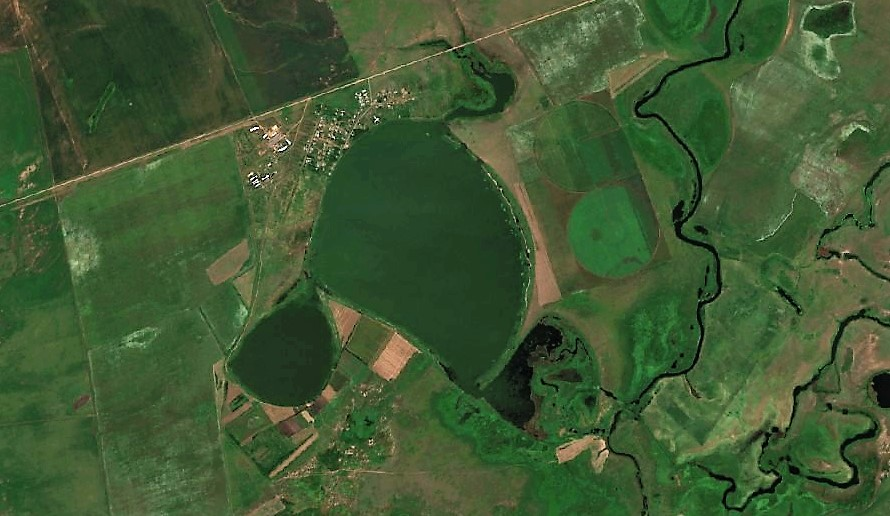
- The Boksyk (right) flowing near Taldykol lake

- Mouth location in Kazakhstan

Location
- Country: Kazakhstan

Physical characteristics
- Source
  - location: Kokshetau Hills
  - coordinates: 52°43′30″N 70°17′40″E
  - elevation: 470 m (0.29 mi)
- Mouth: Kalkutan
  - coordinates: 51°47′14″N 69°36′17″E
  - elevation: 284 m (0.176 mi)
- Length: 171 km (106 mi)
- Basin size: 4,930 km^{2} (1,900 sq mi)
- Discharge
  - average: 1.95 m^{3}/s (69 cu ft/s)

Basin features
- Progression: Kalkutan → Ishim→ Irtysh→ Ob→ Kara Sea

The Boksyk (Kazakh: Боқсық) or Baksuk (Russian: Баксук) is a river in Bulandy and Astrakhan districts, Akmola Region, Kazakhstan. It has a length of 171 km (106 mi) and a basin size of 4,930 km^{2} (1,900 sq mi). There are several dams on the river. The water is used for watering cattle and land irrigation.

== Course ==
The Boksyk is a right tributary of the Kalkutan. It has its sources in the southern sector of the Kokshetau Hills. The river is known as Kairakty in its upper reaches, down to Kapitonovka village. It flows in a roughly SSW direction all along its course and joins the right bank of the Kalkutan a little upstream from the mouth of the Arshaly, near Yagodnoye. There are a number of lakes in the Boksyk basin, the largest of which is Taldykol, by Vorobyovka.

Its main tributaries are the Zholboldy, Mat, and Kurgak.

== See also ==
- List of rivers of Kazakhstan
- Taldykol (lake)
