= Shortandy District =

Coordinates: 51°43′48″N 70°58′48″E

Shortandy
- District
- Şоrtаndy аudany
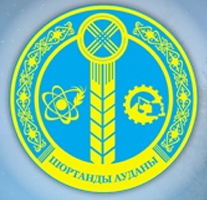
- Coat of arms

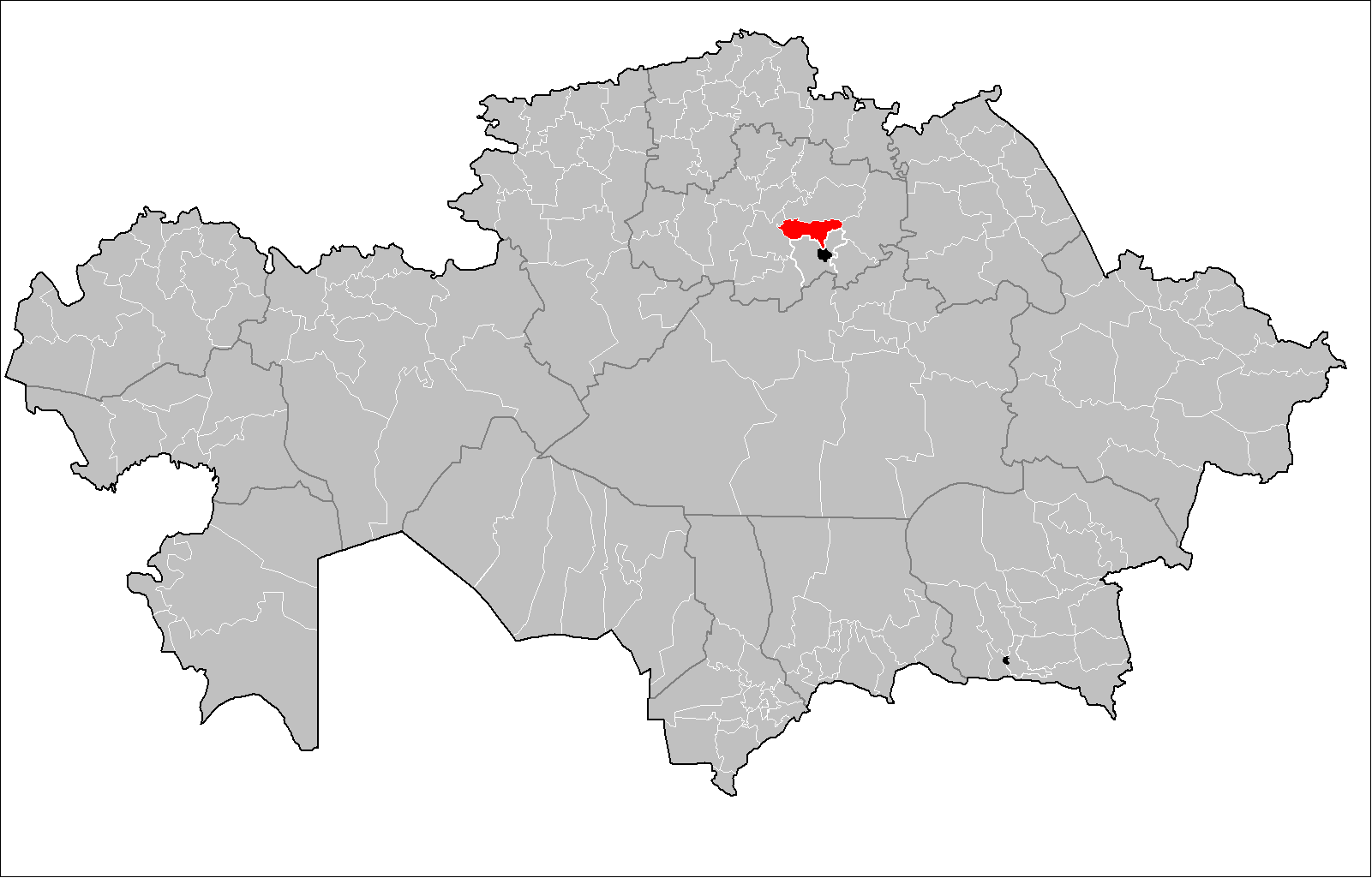
- Country: Kazakhstan
- Region: Aqmola Region
- Administrative center: Shortandy
- Founded: 1944

Government
  - Akim: Shabarov Sagyndyk Serikbayevich

Area
  - Total: 1,800 sq mi (4,700 km^{2})

Population (2013)
  - Total: 29,538
- Time zone: UTC+6 (East)

Shortandy District (Kazakh: Шортанды ауданы, Şortandy audany) is a district of Aqmola Region in northern Kazakhstan. The administrative center of the district is the settlement of Shortandy. Population: 29,538 (2009 census results); 33,074 (1999 census results).

== Geography ==
The Ishim river and its tributary Kalkutan flow across Shortandy District. Lake Balyktykol is located in the district.
