= Aydabol =

Lake in Kazakhstan

- Айдабол
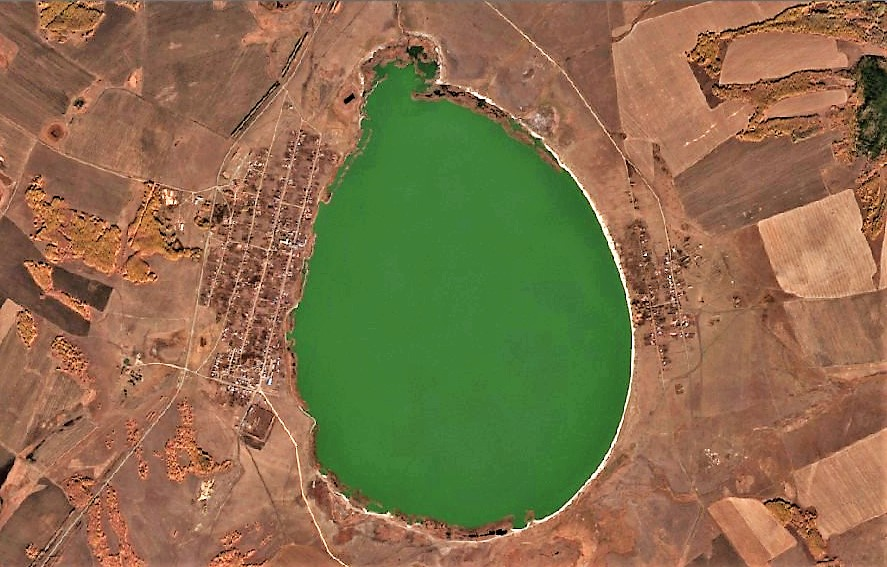
- Sentinel-2 picture of the lake in mid October

- Location within Kazakhstan
- Location: Kazakh Uplands
- Coordinates: 52°44′59″N 69°08′56″E
- Type: exorheic lake
- Primary inflows: Arshaly
- Primary outflows: Arshaly
- Basin countries: Kazakhstan
- Max. length: 5.7 kilometers (3.5 mi)
- Max. width: 3.9 kilometers (2.4 mi)
- Surface area: 15.3 square kilometers (5.9 sq mi)
- Max. depth: 3 meters (9.8 ft)
- Residence time: UTC+5:00
- Surface elevation: 427 meters (1,401 ft)
- Islands: no

Aydabol (Kazakh: Айдабол) is a lake in Zerendi and Burabay districts, Akmola Region, Kazakhstan.

The village of Viktorovka lies by the western lakeshore, and Bogenbay Bi (until 2007 — Losevka) by the eastern. The Kokshetau - Atbasar highway passes close to the western lakeside. There are archaeological sites of the Bronze and Iron Ages in the area near the lake.

== Geography ==
Aydabol is located in the Kokshetau Mountains, Kazakh Uplands, and is part of the Irtysh basin. It lies at an elevation of 427 meters (1,401 ft). The lake has a drop shape oriented in a north–south direction. The Arshaly river flows from lake Karagaychik in the north into the northeastern shore. A tributary of the Zhabay flows southwestwards from the western shore. The Arshaly flows out from the southeastern shore.

Among the lakes in Aydabol's vicinity, Karagaychik lies 5 kilometers (3.1 mi) to the NNE, Zerendi 15 kilometers (9.3 mi) to the north, Kumdykol 24 kilometers (15 mi) to the west, and Karaungir 33 kilometers (21 mi) to the ENE.

== Flora and fauna ==
Aydabol is surrounded by mountain steppe vegetation and patches of forest. Reeds grow on the shore. The water is fresh and is used for agricultural purposes.

== See also ==
- Kokshetau Lakes
- List of lakes of Kazakhstan
