= Egindikol =

Egindikol Егіндікөл
- Village
- Location within Kazakhstan
- Coordinates: 50°50′35″N 70°49′33″E
- Country: Kazakhstan
- Region: West Kazakhstan Region
- District: Egindikol District

Population (2009)
  - Total: 3,285
- Time zone: UTC+5 (UTC + 5)

Egindikol (Kazakh: Егіндікөл, Egındıköl; Russian: Егиндыколь) is a village in northern-central Kazakhstan. It is the administrative center of Egindikol District in Akmola Region. Population: 3,522 (2009 census results);3,285 (1999 census results).
