= Yeni Qızmeydan =

- Location within Azerbaijan
- Coordinates: 40°47′10″N 48°42′25″E
- Country: Azerbaijan
- Rayon: Shamakhi
- Time zone: UTC+4 (AZT)
  - Summer (DST): UTC+5 (AZT)

Yeni Qızmeydan (known as Novoastraxanka until 1999) is a village in the municipality of Qızmeydan in the Shamakhi Rayon of Azerbaijan. In 2014, it was listed as an abandoned village. The village lies West of the Caspian Sea near the river Gozlulchay.
