= Zheltau (lake) =

- Желтау
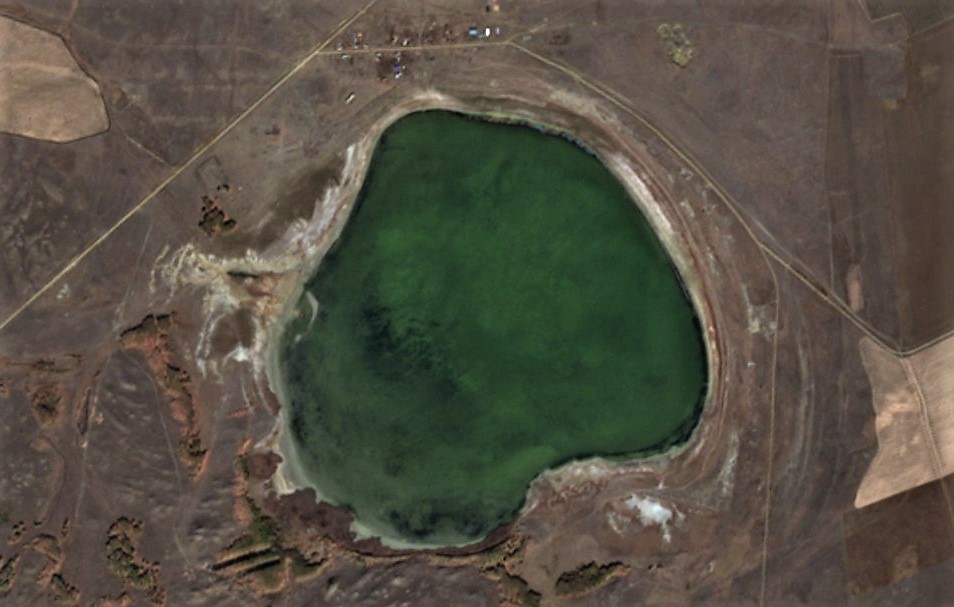
- Sentinel-2 image of the lake

- Location within Kazakhstan
- Location: Kazakh Uplands
- Coordinates: 53°01′36″N 69°31′31″E
- Type: Salt lake
- Basin countries: Kazakhstan
- Max. length: 2.5 kilometers (1.6 mi)
- Max. width: 2.4 kilometers (1.5 mi)
- Surface area: 4.99 square kilometers (1.93 sq mi)
- Max. depth: 3 meters (9.8 ft)
- Residence time: UTC+6
- Shore length^{1}: 8.1 kilometers (5.0 mi)
- Surface elevation: 340 meters (1,120 ft)
- Islands: none
- Settlements: Zheltau
- ^{1} Shore length is not a well-defined measure.

Zheltau (Kazakh: Желтау) is a salt lake in Zerendi District, Akmola Region, Kazakhstan.

The lake lies 28 kilometers (17 mi) to the SSE of the town of Kokshetau.

== Geography ==
Zheltau lies in a tectonic depression of the Kazakh Uplands nearly 50 kilometers (31 mi) to the west of the Kokshetau Hills, 13 kilometers (8.1 mi) to the west of lake Zhamantuz and 26 kilometers (16 mi) to the ENE of lake Zerendi. Zheltau village, former Oktyabr, is located to the north, close to the northern lakeshore.

== See also ==
- List of lakes of Kazakhstan
