= Kozhakol =

Lake in Kazakhstan

- Қожакөл
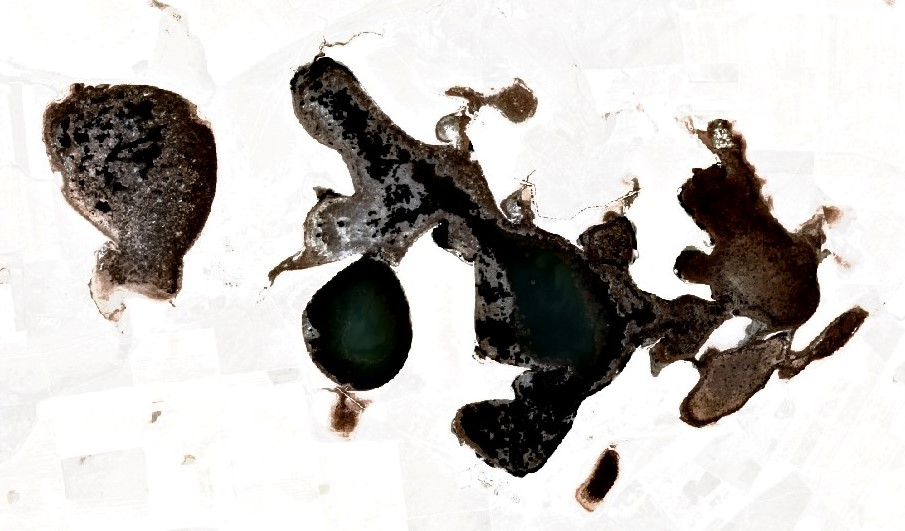
- Lakes Zhalmankulak (left) and Kozhakol Sentinel-2 image

- Location within Kazakhstan
- Location: Nura basin
- Coordinates: 50°55′49″N 69°10′34″E
- Type: endorheic
- Basin countries: Kazakhstan
- Max. length: 16 kilometers (9.9 mi)
- Max. width: 7 kilometers (4.3 mi)
- Surface area: 60 square kilometers (23 sq mi)
- Average depth: 2 meters (6 ft 7 in)
- Max. depth: 3 meters (9.8 ft)
- Residence time: UTC+6
- Surface elevation: 336 meters (1,102 ft)
- Settlements: Zhalmankulak

Kozhakol (Kazakh: Қожакөл; Russian: Кожаколь) is a salt lake in Korgalzhyn District, Akmola Region, Kazakhstan.

Kozhakol lies in the southern sector of Korgalzhyn District. Zhalmankulak village is located close to the western lakeshore.

== Geography ==
Kozhakol is an endorheic lake of the Nura basin that lies at 336 meters (1,102 ft) above sea level. It is located 20 kilometers (12 mi) to the north of the northern shore of Lake Tengiz. Lake Zhalmankulak lies only 2 kilometers (1.2 mi) to the west of the western lakeshore and Alakol 38 kilometers (24 mi) to the northeast.

The shores are deeply indented, forming a compact shape during floods and a cluster of almost separate lakes in times of drought. The eastern lakeshore is steep and rocky, between 2 meters (6 ft 7 in) and 3 meters (9.8 ft) high. The western, southern and northern shorelines are flat. There are agricultural fields in the area around the lake, as well as pasture zones for local cattle. The water of the lake is salty and bitter.

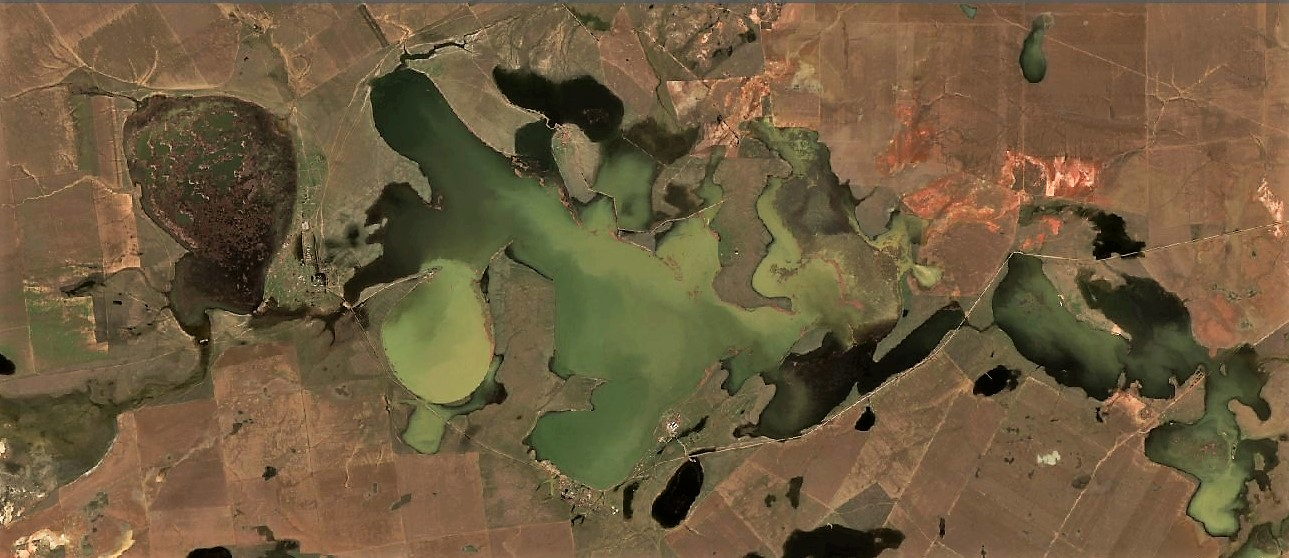
The lakes during the 2024 spring floods Sentinel-2 image.

== See also ==
- List of lakes of Kazakhstan
