= Zerendi (lake) =

Lake Zerendi
- Зеренді
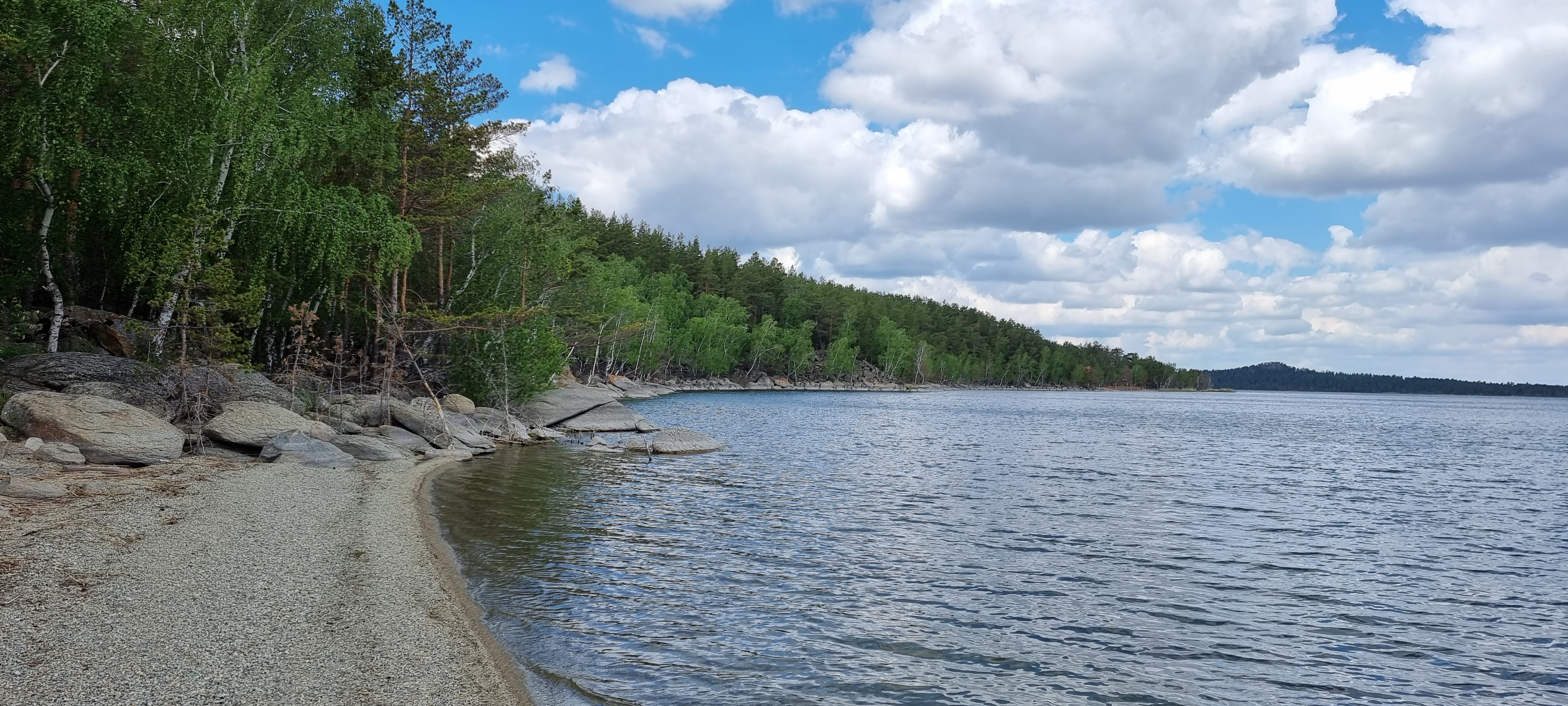

- Location within Kazakhstan
- Location: Kazakhstan
- Coordinates: 52.924120°N 69.113264°E
- Type: Steppe lake
- Part of: Kokshetau Lakes
- Basin countries: Kazakhstan
- Max. length: 6.1 kilometres (3.8 mi)
- Max. width: 3.8 kilometres (2.4 mi)
- Surface area: 11.9 square kilometres (4.6 sq mi)
- Max. depth: 4.8 metres (16 ft)

Lake Zerendi (Kazakh: Зеренді, Zerendı) is a small lake in Zerendi District, Akmola Region, Kazakhstan.

Located just west of Zerendi village, the picturesque lake is a tourist attraction.

== Geography ==
Lake Zerendi is located in the Kokshetau Hills, northern-central Kazakh Uplands. It is surrounded by small mountains covered with forest. Among the lakes in its vicinity, Kumdykol lies 18 kilometers (11 mi) to the north, Aydabol 15 kilometers (9.3 mi) to the south, Karaungir 35 kilometers (22 mi) to the ESE, and Imantau 49 kilometers (30 mi) to the west.

== See also ==
- Kokshetau National Park
