= Qızmeydan =

- Location within Azerbaijan
- Coordinates: 40°46′11″N 48°44′52″E
- Country: Azerbaijan
- Rayon: Shamakhi

Population
  - Total: 1,096
- Time zone: UTC+4 (AZT)
  - Summer (DST): UTC+5 (AZT)

Qızmeydan (known as Astraxanka until 1999) is a village and municipality in the Shamakhi Rayon of Azerbaijan. It has a population of 1,096. The municipality consists of the villages of Qızmeydan and Yeni Qızmeydan.
