= Environmental issues in Kazakhstan =

Environmental issues in Kazakhstan include energy pollution, water issues, land degradation, and radiation. Many of these issues are rooted in Kazakhstan's history in the Soviet Union. Water issues, especially regarding the Aral Sea, originated from the Soviet Union diverting water from tributaries, starting a series of changes in volume and salinity. Nuclear testing by both the Soviet Union and China has contributed to high radiation pollution.

Due to growing concern over these issues, many initiatives and research studies have been dedicated to understanding causes and consequences. One such organizing body, the Council on Environmental Protection, was formed in 2018 and has begun implementing emission standards. There have been increased studies examining thyroid cancer incidence and the link to radiation exposure in Kazakhstan.

== Fossil fuel production ==
The effects of fossil fuel production in Kazakhstan are largely characterized by CO2 emissions from energy production. As of 2011, roughly 80% of all heating and electricity in Kazakhstan is generated from coal-fired power plants, resulting in roughly 60% of all CO2 emissions in Kazakhstan. From 1990 to the present day, the CO2 emissions from coal production have increased due to a decrease in the use of oil and natural gas as fuel sources. While the use of oil and natural gas has decreased, overall use of fossil fuels has increased in recent decades.

Kazakhstan holds 1% of the global natural gas reserves, totalling to 45.7 trillion cubic feet. Additionally, Kazakhstan's economy relies heavily on exporting energy, with oil exports composing 25% of the country's GDP in 2013. As of 2017, Kazakhstan's oil reserves sit at 30 billion barrels and oil production continues to increase with projects instituted by President Nazarbayev and his administration. These projects rely heavily on the three largest oil fields in the country: Tengiz, Karachaganak, and Kashagan. Both Tengiz and Karachaganak exist on land and Kashagan is in the North Caspian Sea. The Eurasia Project plans to continue the search for more oil reserves, but it is unlikely any will prove to be as large as the aforementioned three. With more oil transport pipes being added in Kazakhstan, it is unlikely that oil production will cease in the near future.

=== Council on Environmental Protection ===
In 2018, the Council on Environmental Protection was formed, composed of environmentalists, industry members, governmental, and non-governmental organizations. The Council was created in response to rising public concerns about environmental issues in the Karaganda region, specifically the air quality and concentration of common air pollutants. The purpose of the Council is to monitor and decide how to control environmental harm, imposing strict emissions standards in the transportation and industry sectors. Efforts to enforce emissions standards via regulation and policy have largely been ignored by industry giants in the region, specifically energy production and utility organizations.

== Nuclear testing ==
The Soviet Union conducted 465 nuclear tests in the Semipalatinsk region of Kazakhstan. China's nuclear tests in the Tarim Basin have also produced radioactive dust in the region. Semipalatinsk is the most polluted former Soviet test site.

Semipalatinsk's soil, vegetation, and bodies of water are contaminated with large amounts of radioactive isotopes. Consequently, if people visit this region daily, specifically the areas of Ground Zero and Lake Balapan, they would experience 5 times the worldwide average annual dose of radiation (visitors would experience 10 mSv versus the worldwide average of 2.4 mSv). This exposure to radionuclides is among the most important risk factors of thyroid cancer. Exposure to radiation at an early age is a serious risk factor of thyroid cancer.

Thyroid cancer incidence has been gradually increasing in Kazakhstan. However, East Kazakhstan, including Semipalatinsk, has experienced especially significant fluctuations and peaks of thyroid cancer incidence. This divergence from the general indicators across Kazakhstan suggests the presence of regional characteristics that greatly influence thyroid cancer incidence.

== Land degradation ==
Kazakhstan is facing a land degradation crisis, as year after year, more land becomes unsuitable for agriculture and succumbs to desertification. This issue is extremely pressing, as Kazakhstan finds itself as the Central Asian nation with the largest area currently undergoing the process of desertification. It has over twenty million hectares of land that have suffered so greatly from erosion that their fertility has been severely diminished. Furthermore, there are many times this amount of land at great risk of desertification. Beyond desertification, Kazakhstan also greatly suffers from an overabundance of pesticides and fertilizers in its soil, as farmers rely on them when cultivating their crops. Overgrazing by large cattle herds has led to the degradation of pasturelands across the nation.

In light of the current land degradation crisis in Kazakhstan, the government has begun taking steps to attempt to remedy the situation. It has begun implementing drought-resistant technology and more sustainable agricultural practices in the pursuit of rehabilitating its eroded land. On top of this, the government has further conducted studies of land contaminated by the overuse of pesticides and has conducted experiments to determine viable methods of rehabilitating this land. On top of these efforts, the government has also introduced legislation with the aim of curbing the overuse of pesticides by increasing legal penalties for landowners who cause pollution.

== Water issues ==
Increased levels of urbanization in Kazakhstan after the collapse of the Soviet Union have resulted in strain on water resources, resulting in excess contaminated wastewater overloading treatment facilities. This excess is then discharged into pre-existing water basins and reservoirs. An example of such a strain can be seen at Lake Balkhash, the largest lake entirely in Kazakhstan and home to a variety of industrial services and operations. These industrial operations have resulted in severe heavy and toxic metal pollution in the form of sediments found along the lake bed. The high concentrations of heavy metals have raised concerns from the Kazakh scientific community about the ecological health of the surrounding ecosystems, specifically for aquatic life.

In addition to safety plans regarding pollution into Lake Balkhash, the Kazakh government established policies in order to ensure that water resources were a matter of national security in 2012, focusing on sustainable management of water content to avoid the same mismanagement of the Aral Sea by the Soviet Union. In 2015, the Kazakhmys Corporation announced plans to use environmentally friendly tactics to reduce the emissions that were produced from the industrial processes surrounding Lake Balkhash, as well as heavy metal pollutant discharges into the lake.

Major rivers in Kazakhstan have shown significant decreases in water flow in the last two decades. From 2005 to 2012, the flow rate of the Ili River decreased from 1180 cubic meters per second to 236 cubic meters per second. The Ili is responsible for roughly 80% of the annual replenishment of Lake Balkhash, and its continually decreasing flow rates contribute to the diminishing levels of the lake. As of 2016, Kazakhstan relies on just under half (44.7 km^{3} / year out of 100.6 km^{3} / year) of its water supply from neighboring countries, including China, Uzbekistan, Kyrgyzstan, and Russia. A 2015 World Resources Institute study estimated Kazakhstan to be among the countries with the highest water load and water stress in the world, due to increases in agricultural and energy production with decreases in available water supply.

Lack of modern water purification and distribution systems limits the available useful water supply in Kazakhstan. Loss of water consistently occurs during transportation to rural and agricultural sectors, due to Soviet era equipment that is difficult to service and maintain properly, resulting in nearly 16% loss of total water volume during distribution. Roughly 61% of total freshwater use in the country is dedicated to agricultural services, with the other 41% split between public and industry use.

=== Degradation of the Aral Sea ===
The Aral Sea was once a single large saline lake, surrounded by what is now Kazakhstan and Uzbekistan. Starting in the early 20th century, the Aral Sea was entirely within the borders of the Soviet Union, where hundreds of thousands of people relied on it to sustain the agriculture and fishing industries. However, in the latter half of the 20th century, the Soviet Union began to divert a large volume of water from tributaries to water-intensive agriculture. Over decades, this policy led to more water leaving the Aral Sea than could enter through the feed rivers. By the end of the last decades of the 20th century, the Aral Sea's total volume had greatly decreased, and its salinity significantly increased. The resultant hypersalinity levels led to a reduction in many of the fish species that the fishing industry relied on, and the decreased water levels led to fragmentation of the sea into distinct bodies of water. The northernmost of these has been named the North Aral Sea, and it is the most ecologically viable as it has been the target of strong conservation efforts by both the World Bank and the government of Kazakhstan. While the north has experienced partial ecological recovery, the separate bodies of water in the southern Aral Sea are isolated, shrinking, and unsuitable habitats for the vast majority of aquatic life.

The Aral Sea now covers a small fraction of the surface area it previously did prior to its desiccation. As its waterline receded, it left a vast desert of salt plains, which has led to millions of tons of dust and salt being dumped over crops and people. Air pollution increased due to increases in the quantity of fine particles kicked up into the air due to the recession of the Aral Sea's waterline. While this has raised health concerns in the past, the health metrics of the populations living around the Aral Sea have been steadily improving over the previous years.

=== Efforts to revive the Aral Sea ===
Efforts to revive the Aral Sea primarily focus on promoting sanitary-epidemiology, socio-economic mitigation, and preventative work. These efforts have been shaped by Kazakh scientists alluding to the low likelihood the sea will return to its original state.

Since 1992, the Interstate Commission for Water Coordination (ICWC) and United Nations Environment Programme (UNDP) have been pushing efforts to revive the Aral Sea.

The efforts included Syr Darya Control & Northern Aral Sea (NAS) project. The $86 million NAS project, funded jointly by the World Bank through a loan of $65 million and the Government of Kazakhstan which covered the rest, was designed to mitigate the environmental and economic damage to the region, sustain and increase agriculture and fishing in the Syr Darya basin and secure the continued existence of the Northern Aral Sea (also known as the Small Sea) by improving environmental and ecological conditions in the delta area.

In addition, three revival programs were designed for implementation in the Aral Sea Basin (ASBP 1, ASBP 2 and ASBP 3). The most detailed and comprehensive of these, ASBP 3, covers the 2011-2015 period and was developed during Kazakhstan's presidency of the executive committee of IFAS.

This stage of the project is referred to as RRSSAM-1 and was completed in 2008.

As of 2021, the "Syrdarya river bed Control and preservation of the northern part of the Aral Sea" is the main preservation effort of the Aral Sea. This effort is funded by a 64.5 million USD loan from the World Bank and a 21.29 million USD allocation from the Kazakhstan government. Additionally, RRSSAM-2, the second part of the 2008 restoration effort, was started in the northern sea. This project has a 23 billion USD initial budget.
