= International rankings of Kazakhstan =

These are the international rankings of Kazakhstan.

== International rankings ==
| Organization | Survey | Ranking |
|---|---|---|
| Institute for Economics and Peace | Global Peace Index | 84 out of 144 |
| United Nations Development Programme | Human Development Index | 82 out of 182 |
| Transparency International | Corruption Perceptions Index | 120 out of 180 |
| World Economic Forum | Global Competitiveness Report | 67 out of 133 |

== International rankings 2015 ==
| Organization | Survey | Ranking |
|---|---|---|
| Institute for Economics and Peace | Global Peace Index | 87 out of 162 |
| Transparency International | Corruption Perceptions Index | 123 out of 168 |
| World Economic Forum | Global Competitiveness Report | 50 out of 144 |
| ATKearney | Global Retail Development Index | 13 out of 30 |
| Fund for Peace and Foreign Policy | Fragile States Index | 110 out of 178 |
| Social Progress Imperative | Social Progress Index | 83 out of 134 |
| World Economic Forum | Travel & Tourism Competitiveness Index | 85 out of 141 |

== International rankings 2016 ==
| Organization | Survey | Ranking |
|---|---|---|
| World Economic Forum | Global Competitiveness Report | 42 out of 140 |
| ATKearney | Global Retail Development Index | 4 out of 30 |
| Fund for Peace and Foreign Policy | Fragile States Index | 113 out of 178 |
| Social Progress Imperative | Social Progress Index | 76 out of 133 |

== International rankings 2017 ==
| Organization | Survey | Ranking |
|---|---|---|
| World Economic Forum | Travel & Tourism Competitiveness Index | 81 out of 136 |

== International rankings 2018 ==
| Organization | Survey | Ranking |
|---|---|---|
| World Economic Forum | Global Competitiveness Report | 59 out of 140 |
| World Bank | Ease of Doing Business | 36 out of 190 |

== International rankings 2019 ==
| Organization | Survey | Ranking |
|---|---|---|
| World Economic Forum | Global Competitiveness Report | 55 out of 140 |
| World Bank | Ease of Doing Business | 28 out of 190 |

== International rankings 2020 ==
| Organization | Survey | Ranking |
|---|---|---|
| World Bank | Ease of Doing Business | 25 out of 190 |

== International rankings 2026 ==
| Organization | Survey | Ranking |
|---|---|---|
| World Intellectual Property Organization | Global Innovation Index, 2026 | 73 out of 139 |
