= Bulandy District =

Coordinates: 52°37′45″N 70°25′01″E

Bulandy
- District
- Būlandy audany
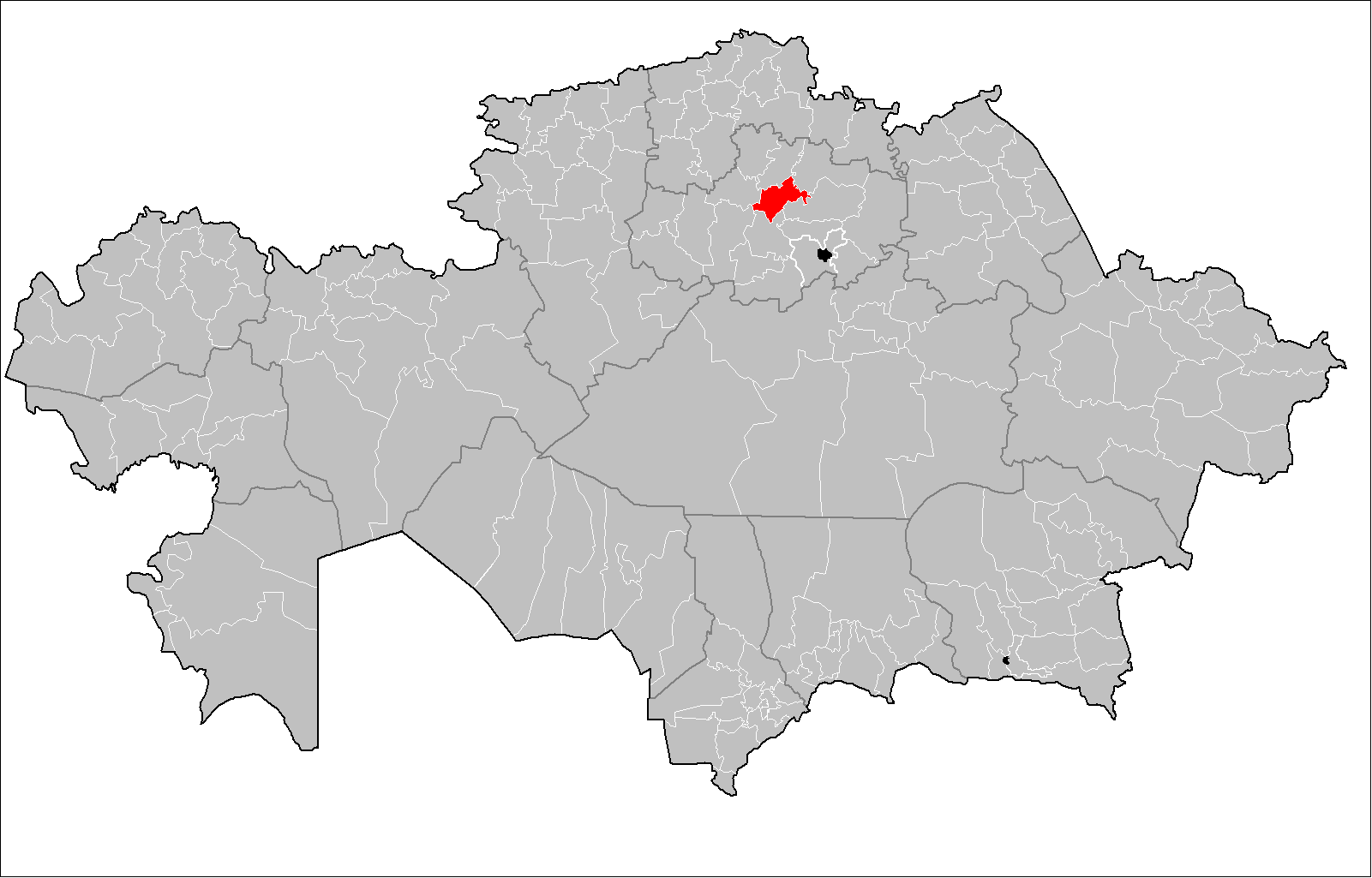
- Country: Kazakhstan
- Region: Aqmola Region
- Administrative center: Makinsk
- Founded: 1930

Area
  - Total: 2,500 sq mi (6,400 km^{2})

Population (2013)
  - Total: 34,761
- Time zone: UTC+6 (East)

Bulandy District (Kazakh: Бұланды ауданы, romanized: Būlandy audany) is a district of Aqmola Region in northern Kazakhstan. The administrative center of the district is the town of Makinsk. Population: 34,815 (2009 census results); 41,387 (1999 census results).

== Geography ==
Lake Taldykol and river Boksyk are located in the district.
