= Shortandy =

- village
- Location within Kazakhstan
- Coordinates: 51°41′51″N 70°59′41″E
- Country: Kazakhstan
- Region: Aqmola Region
- District: Shortandy District

Population (2015)
  - Total: 6,060
- Time zone: UTC+6

Shortandy (Kazakh: Шортанды, Şortandy), is a village in northern-central Kazakhstan. It is the seat of Shortandy District in Aqmola Region.
