= Makinsk =

- Town
- Location within Kazakhstan
- Coordinates: 52°37′45″N 70°25′1″E
- Country: Kazakhstan
- Region: Akmola Region
- District: Bulandy District

Population (2012)
  - Total: 16 818
- Time zone: UTC+5 (UTC + 5)
- Postal code: 020500

Makinsk (Kazakh: Макинск, Makinsk; Russian: Макинск) is a town in northern-central Kazakhstan. It is the administrative center of Bulandy District in Aqmola Region. Population: 16,745 (2009 census results);18,540 (1999 census results).

== Geography ==
Makinsk is located in the Kokshetau Hills, in the northern part of the Kazakh Uplands.
