= Astrakhanovka, Azerbaijan =

Astrakhanovka
- Village
- Location within Azerbaijan
- Coordinates: 39°12′42″N 48°31′00″E
- Country: Azerbaijan
- Rayon: Jalilabad
- Time zone: UTC+4 (AZT)

Astrakhanovka is a village in the Jalilabad Rayon of Azerbaijan.
