= Egindikol District =

Coordinates: 50°54′36″N 69°13′48″E

Egindikol
- District
- Egındıköl audany
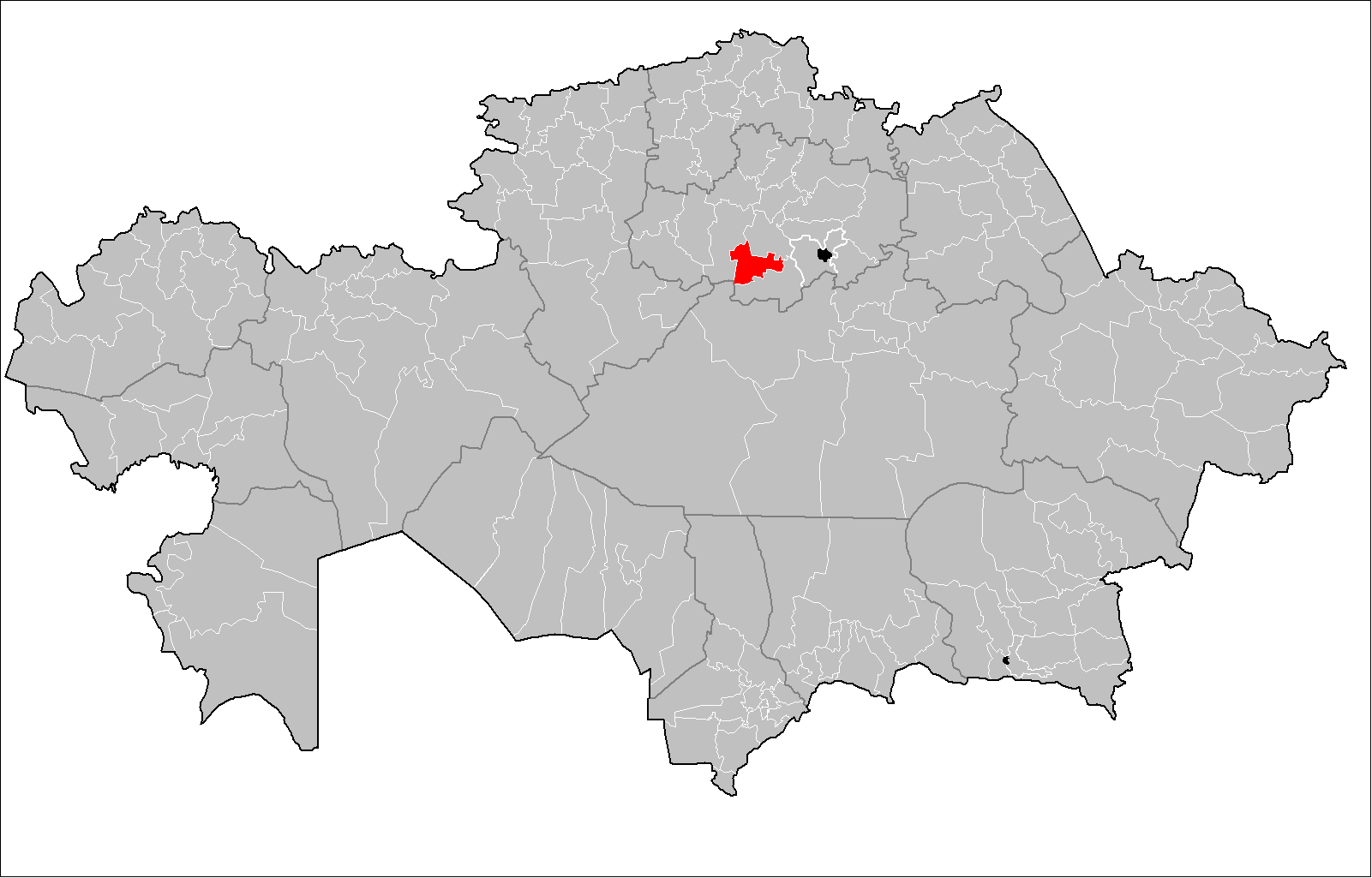
- Country: Kazakhstan
- Region: Aqmola Region
- Administrative center: Egindikol
- Founded: 1971

Government
  - Akim: Mukhamedin Yerlan Kyzdarbekovich

Area
  - Total: 2,100 sq mi (5,400 km^{2})

Population (2013)
  - Total: 6,353
- Time zone: UTC+6 (East)

Egindikol District (Kazakh: Егіндікөл ауданы, Egındıköl audany) is a district of Aqmola Region in northern Kazakhstan. The administrative center of the district is the selo of Egindikol. Population: 6,802 (2009 census results);10,050 (1999 census results).
