= Kalkutan =

Koluton Қалқұтан
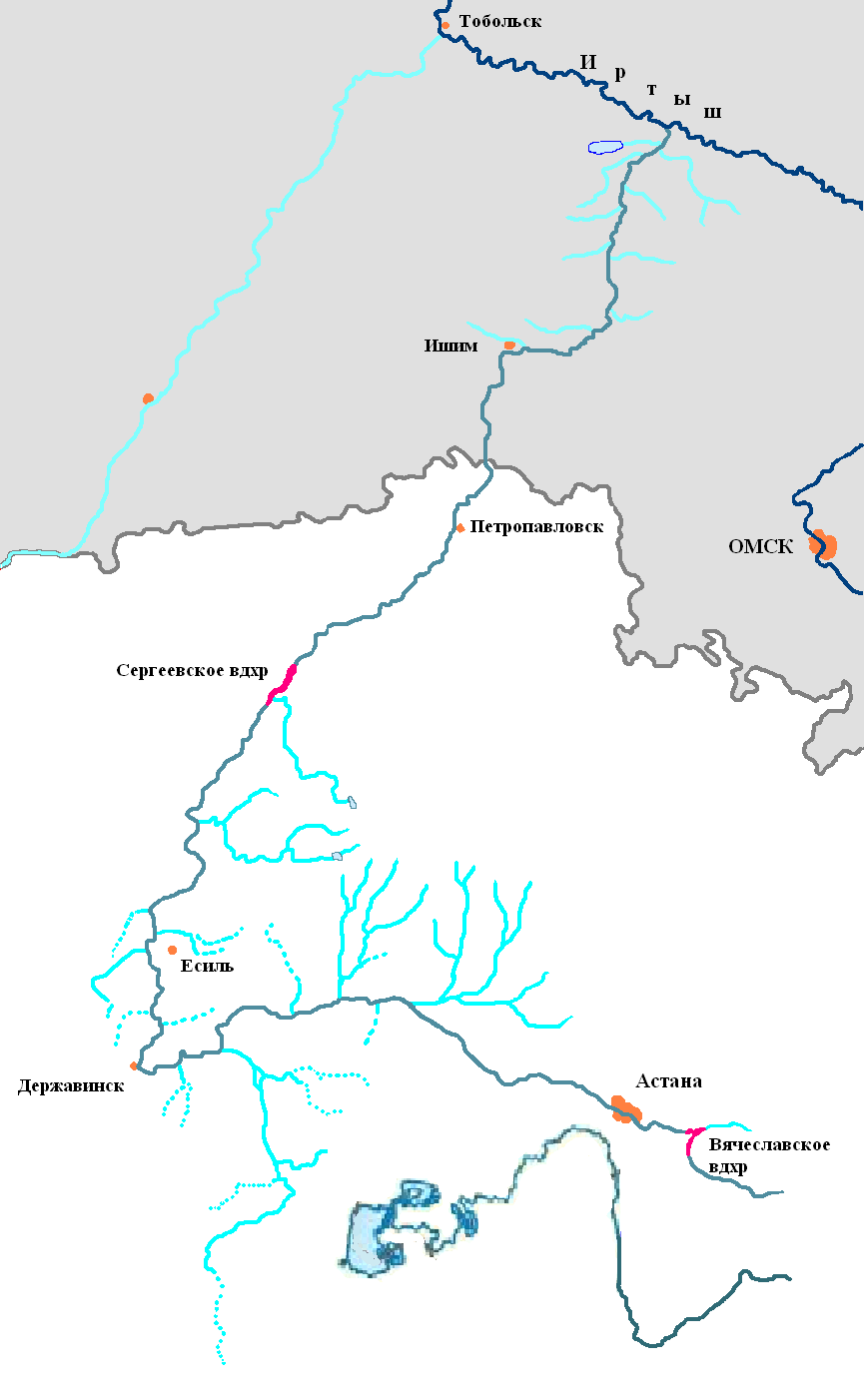
- Ishim basin

- Mouth location in Kazakhstan

Location
- Country: Kazakhstan

Physical characteristics
- Source
  - location: Lake Shortankol
  - coordinates: 51°51′25″N 71°18′05″E
  - elevation: 370 m (0.23 mi)
- Mouth: Ishim
  - coordinates: 51°43′18″N 71°18′05″E
  - elevation: 280 m (0.17 mi)
- Length: 223 km (139 mi)
- Basin size: 17,400 km^{2} (6,700 sq mi)

Basin features
- Progression: Ishim→ Irtysh→ Ob→ Kara Sea

The Koluton (Kazakh: Қалқұтан / Qalqūtan) or Koluton (Russian: Колутон) is a river of the Akmola Region, Kazakhstan. It has a length of 223 km (139 mi) and the size of its basin is 17,400 km^{2} (6,700 sq mi).

== Course ==
The Koluton is a right tributary of the Ishim. It has its sources in lake Shortankol, by Novorybinka village. The river flows roughly westwards all along its course. It joins the right bank of the Ishim a little to the north of Koluton railway station. Its main tributaries are the 68 km (42 mi) long Talkara, the 171 km (106 mi) long Boksyk, the 48 km (30 mi) long Ashchysai, and the 174 km (108 mi) long Arshaly from the right.

== See also ==
- List of rivers of Kazakhstan
- Balyktykol (Shortandy District)
