= Zerendi =

- Town
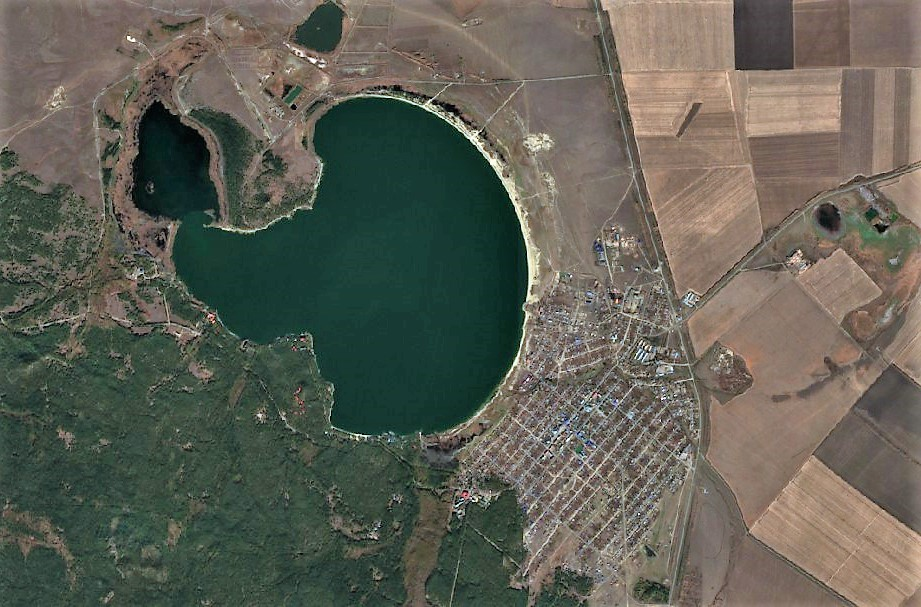
- Zerendi town by the southeastern lakeshore

- Location within Kazakhstan
- Coordinates: 52°54′N 69°09′E
- Country: Kazakhstan
- Region: Aqmola Region
- District: Zerendi District

Population (2010)
  - Total: 8,369
- Time zone: UTC+6 (UTC + 6)
- Postal code: 021200
- Area code: c
- Website: zerenda.ru

Zerendi (Kazakh: Зеренді, Zerendı) is a small town in northern-central Kazakhstan, located 45 kilometres from Kokshetau. It is the seat of Zerendi District in Aqmola Region. Pop 6,800 (1998). Zerendi lies on Lake Zerenda, which is surrounded by small mountains covered with forest. Magnificent nature of this lake attracts many tourists from Russia, Germany and Ukraine.

== History ==
In 1824 Cossacks from Siberia founded a small settlement.

== Sights ==
Zerendi has several places of interest: The Lake Zerenda, The Green Cape, Bear Mount. The major part of Zerenda Lake coastline belongs to private owners, especially western coastline. There are several resort centers there: Zeren, Kharagahjly, Kazakhoil. On the Raspberry Cape there is also a summer residence of the president of the Republic of Kazakhstan.
