= Astrakhan District =

Coordinates: 51°31′42″N 69°47′50″E

Astrakhan
- District
- Astrahan audany
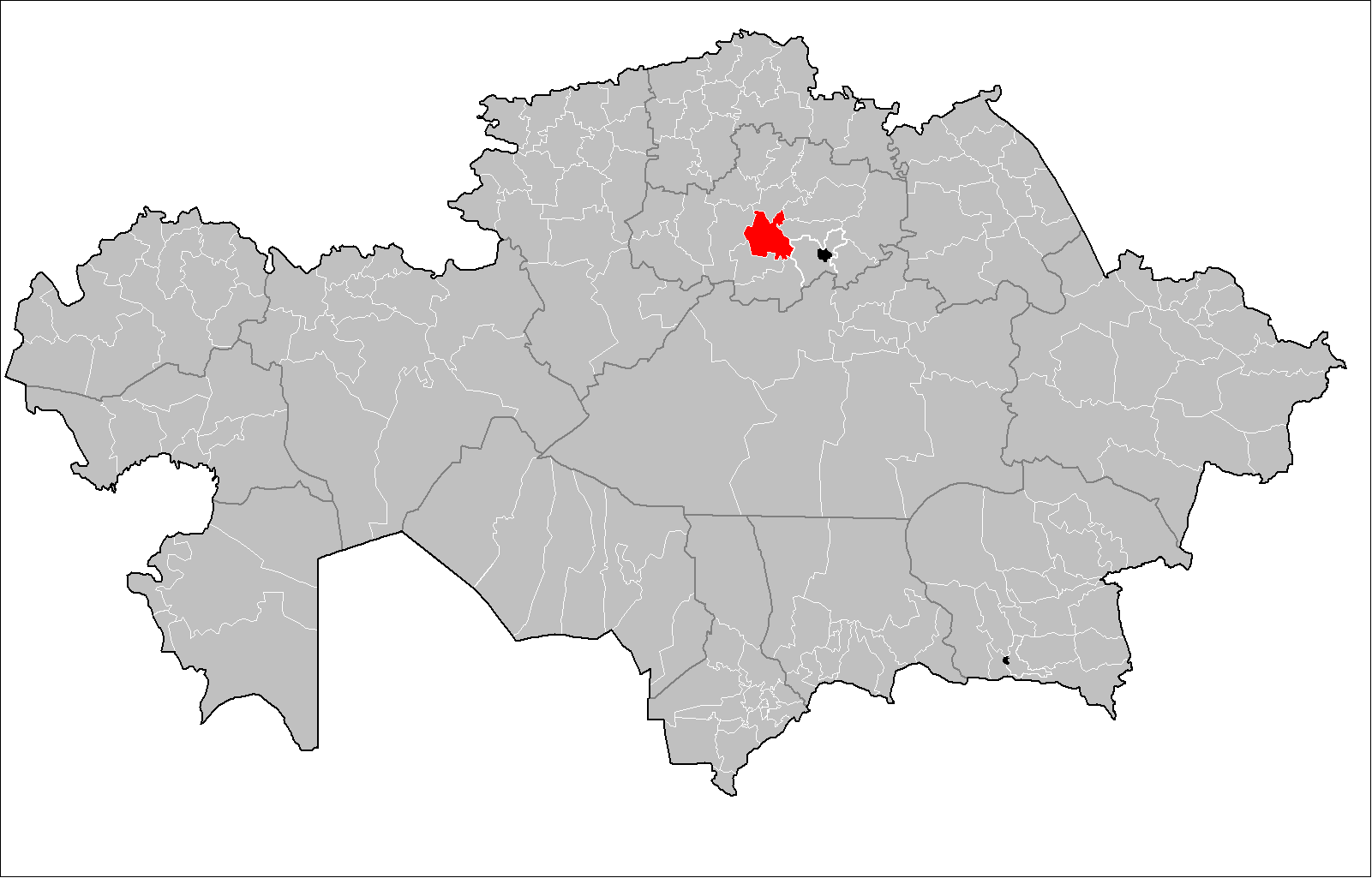
- Country: Kazakhstan
- Region: Aqmola Region
- Administrative center: Astrakhanka
- Founded: 1936

Government
  - Akim: Seilov Nurlan Kazezovich

Area
  - Total: 2,900 sq mi (7,400 km^{2})

Population (2013)
  - Total: 25,524
- Time zone: UTC+6 (East)

Astrakhan District (Kazakh: Астрахан ауданы, romanized: Astrahan audany) is a district of Aqmola Region in northern Kazakhstan. The administrative center of the district is the village of Astrakhanka. Population: 27,419 (2009 census results);32,980 (1999 census results).

== Geography ==
The Ishim river, Kalkutan, Arshaly and Boksyk flow across Astrakhan District. Lakes Barshyn, Alakol and Uzynkol are located in the district.
