= Zerendi District =

Coordinates: 52°56′24″N 69°11′24″E

Zerendi Зеренді
- District
- Zerendi awdanı
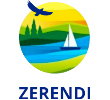
- Seal

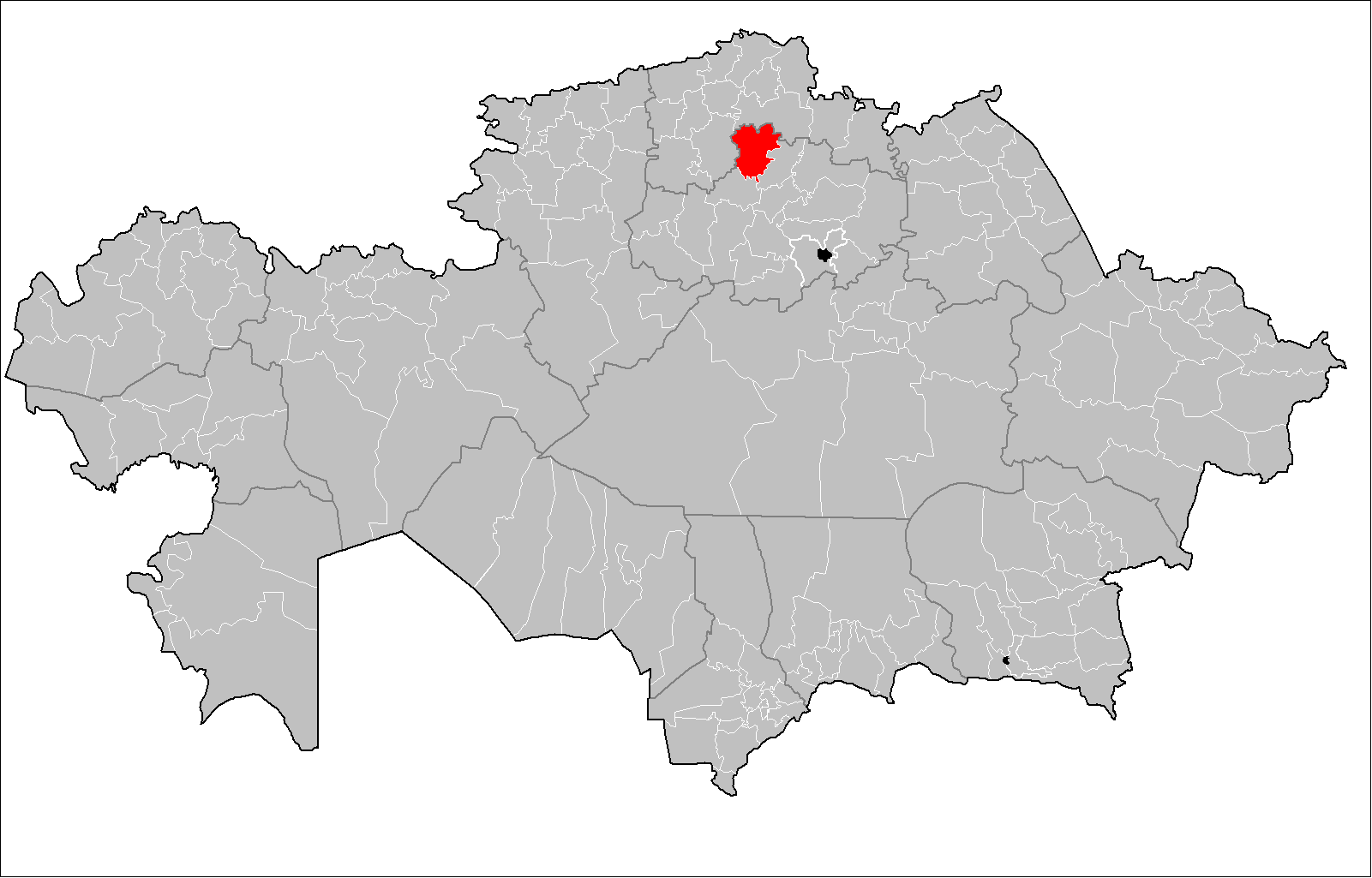
- Country: Kazakhstan
- Regione: Akmola Region
- Administrative center: Zerendi
- Founded: 1936

Government
  - Akim: Zhaksylykov Asen Dulatovich

Area
  - Total: 3,000 sq mi (7,800 km^{2})

Population (2013)
  - Total: 39,972
- Time zone: UTC+6 (East)

Zerendi District (Kazakh: Зеренді ауданы) is a district of Akmola Region in northern Kazakhstan. The administrative center of the district is Zerendi. Population: 40,591 (2009 census results); 50,206 (1999 census results).

== Geography ==
Lakes Zerendi, Zheltau, Zhamantuz, Aydabol and Karaungir, as well as rivers Shagalaly, Arshaly and Zhabay, are located in the district.
