= Astrakhanka, Kazakhstan =

Astrakhanka
- Village
- Location within Kazakhstan
- Coordinates: 51°31′42″N 69°47′50″E
- Country: Kazakhstan
- Region: Aqmola Region
- District: Astrakhan District

Population (2009)
  - Total: 6,313
- Time zone: UTC+6 (UTC + 6)

Astrakhanka (Kazakh: Астраханка, romanized: Astrahanka) is a village in northern-central Kazakhstan. It is the administrative center of Astrakhan District in Akmola Region. Population: 6,313 (2009 census results); 6,566 (1999 census results).
