= Kokshetau (disambiguation) =

Kokshetau (Kazakh: Көкшетау / [køkɕetɑw] / — «Blueish Mountain») is a city in Akmola Region, Kazakhstan, which may consist of :

- the City of Kokshetau
- the Kokshetau City Administration
- the Kokshetau Region, former administrative division in Kazakh Soviet Socialist Republic and later Kazakhstan

Kokshetau may also refer to:

- Kokshetau Hills, a mountain system of the Kazakh Uplands
- Kokshetau Lakes, a lake group in Akmola and Northern Kazakhstan regions
- Kokshetau Mountains, a small mountain range in Akmola Region, highest point Mount Kokshe
- Kokshetau National Park, a protected area in Akmola and Karaganda regions, Kazakhstan
- Kokshetau Airport, an airport in Akmola Region, Kazakhstan
- Kokshetau-1 station
- Kokshetau-2 station

== Sports ==
- FC Kokshetau, former name of a football club from Kokshetau, Kazakhstan.
