= Kumdykol (Burabay District) =

Lake in Kazakhstan

- Құмдыкөл
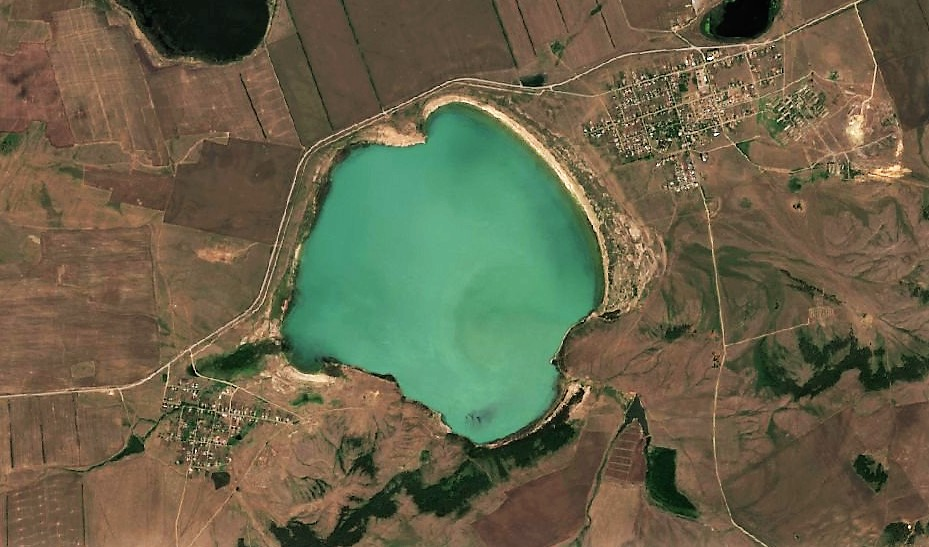
- Sentinel-2 picture of the lake in June

- Location within Kazakhstan
- Location: Kazakh Uplands
- Coordinates: 52°50′48″N 69°54′24″E
- Type: freshwater lake
- Basin countries: Kazakhstan
- Max. length: 4 kilometers (2.5 mi)
- Max. width: 3.9 kilometers (2.4 mi)
- Surface area: 10.2 square kilometers (3.9 sq mi)
- Residence time: UTC+5:00
- Shore length^{1}: 12.8 kilometers (8.0 mi)
- Surface elevation: 377 meters (1,237 ft)
- Islands: no
- Settlements: Zlatopolye and Savinka
- ^{1} Shore length is not a well-defined measure.

Kumdykol (Kazakh: Құмдыкөл; Russian: Кумдыколь) is a freshwater lake in Burabay District, Akmola Region, Kazakhstan.

The village of Zlatopolye lies close to the northeastern lakeshore and Savinka near a small bay at the southwestern end.

== Geography ==
Kumdykol is located in the Kokshetau Mountains, Kazakh Uplands, and is part of the Irtysh basin. It lies at an elevation of 377 meters (1,237 ft). The lake has a roughly square shape with rounded edges. The shore of the northern part is flat and sandy. The southern stretch is bound by low cliffs. The lake is replenished with melted snow and rainwater. It freezes in November and thaws in late April.

Among the lakes in its vicinity, Karaungir lies 11 kilometers (6.8 mi) to the west, Zhamantuz 22 kilometers (14 mi) to the NNW, Urymkay 12 kilometers (7.5 mi) to the SSE, Balykty 15 kilometers (9.3 mi) to the ESE, and Shchuchye 22 kilometers (14 mi) to the northeast.

== Flora and fauna ==
Kumdykol is surrounded by mountain steppe vegetation and it is used as pasture by local cattle. There is a pine forest in the southern part. The water of the lake is fresh.

== See also ==
- Kokshetau Lakes
- List of lakes of Kazakhstan
