= Maloalexandrovka =

Maloalexandrovka, Maloaleksandrovka (Russian-language names), Maloolexandrivka, Malooleksandrivka (Ukrainian-language names) is the name of the following settlements:

== Kazakhstan ==
- Maloaleksandrovka (Akmolinsk Oblast), a village in Akkol District, Kazakhstan

== Russia ==
- Maloaleksandrovka (Bashkortostan), a village in Belebeyevsky District, Baskortostan, Russia

== Ukraine ==
- Malooleksandrivka (Verkhnodniprovsk Raion)
- Малоолександрівка (Павлоградський район)
- Малоолександрівка (Троїцький район)
- Малоолександрівка (Скадовський район)
