= Zhokey =

Lake in Kazakhstan

- Жөкей
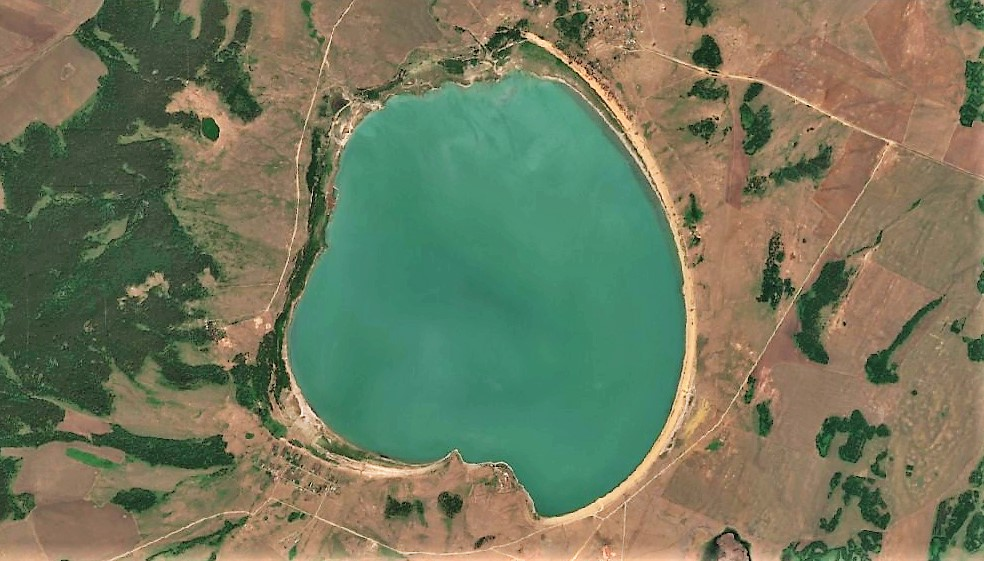
- Sentinel-2 picture of the lake

- Location within Kazakhstan
- Location: Kazakh Uplands
- Coordinates: 52°53′35″N 70°34′59″E
- Type: salt lake
- Primary inflows: Sarymsak
- Primary outflows: Sarymsak
- Basin countries: Kazakhstan
- Max. length: 5.5 kilometers (3.4 mi)
- Max. width: 4.6 kilometers (2.9 mi)
- Surface area: 19.26 square kilometers (7.44 sq mi)
- Average depth: 1.5 meters (4 ft 11 in)
- Max. depth: 1.8 meters (5 ft 11 in)
- Residence time: UTC+5:00
- Surface elevation: 382 meters (1,253 ft)
- Islands: no
- Settlements: Zhukey, Karlovka and Kyzyluyum

Zhokey (Kazakh: Жөкей), also known as Zhukey (Russian: Жукей), is a salt lake in Birzhan sal District, Akmola Region, Kazakhstan.

The villages of Zhukey, Karlovka, and Kyzyluyum are located by the lakeshore. Stepnyak town, the district capital, lies 11 kilometers (6.8 mi) to the ESE.

== Geography ==
Zhokey lies at the northern end of the Kazakh Uplands and is part of the Irtysh basin. It lies at an elevation of 351 meters (1,152 ft). It has a roughly round shape, quite regular on the eastern part. The Sarymsak river flows into the lake from the north. In years of abundant water it may flow out from the southeast, connecting Zhokey with neighboring lake Kotyrkol. The shores of the lake are steep in the western and southern stretches and gently sloping in the remaining perimeter. The slopes of 523 meters (1,716 ft) high Burkitty Mountain rise beyond the western lakeshore.

Among the lakes in its vicinity, Kotyrkol lies 12 kilometers (7.5 mi) to the SSE, small lake Kotyrkol 9 kilometers (5.6 mi) to the northwest, Balytkty 24 kilometers (15 mi) to the WSW, Shchuchye 22 kilometers (14 mi) to the WNW and Mamay 50 kilometers (31 mi) to the southeast.

== Flora and fauna ==
Hayfields grow near the shores of the lake.

== See also ==
- Kokshetau Lakes
- List of lakes of Kazakhstan
