= Kokshetau Oblast =

Former administrative division of KSSR and Kazakhstan

Kokshetau Oblast Көкшетау облысы (Kazakh) Кокшетауская область (Russian)
- Oblast of the Kazakh SSR (1944–1991) and Kazakhstan (1991–1997)
- 1944–1997
- Kokshetau Oblast (red) and Kazakh SSR (grey)
- Capital: Kokshetau
- Area
  - Coordinates: 53°16′N 69°22′E
  - 1989: 78,100 km^{2} (30,200 sq mi)
- Population
  - 1989: 664,282
- History
  - Established: 16 March 1944
  - Disestablished: 3 May 1997
- Political subdivisions: 15 raions (districts) and two municipalities

The capital of KazSSR's Kokshetau Oblast was Kokchetav (click to enlarge map). KazSSR oblasts 1959

Kokshetau Oblast (Kazakh: Көкшетау облысы, Kökşetau oblısı [køkɕetɑw obləsə]; ‹The template Lang-rus is being considered for deletion.› Russian: Кокшета́уская о́бласть, romanized: Kokshetauskaya oblast', IPA: [kokʂɪˈtaʊskəjə ˈobləsʲtʲ]), was an administrative division (an oblast) of the former Kazakh Soviet Socialist Republic (1944–1991) in the Soviet Union, established on March 16, 1944. Upon Kazakhstan's independence in 1991, the oblast continued to exist until May 3, 1997. It was formerly known between 1944 and 1993 as Kokchetav Oblast (‹The template Lang-rus is being considered for deletion.› Russian: Кокчета́вская о́бласть, romanized: Kokchetavskaya oblast', IPA: [koktɕɪˈtavskəjə ˈobləsʲtʲ]).

Located in between latitudes 53° and 16° N and longitudes 69° and 22° E, Kokshetau Oblast was bordered to the northeast by the Omsk Oblast, to the north by the North Kazakhstan Oblast, to the east by the Pavlodar Oblast, and to the south by the Akmolinsk Oblast. The oblast was located in the northern part of Kazakh SSR (later Kazakhstan), and its territory is currently divided between North Kazakhstan and Akmola regions. It had a territory of 78,100 km^{2} (30,200 sq mi) and, as of 1989 All-Union Census, the population of the oblast was 664,282 persons. The oblast was administratively subdivided into 15 raions and two municipalities of Kokchetav and Shchuchinsk.

The administrative center and the largest city of Kokshetau Oblast was the eponymous city of Kokchetav (Kokshetau), after which it was named.

== Geography ==
Kokshetau Oblast was geographically located in the northern part of Kazakh SSR (modern-day Kazakhstan), on the border of the West Siberian Plain and the Kazakh Uplands. Much of the oblast's relief was hilly, with Gora Sinyukha rising as high as 947 metres (3,107 ft) above sea level.

In 1959, the oblast shared borders with Russian SFSR (Omsk Oblast) to the northeast. The region also touched three other regions of Kazakh SSR: Akmolinsk Oblast to the south, Pavlodar Oblast to the east, and North Kazakhstan Oblast to the north.

Kokshetau Oblast had an area of 78,100 square kilometres.

=== Time zone ===
Kokshetau Oblast was located in the Omsk Time Zone (OMST) (UTC+06:00).

=== Climate ===
The region had cold winters and warm summers.

== History ==
Kokchetav Oblast was established on 16 March 1944 on the lands that previously belonged to North Kazakhstan and Akmolinsk oblasts, with its seat in the city of Kokchetav. It was subdivided into 15 districts (raions) and two municipalities of Kokchetav and Shchuchinsk.

From 1944 to 1993 it was named Kokchetav Oblast (Russian: Кокчета́вская о́бласть, romanized: Kokchetavskaya oblast'). The oblast was named after its administrative center, the city of Kokchetav.

In October 1993 the oblast of Kokchetav (Russian: Кокчета́вская) was renamed into the more Kazakh sounding Kokshetau Oblast.

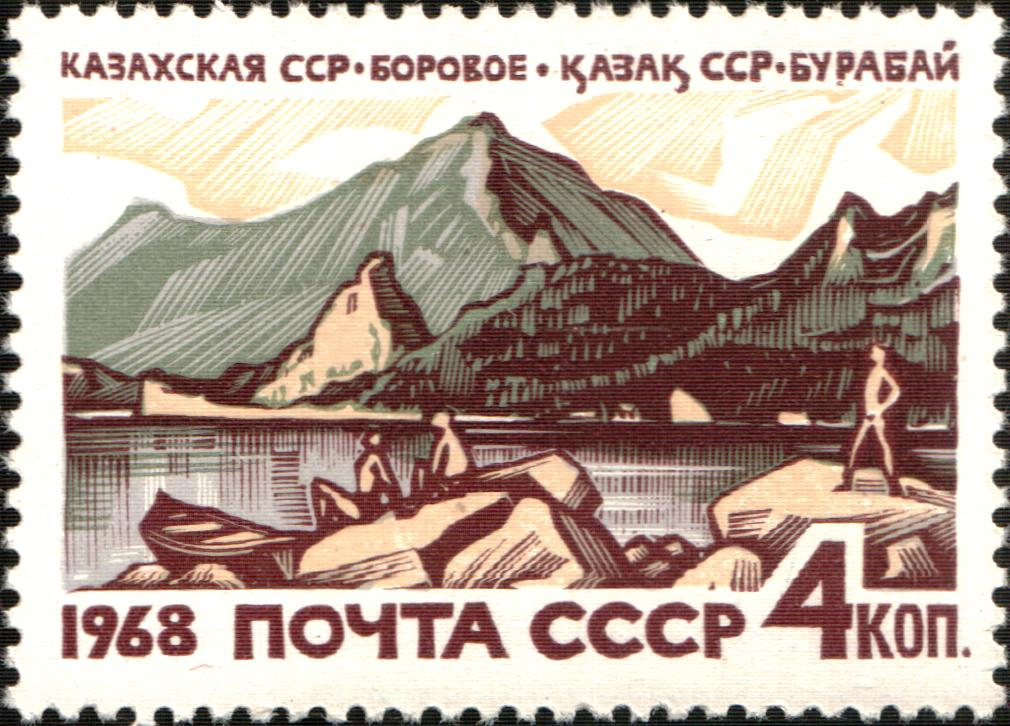
USSR stamp: Borovoe

== Demographics ==
Historical populations in Kokshetau Oblast
Year	Pop.	±%
1959	493,319	—
1970	589,204	+19.4%
1979	616,106	+4.6%
1989	664,282	+7.8%
Note: 1959, 1970, 1979 and 1989 are the Soviet Census.; Source:

As of the 1989 Census, 39.1% of the oblast's population lived in urban areas. The most populous city was the Oblast's administrative center, Kokchetav, with 138,814 inhabitants. Other large cities and towns include Shchuchinsk, Krasnoarmeysk, and Stepnyak.

=== Ethnic composition ===
The region was a home to significant minority populations. According to the 1970 Census, the ethnic composition (de jure population) of the Kokchetav Oblast was as follows:

- Russian: 40.0%
- Kazakh: 23.0%
- along with Ukrainians, Germans, Belarusians, Tatars and Mordvins.

== Administrative divisions ==
In 1989 the oblast was split into 15 raions and two municipalities of Kokchetav and Shchuchinsk:

Kokshetau (the Soviet Union)

No.	District	Capital	Population
1	Kokchetavskiy gorsovet	Kokchetav	138 814
2	Shchuchinskiy gorsovet	Shchuchinsk	62 824
3	Arykbalykskiy	Arykbalyk	26 761
4	Valikhanovskiy	Valikhanovo	19 392
5	Volodarskiy	Volodarskoye	48 988
6	Zerendinskiy	Zerenda	30 519
7	Kellerovskiy	Kellerovka	23 817
8	Kzyltuskiy	Kzyltu	29 791
9	Kokchetavskiy	Krasny Yar	43 797
10	Krasnoarmeyskiy	Krasnoarmeysk	33 564
11	Kuybyshevskiy	Kuybyshevskiy	25 952
12	Leningradskiy	Leningradskoye	37 706
13	Ruzayevskiy	Ruzayevka	22 827
14	Chistopol'skiy	Chistopol'ye	21 481
15	Chkalovskiy	Chkalovo	31 585
16	Shchuchinsky	Shchuchinsk	37 170
17	Enbekshil'derskiy	Stepnyak	29 294

== See also ==
- Administrative divisions of Kazakhstan
