= Atansor =

Lake in Kazakhstan

- Атансор
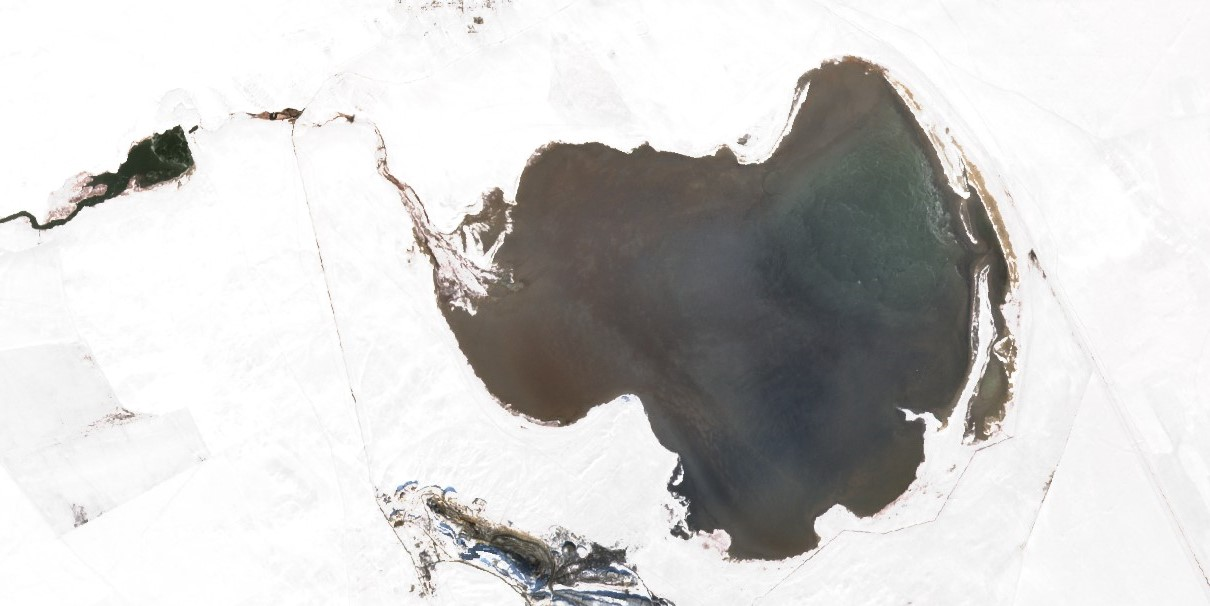
- Sentinel-2 picture of the lake

- Location within Kazakhstan
- Location: Kazakh Uplands
- Coordinates: 52°43′59″N 71°33′43″E
- Type: endorheic lake
- Primary inflows: Atan
- Primary outflows: none
- Catchment area: 1,160 square kilometers (450 sq mi)
- Basin countries: Kazakhstan
- Max. length: 7.7 kilometers (4.8 mi)
- Max. width: 6.1 kilometers (3.8 mi)
- Surface area: 26.7 square kilometers (10.3 sq mi)
- Average depth: ca 1 meter (3 ft 3 in)
- Residence time: UTC+5:00
- Shore length^{1}: 27.2 kilometers (16.9 mi)
- Surface elevation: 221 meters (725 ft)
- Islands: no
- Settlements: Enbekshilder
- ^{1} Shore length is not a well-defined measure.

Atansor (Kazakh: Атансор) is a salt lake in Birzhan sal District, Akmola Region, Kazakhstan.

Enbekshilder is located close to the northern lakeshore and now abolished Atansor village close to the southwestern one. The name "Atansor" was probably given because of a camel drowning in the lake in the past.

== Geography ==
Atansor is an endorheic lake of the northern end of the Kazakh Uplands. It lies in a basin among low hills at an elevation of 221.2 meters (726 ft). It has an irregular shape, with wide bays in the north and in the south of the eastern part. The Atan river flows into the lake from the northwest.

Atansor is usually replenished in the spring with melted snow from the surrounding steppe. The water is salty and the lake mostly dries up in summer, turning into a sor. The shores of the lake are flat and smooth, except for a few rocky and steep stretches. The lake bottom is rough and filled with sediments.

Among the lakes in its vicinity, Zhambaysor lies 16 kilometers (9.9 mi) to the east, Mamay 27 kilometers (17 mi) to the southwest, Kotyrkol 50 kilometers (31 mi) to the west, Zhokey 60 kilometers (37 mi) to the WNW and Koksengirsor 27 kilometers (17 mi) to the NNE.

== Flora and fauna ==
About 30% of the land surface surrounding the lake consists in plowed agricultural fields. The remaining is used for livestock grazing and is covered with steppe vegetation, where sagebrush, needlegrass, and fescue predominate. Local tradition says that in the past the lake water was used for drinking and that fish lived in its waters.

== See also ==
- List of lakes of Kazakhstan
- Sor (geomorphology)
