= Kotyrkol (Burabay District) =

Lake in Kazakhstan

- Қотыркөл
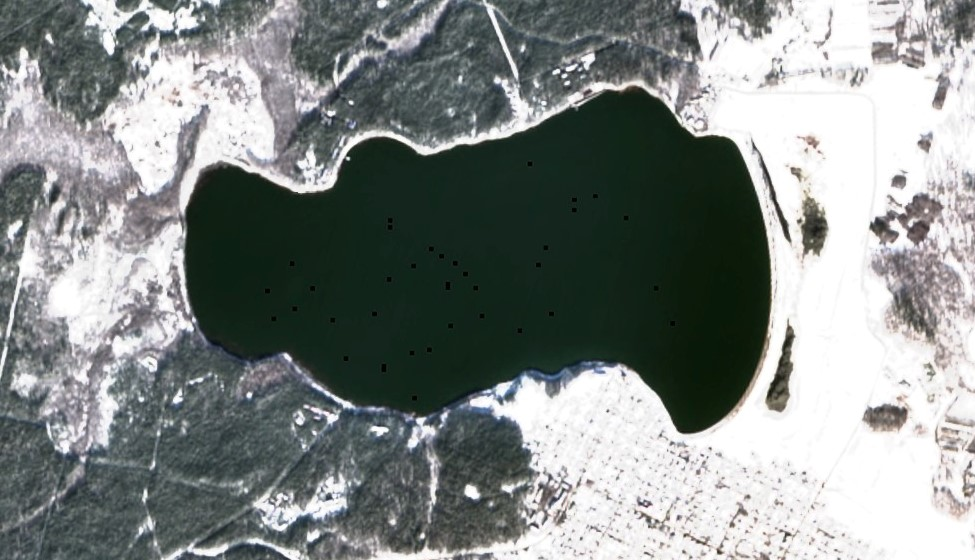
- Sentinel-2 picture of the lake

- Location within Kazakhstan
- Location: Kazakh Uplands
- Coordinates: 52°57′50″N 70°24′14″E
- Type: freshwater lake
- Basin countries: Kazakhstan
- Max. length: 3.4 kilometers (2.1 mi)
- Max. width: 1.6 kilometers (0.99 mi)
- Surface area: 4.59 square kilometers (1.77 sq mi)
- Average depth: 2.5 meters (8 ft 2 in)
- Max. depth: 7.7 meters (25 ft)
- Water volume: 0.0118 cubic kilometers (0.0028 cu mi)
- Residence time: UTC+5:00
- Shore length^{1}: 9.8 kilometers (6.1 mi)
- Surface elevation: 441 meters (1,447 ft)
- Islands: no
- Settlements: Katarkol
- ^{1} Shore length is not a well-defined measure.

Kotyrkol (Kazakh: Қотыркөл), also known as "Katarkol" (Russian: Катарколь) is a lake in Burabay District, Akmola Region, Kazakhstan.

Katarkol village lies by the southeastern lakeshore and Shchuchinsk town, the district capital, is located 11 kilometers (6.8 mi) to the west.

== Geography ==
Kotyrkol lies at an elevation of 441 meters (1,447 ft) in the Kokshetau Mountains, Kazakh Uplands. It is part of the Irtysh basin and has an elongated shape oriented in a roughly east–west direction. The bottom is mainly composed of sand and gravel. The shores of Kotyrkol are open and gently sloping, only some stretches are muddy. The lake water is slightly brackish and the surface level has dropped about 2 meters (6 ft 7 in) since 1957. Concerns have been raised about increased pollution.

Among the lakes in its vicinity, Zhokey lies 10 kilometers (6.2 mi) to the southeast, Shchuchye 9.5 kilometers (5.9 mi) to the west, Balytkty 19 kilometers (12 mi) to the southwest and Burabay 12 kilometers (7.5 mi) to the NNW.

== Flora and fauna ==
There are reeds growing on the northwestern lakeshore. Birch and pine forests grow to the north and to the southwest of the lake. The main fish species in its waters are crucian carp, common roach and perch.

== See also ==
- Kokshetau Lakes
- List of lakes of Kazakhstan
