= Akkol District =

Coordinates: 52°00′N 70°56′E

Aqköl
- District
- Aqköl audany
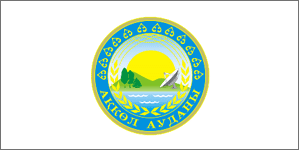
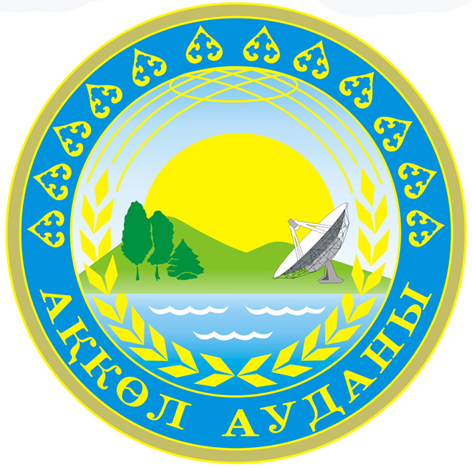
- Flag Coat of arms

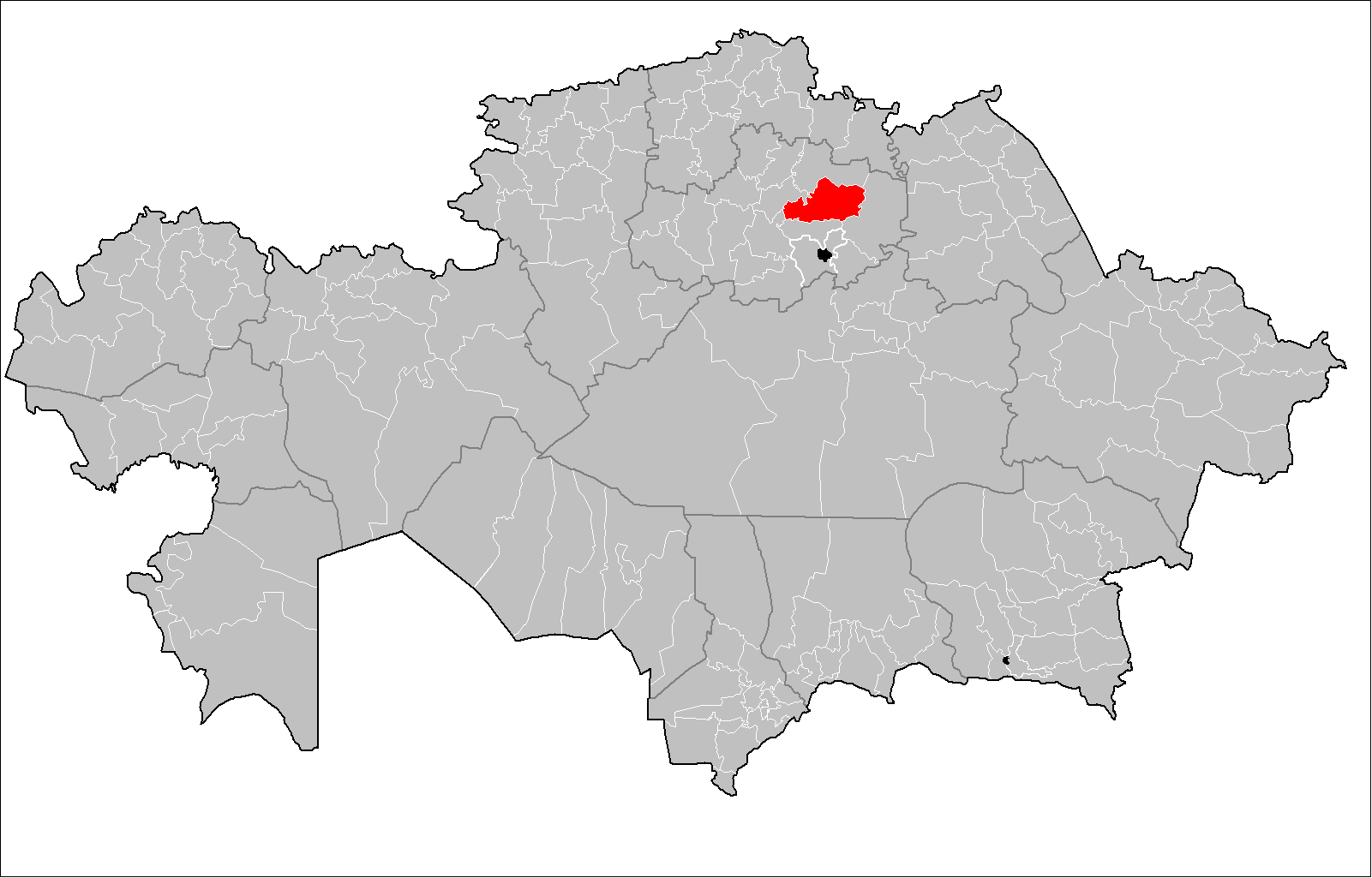
- Country: Kazakhstan
- Region: Aqmola Region
- Administrative center: Aqköl
- Founded: 1930

Government
  - Akim (mayor): Birzhan Abdrakhmanov

Area
  - Total: 3,600 sq mi (9,400 km^{2})

Population (2013)
  - Total: 27,522
- Time zone: UTC+6 (East)

Aqköl District (Kazakh: Ақкөл ауданы, Aqköl audany) is a district (audan) of Aqmola Region in northern Kazakhstan. The administrative center of the district is the town of Aqköl. The population at the time of the 2009 Kazakh Census was 28,359.

== Geography ==
Lake Itemgen and parts of lakes Mamay and Shoshkaly are located in the district.

== Communities ==
- Aqköl (Administrative Center)
- Azat
- Bogembay
- Kirovo
- Kvartsitka
- Minskoye
- Stepnogorsk
- Urupinka
