= Kotyrkol =

Lake in Kazakhstan

- Қотыркөл
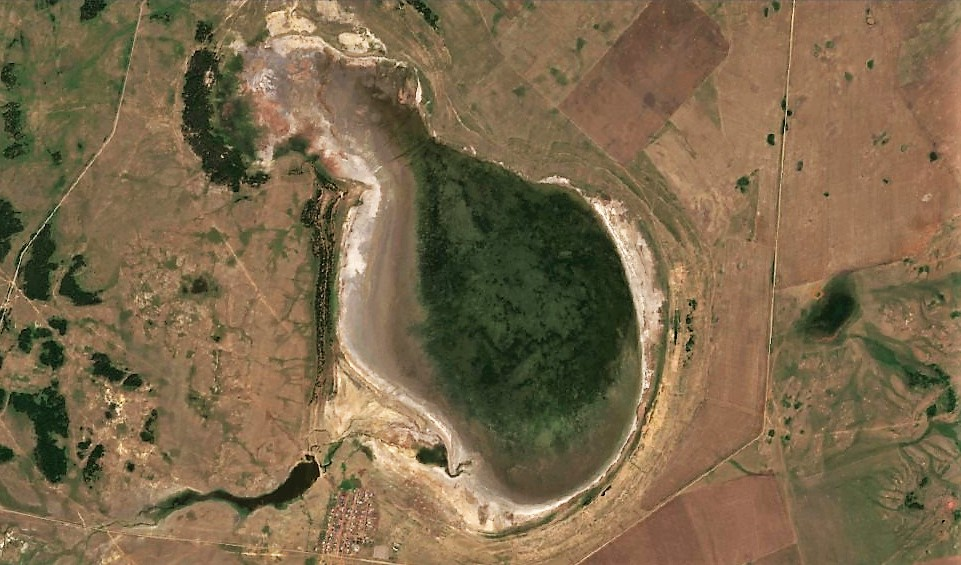
- Sentinel-2 picture of the lake

- Location within Kazakhstan
- Location: Kazakh Uplands
- Coordinates: 52°45′46″N 70°43′36″E
- Type: salt lake
- Primary outflows: Sarymsak
- Catchment area: 29.9 square kilometers (11.5 sq mi)
- Basin countries: Kazakhstan
- Max. length: 6.1 kilometers (3.8 mi)
- Max. width: 3.3 kilometers (2.1 mi)
- Surface area: 18.7 square kilometers (7.2 sq mi)
- Max. depth: 7.7 meters (25 ft)
- Water volume: 0.019 cubic kilometers (0.0046 cu mi)
- Residence time: UTC+5:00
- Shore length^{1}: 20.4 kilometers (12.7 mi)
- Surface elevation: 351 meters (1,152 ft)
- Islands: no
- Settlements: Stepnyak
- ^{1} Shore length is not a well-defined measure.

Kotyrkol (Kazakh: Қотыркөл) is a salt lake in Birzhan sal District, Akmola Region, Kazakhstan.

Stepnyak town, the district capital, is located 5 kilometers (3.1 mi) to the NNE of the northern lakeshore.

== Geography ==
Kotyrkol lies at the northern end of the Kazakh Uplands and is part of the Irtysh basin. It lies at an elevation of 351 meters (1,152 ft). It has an elongated shape oriented in a roughly southeast–northwest direction, with the wider southern part tapering towards the north. Numerous small rivulets flow into the lake from the west. In the years of abundant water the lake is connected to neighboring lake Zhokey through the Sarymsak river. The shores of Kotyrkol are sloping and the lake bottom is muddy.

Among the lakes in its vicinity, Zhokey lies 12 kilometers (7.5 mi) to the NNW, Mamay 33 kilometers (21 mi) to the southeast, Balytkty 34 kilometers (21 mi) to the west, Shchuchye 38 kilometers (24 mi) to the northwest and Atansor 50 kilometers (31 mi) to the east.

== Flora and fauna ==
Reeds, such as Phragmites and Stipa, grow along the western shore of Kotyrkol. The basin of the lake is a seasonal grazing ground for local cattle.

== See also ==
- List of lakes of Kazakhstan
