= Urymkay =

Lake in Kazakhstan

- Ұрымқай
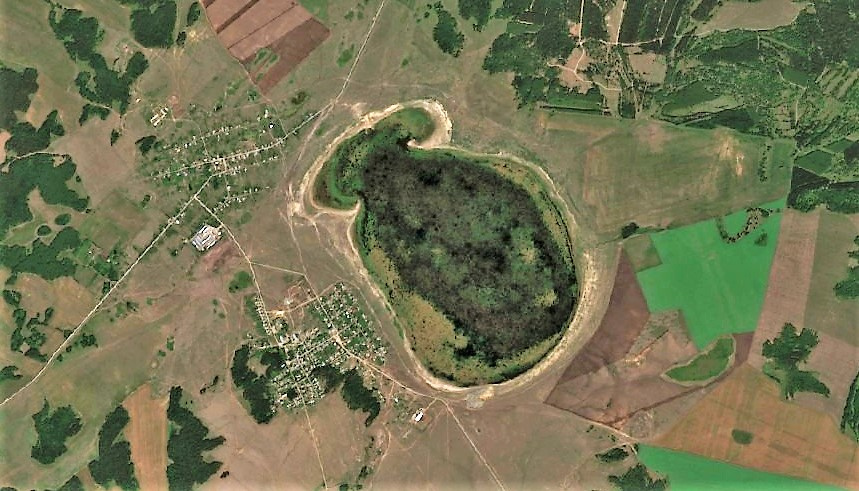
- Sentinel-2 picture of the lake

- Location within Kazakhstan
- Location: Kazakh Uplands
- Coordinates: 52°42′49″N 70°01′11″E
- Type: freshwater lake
- Basin countries: Kazakhstan
- Max. length: 3.5 kilometers (2.2 mi)
- Max. width: 2.4 kilometers (1.5 mi)
- Surface area: 6.03 square kilometers (2.33 sq mi)
- Residence time: UTC+5:00
- Surface elevation: 425 meters (1,394 ft)
- Islands: no
- Settlements: Urymkay and Dmitriyevka

Urymkay (Kazakh: Ұрымқай) or Urumkay (Russian: Урумкай) is a lake in Burabay District, Akmola Region, Kazakhstan.

The village of Urymkay is located close to the southwestern lakeshore, and Dmitriyevka near the northwestern end. Shchuchinsk town, the district capital, lies 26 kilometers (16 mi) to the NNE.

== Geography ==
Urymkay is located in the Kokshetau Mountains, Kazakh Uplands, and is part of the Irtysh basin. It lies at an elevation of 425 meters (1,394 ft). The lake has an oval shape oriented in a roughly northwest–southeast direction. Two landspits near the northern section of the lake form a shallow bay.

Among the lakes in its vicinity, Balykty lies 12 kilometers (7.5 mi) to the northeast, Kumdykol 13 kilometers (8.1 mi) to the NNW, Koyandykol 16 kilometers (9.9 mi) to the southwest, Karaungir 26 kilometers (16 mi) to the northwest, and Kotyrkol 45 kilometers (28 mi) to the east.

== Flora and fauna ==
Urymkay is shallow and overgrown with aquatic vegetation. The lake provides water for a quarry located 1.35 km (0.84 mi) to the southwest.

== See also ==
- Kokshetau Lakes
- List of lakes of Kazakhstan
