= Kokshetau City Mäslihat =

Legislature of Kokshetau, Kazakhstan

Kokshetau City Mäslihat Көкшетау қаласының мәслихаты
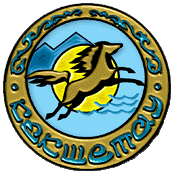

Type
- Type: Unicameral

History
- Founded: 10 December 1993
- Preceded by: Kokchetav City Soviet

Leadership
- Secretary: Akimov Dastan Altayev, Amanat since 31 March 2023

Structure
- Seats: 17
- Political groups: Majority (10); Amanat (10); Opposition (7); Ak Zhol (2); Auyl (1); Respublica (1); Independent (3)
- Length of term: 4 years

Elections
- Voting system: Party-list proportional representation Largest remainder method
- Last election: 19 March 2023
- Next election: 2027

Meeting place
- Kokshetau City Administration

Website
- gov.kz

The Kokshetau City Mäslihat (Kazakh: Көкшетау қаласының мәслихаты, romanized: Kökşetau qalasynyñ mäslihaty) is a local unicameral legislature of Kokshetau which was formed in 1993. The City Mäslihat deals with issues such as city planning, schools, health care, and public transport. The City Mäslihat councillors perform their duties by approving plans, economic and social programs for the city's development.

The 17-seat Council's members are elected every four years in municipal elections. The City Mäslihat is currently chaired by Secretary Akimov Dastan Altayev (Amanat).

Historically, the Amanat has been the largest player in Kokshetau's local politics, with the Ak Zhol being the second largest.

== History ==
On 10 December 1993, the Law "On local representative and executive bodies of the Republic of Kazakhstan" was adopted which brought upon a history of local representative bodies of power in Kazakhstan.

== Functions ==
The City Mäslihat councillors perform their duties on an exempt basis, excluding secretary, who shall be elected from among the council members and shall perform his duties on an exempt basis. The mäslihat has no rights of a legal entity. Within its competence, the mäslihat approves plans, economic and social programs for the city's development, approves and controls the implementation of the budget of the region, regulates land relations, issues of administrative and territorial structure, promotes the implementation by citizens and organizations of the norms of the Constitution of the Republic of Kazakhstan, laws, and acts by the President of Kazakhstan, regulatory actions by the central and local government bodies. The mäslihat exercises its powers at meetings, through the standing committees, chairman of the session and secretary along with the mäslihat councillors.

== Commissions ==
For the initial examination of the issues submitted for discussion of the sessions, the assistance of the adoption of the decisions of the City Mäslihat and the enforcement of the control functions, the mäslihat includes 4 committees which are:

- Budget, Economy, Industry and Entrepreneurship Issues
- Issues of Legality, Law and Order and Work with the Public
- Construction, Ecology, Transport, Trade and Housing and Communal Services;
- Issues of Social and Cultural Development

Public hearings are conducted in standing committees with the involvement of councillors, executive authorities, associations, the media and people in order to address the most relevant and socially significant issues. In addition, the commissions exercise power over the execution of the decisions of the mäslihat, the programs implemented and other actions of the state authorities and the administration. The standing committees shall be accountable to the mäslihat whom were elected by and are obliged to report their activities yearly. Particular attention shall be paid to the work of councillors with the population at the place of residence. In accordance with current law, the deputies of the mäslihat have an imperative mandate and are obligated to maintain continuous contact with the voters of their electoral district, notify them on a regular basis of the work and the activities of its standing committees and the implementation of the decisions of the mäslihat. Councillors regularly receive voters at their place of residence, who consider their legislative proposals. The procedure for holding the mäslihat sessions, the meetings of its bodies, the establishment and consideration of issues, the composition and election of the mäslihat bodies and other organizational and procedural issues shall be decided by the rules of the mäslihat adopted at the session.

== Current composition ==
The city council (Kokshetau City Mäslihat) of Kokshetau is made up of 17 representatives that are elected every four years. The Kokshetau City Mäslihat governs the city alongside the Akim (Mayor). The 2023 local government elections for Kokshetau City Mäslihat in Kokshetau yielded the following results:

Parties	Number of Representatives
Amanat	10
Aq Jol Democratic Party (Aq Jol)	2
People's Party of Kazakhstan (QHP)	1
Respublica	1
Independent	*3
Total number of members	17

== See also ==
- Mäslihat
