= Zholdybay =

Lake in Kazakhstan

- Жолдыбай
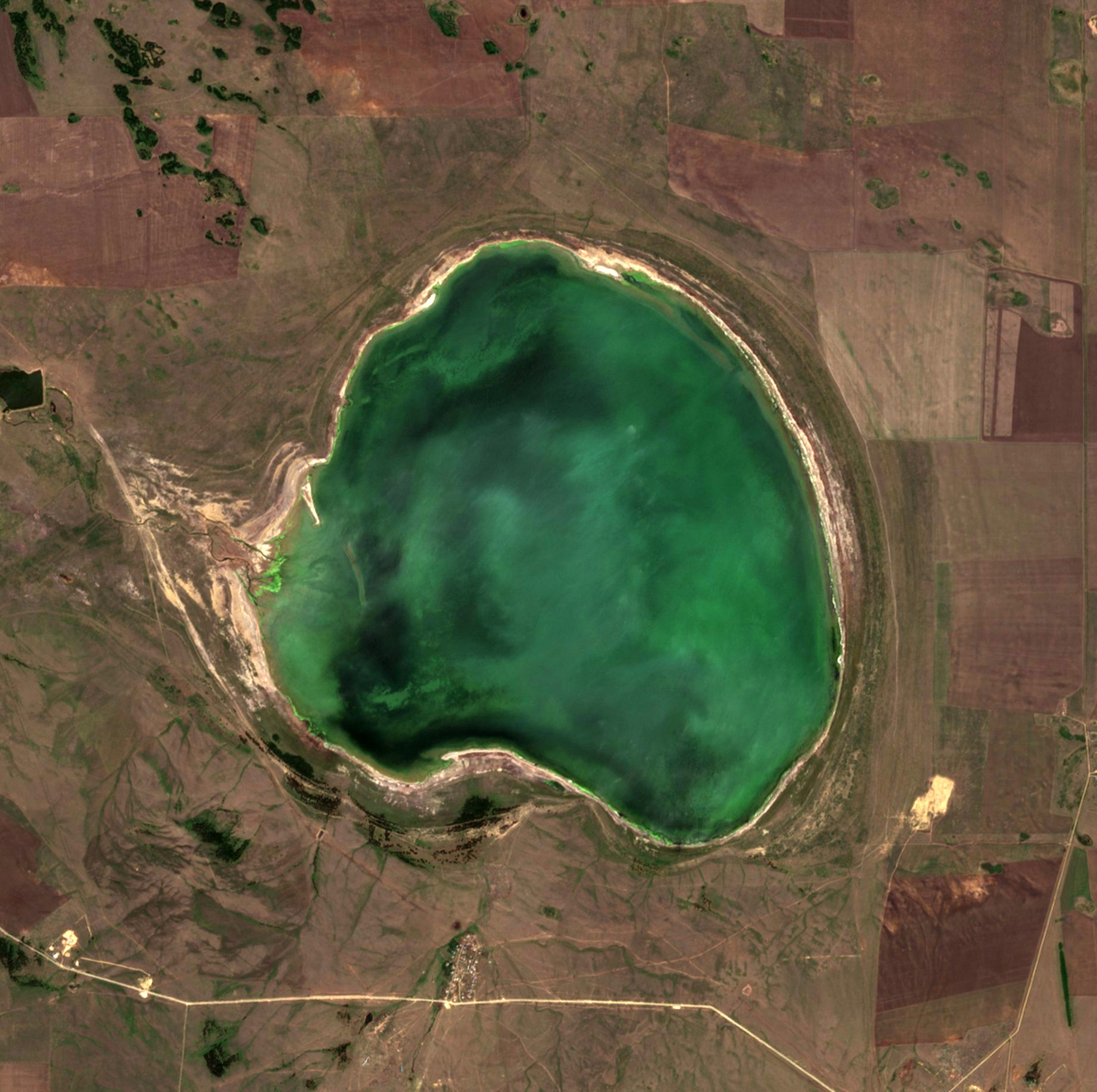
- Sentinel-2 image of the lake

- Location within Kazakhstan
- Location: Kazakh Uplands
- Coordinates: 53°23′49″N 68°57′59″E
- Type: endorheic
- Part of: Kokshetau Lakes
- Primary inflows: Saryozek
- Basin countries: Kazakhstan
- Max. length: 6.8 kilometers (4.2 mi)
- Max. width: 5 kilometers (3.1 mi)
- Surface area: 25.9 square kilometers (10.0 sq mi)
- Residence time: UTC+6
- Surface elevation: 233 meters (764 ft)

Zholdybay (Kazakh: Жолдыбай; Russian: Жолдыбай) is a lake in the Akmola Region, Kazakhstan.

The lake is less than 1 kilometer (0.62 mi) north of Bulak village. Administratively it is part of the Kokshetau City Administration. Zholdybay is used for watering local cattle in the spring.

== Geography ==
Zholdybay lies off to the north of the Kokshetau Lakes and is part of the Ishim basin. Its maximum length is 6.8 kilometers (4.2 mi). The lakeshores are flat and gently sloping, except for the southern and eastern shores where they are rocky, rising to a height of 1.5 meters (4 ft 11 in) to 2.5 meters (8 ft 2 in). Along the shore of the lake there is a wide strip of black silt smelling of hydrogen sulfide.

The Saryozek river flows into the lake from the west. The water of the lake is fresh or slightly brackish. Zholdybay freezes in early November and thaws in late April. The smaller Lake Kopa lies about 20 kilometers (12 mi) to the ESE.

== See also ==
- List of lakes of Kazakhstan
