= Shoshkaly (Akmola Region) =

Lake in Kazakhstan

- Шошқалы
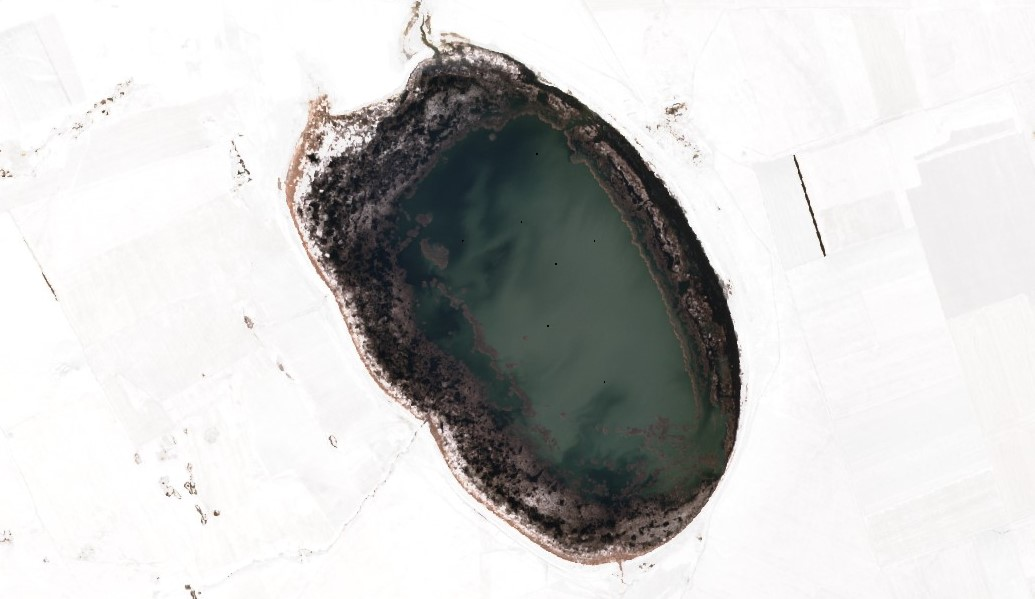
- Sentinel-2 picture of the lake at the end of October.

- Location within Kazakhstan
- Location: Kazakh Uplands
- Coordinates: 52°23′03″N 70°51′10″E
- Type: Salt lake
- Catchment area: 352 square kilometers (136 sq mi)
- Basin countries: Kazakhstan
- Max. length: 6.9 kilometers (4.3 mi)
- Max. width: 4.1 kilometers (2.5 mi)
- Surface area: 22.08 square kilometers (8.53 sq mi)
- Average depth: 1.5 meters (4 ft 11 in)
- Max. depth: 2.2 meters (7 ft 3 in)
- Residence time: UTC+6
- Surface elevation: 311.9 meters (1,023 ft)
- Islands: none
- Settlements: Baimyrza

Shoshkaly (Kazakh: Шошқалы; Russian: Шошкалы) is a salt lake in Akkol and Birzhan sal districts, Akmola Region, Kazakhstan.

The lake is located about 6 kilometers (3.7 mi) southeast of Baimyrza village. The water of the lake is used for local agricultural purposes.

== Geography ==
Shoshkaly is an endorheic lake of the Ishim river basin. It lies at the northern end of the Kazakh Uplands in a tectonic basin at an elevation of 311 meters (1,020 ft). The bottom of the lake is flat and muddy. The mud layer is between 0.6 meters (2 ft 0 in) and 0.8 meters (2 ft 7 in) thick. The lakeshore is flat in the north and the northwest, the other sections are steep, lined with 4.5 meters (15 ft) to 8 meters (26 ft) high cliffs. Among the lakes in its vicinity, Itemgen lies 12 kilometers (7.5 mi) to the east and Mamay 26 kilometers (16 mi) to the northeast.

Shoshkaly has an oval shape oriented in a roughly southeast–northwest direction. The lake reaches its highest level in the spring and its lowest in the summer. It usually freezes to the bottom in the middle of the winter. The mineralization of its waters varies between 800 milligrams per liter (0.00046 oz/cu in) and 1,000 milligrams per liter (0.00058 oz/cu in) in the spring, to between 1,500 milligrams per liter (0.00087 oz/cu in) and 2,000 milligrams per liter (0.0012 oz/cu in) in the summer, and between 3,500 milligrams per liter (0.0020 oz/cu in) and 5,000 milligrams per liter (0.0029 oz/cu in) in the winter when it does not freeze.

== Flora and fauna ==
Lake Shoshkaly is surrounded by steppe vegetation. The basin is flat, with a few low hills rising in the west and southwest. The lakeshore is covered with a 200 meters (660 ft) to 500 meters (1,600 ft) wide belt of reeds. The center of the lake is clear of aquatic plants.

== See also ==
- List of lakes of Kazakhstan
