= Itemgen =

Lake in Kazakhstan

- Итемген
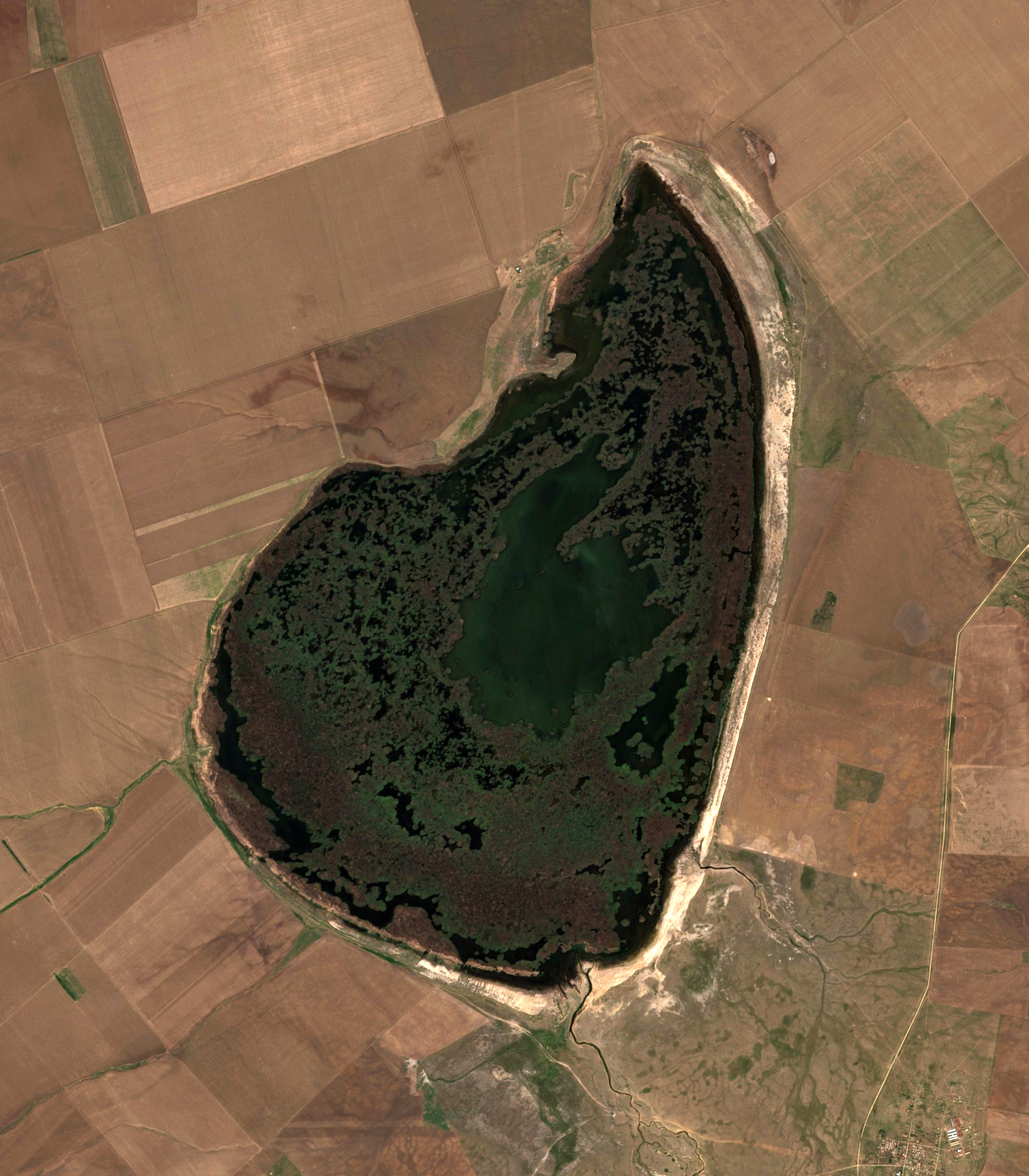
- Sentinel-2 picture of the lake in June.

- Location within Kazakhstan
- Location: Kazakh Uplands
- Coordinates: 52°21′40″N 71°06′30″E
- Type: Salt lake
- Primary inflows: Aksuat
- Catchment area: 1,150 square kilometers (440 sq mi)
- Basin countries: Kazakhstan
- Max. length: 11.5 kilometers (7.1 mi)
- Max. width: 7.4 kilometers (4.6 mi)
- Surface area: 57.4 square kilometers (22.2 sq mi)
- Average depth: 1 meter (3 ft 3 in)
- Max. depth: 3.5 meters (11 ft)
- Water volume: 0.057 cubic kilometers (0.014 cu mi)
- Residence time: UTC+6
- Shore length^{1}: 40.3 kilometers (25.0 mi)
- Surface elevation: 294.6 meters (967 ft)
- Islands: none
- ^{1} Shore length is not a well-defined measure.

Itemgen (Kazakh: Итемген; Russian: Итемген) is a salt lake in Akkol District, Akmola Region, Kazakhstan.

Itemgen is considered a "dead lake" by local people. The town of Stepnogorsk lies about 40 kilometers (25 mi) to the east and Zhalgyzkaragay village (former Priozernoye) 4 kilometers (2.5 mi) to the southeast. The abandoned village of Itemgen is located by the northern lakeshore.

== Geography ==
Itemgen is an endorheic lake of the Ishim river basin. It lies at the northern end of the Kazakh Uplands in a tectonic basin at an elevation of 294 meters (965 ft). The bottom of the lake is flat and muddy. 25 kilometers (16 mi) long river Aksuat flows into the lake from the south. The lakeshore is flat in the east and south, but the western banks are steep. Among the lakes in its vicinity, Shoshkaly lies 12 kilometers (7.5 mi) to the west and Mamay 13 kilometers (8.1 mi) to the north.

Itemgen has an elongated shape oriented in a roughly south–north direction, with the wide southern part tapering towards the north. On average years the highest level is in April and the lowest in September.

== Flora and fauna ==
Lake Itemgen is surrounded by agricultural fields and steppe vegetation. There are muskrats living by the lake.

== See also ==
- List of lakes of Kazakhstan
