= Enbekshilder =

Village in Kazakhstan

Enbekshilder Еңбекшілдер
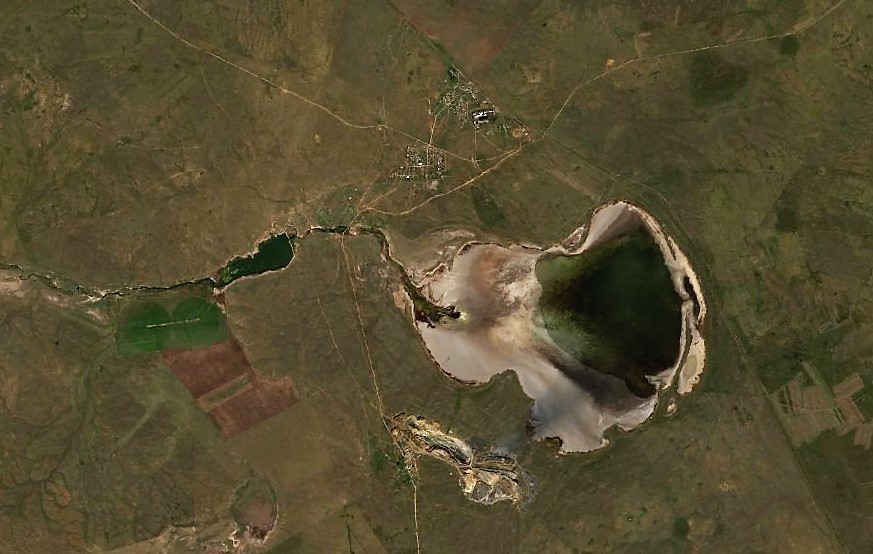
- Enbekshilder to the north of the lake Sentinel-2 image.

- Location in Kazakhstan
- Coordinates: 52°45′56″N 71°30′33″E
- Country: Kazakhstan
- Region: Akmola Region
- District: Birzhan sal District
- Rural District: Enbekshilder Rural District
- Elevation: 226 m (741 ft)

Population (2009)
  - Total: 514
- Time zone: UTC+5
- Postcode: 020704

Enbekshilder (Kazakh: Еңбекшілдер; Russian: Енбекшильдерское) is a settlement in Birzhan sal District, Akmola Region, Kazakhstan. It is the administrative center of Enbekshilder Rural District (KATO code — 114537100). Located in the middle, formerly the district was named Enbekshilder District, but it was renamed "Birzhan sal District" in 2017.

Population: 514 (2009 census results); 513 (1999 census results).

== Geography ==
Enbekshilder is located in the Kazakh Uplands, 1.5 kilometers (0.93 mi) to the north of Atansor lake. Stepnyak town, the district capital, lies 48 kilometers (30 mi) to the northwest, and Atansor village —abolished in 2013— 6 kilometers (3.7 mi) to the south.
