= Kokshetau (city administration) =

Coordinates: 53.2745°N 69.3739°E

Kokshetau City Administration
- Көкшетау қаласы әкімдігі Городская администрация Кокшетау
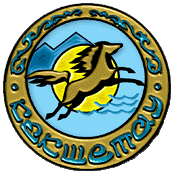
- Seal

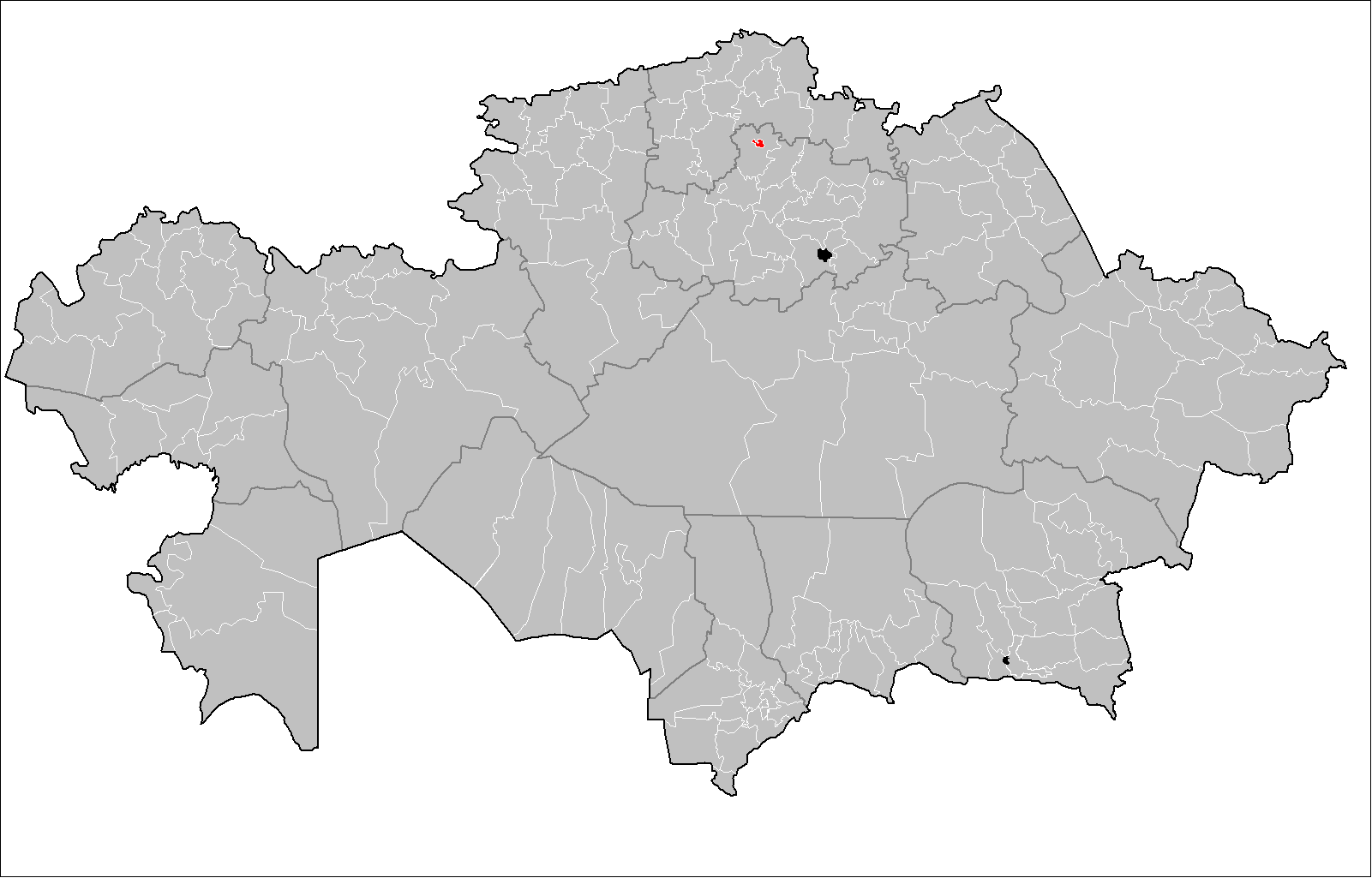
- Country: Kazakhstan
- Region: Akmola Region
- Administrative center: Kokshetau

Area
  - Total: 164 sq mi (425 km^{2})

Population (2022)
  - Total: 165,153
- Time zone: UTC+6 (ALMT)

Kokshetau City Administration (Kazakh: Көкшетау қаласы әкімдігі; Көкшетау Қ.Ә., romanized: Kökşetau qalasy äkımdıgı; Kökşetau Q.Ä., Russian: Городская администрация Кокшетау; город Кокшетау) is an administrative-territorial unit of Akmola Region with the status equal to that of the districts in northern Kazakhstan, one of the two city administrations in the region. It is located in the north of the Akmola Region. The area of the unit is 425 square kilometers (164 sq mi).^{2} The administrative center is Kokshetau. It includes the administrative territorial entities of Kokshetau, Krasny Yar, Stantsyonny, and Kyzylzhulduz. Population: 147,295 (2009 census results); 134,004 (1999 census results).

== Administrative-Territorial Division ==
Kokshetau City Administration includes one settlement administration (which consists of the work settlement of Stantsyonny) and the Krasnoyarsk rural district, which includes two rural settlements (the villages of Krasny Yar and Kyzylzhulduz).

No.	Populated place	Population	KATO ID
1	selo of Krasny Yar	▲9875	111033100
2	p.g.t of Stantsyonny	▲2623	111037100
3	selo of Kyzylzhulduz	▼65	111033300

== Demographics ==
Demographic evolution (city administration)
1970	1979	1989	1999	2004	2005	2006	2007	2008	2009	2010	2011	2012
80,564	104,932	138,814	134,004	135,350	137,492	139,828	141,927	144,233	147,295	148,524	149,901	149,699
2013	2014	2015	2016	2017	2018	2019	2020	2021	2022
152,006	154,000	155,736	159,441	159,945	159,807	159,321	160,431	163,008	165,153
