= Akkol =

Aqköl Ақкөл
- Town
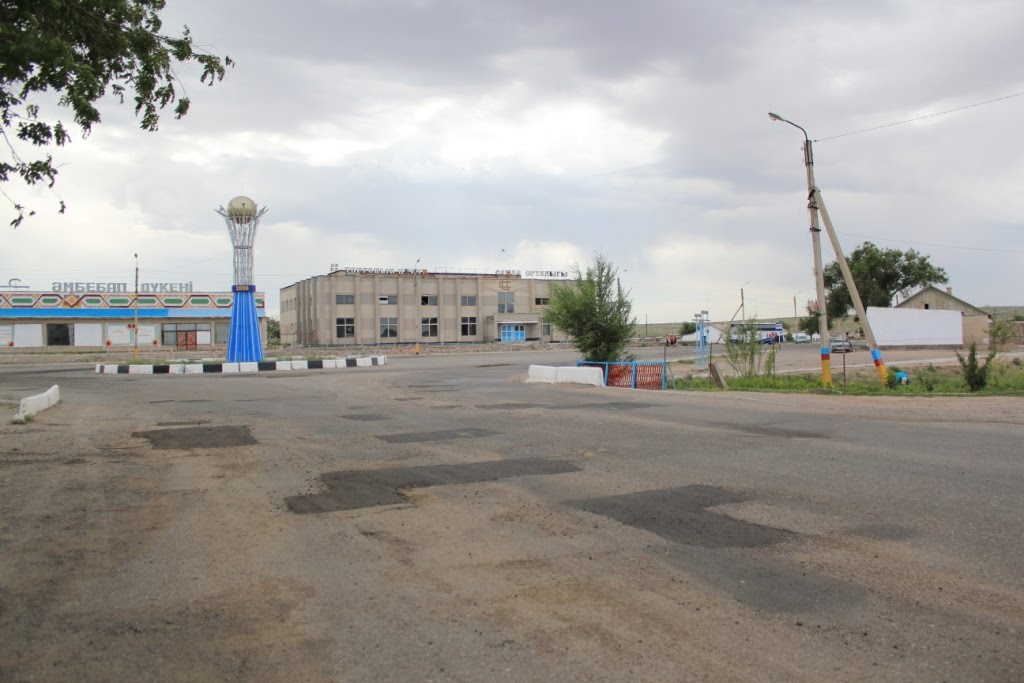
- View of Aqköl

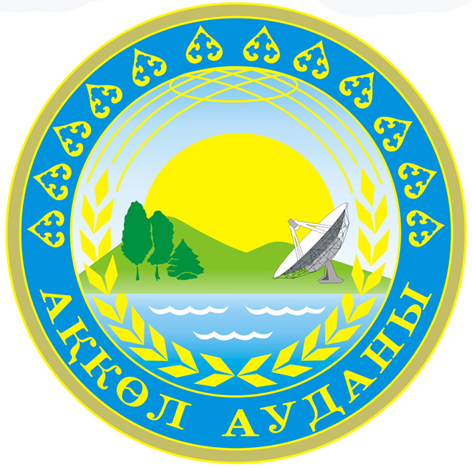
- Seal

- Location within Kazakhstan Location within Asia
- Coordinates: 51°59′44″N 70°56′09″E
- Country: Kazakhstan
- Region: Aqmola Region
- Established: 1887

Government
  - Akim: Yury Kurushin

Area
  - Total: 9,400 km^{2} (3,600 sq mi)
- Elevation: 390 m (1,279 ft)

Population (2009)
  - Total: 14,217
- Time zone: UTC+05:00 (Kazakhstan Time)
- Postal code: 020100
- Area code: +7 71638
- Website: http://akkol.akmol.kz/

Akkol (Kazakh: Ақкөл, Aqköl), formerly known as Alexeyevka (Russian: Алексеевка, until 1997), is a town in northern Kazakhstan. It is located 100 kilometres (62 mi) north of the national capital Nur-Sultan along the highway between Nur-Sultan and the Burabay National Nature Park. The town is the administrative centre of Aqköl District of Aqmola Region. Most of the people are Kazakhs and Russians. There are smaller minorities of Ukrainians and Germans. The population is 14,217 (2009 census results);15,682 (1999 census results).

From its foundation in 1887 till 1997 it had borne the name Alexeyevka. It sits on the western side of a lake of the same name. Thus, it is located between the lake, thick pine forest running to the Russian Federation and a broad plain spreading towards Nur-Sultan. The population of the neighbourhood centre numbers around 14,000 inhabitants. The Kazakh population is around 40%. The rest is composed mostly of the Slavonic people, such as Russians and Ukrainians. Most of the buildings in the town consist of single-storey private houses, though there are also many five-storey buildings in the town. On the western side Aqköl is sheltered by a pine-covered volcano named in Russian Kalancha (Watchtower) and in Kazakh Monshakty (having beads). There is also a ground mission control centre of Kazcosmos inside the pine forest as well as a ski resort named “SharZhum” which accommodates guests and tourists throughout the year on the timber edge. There is also a municipal park in the middle of Aqköl. The town is divided into two parts by a railroad intersected by two curved bridges and one railroad crossing with barrier.

== Climate ==
Climate data for Akkol (1991–2020)
Month	Jan	Feb	Mar	Apr	May	Jun	Jul	Aug	Sep	Oct	Nov	Dec	Year
Mean daily maximum °C (°F)	−10.9 (12.4)	−9.3 (15.3)	−2.0 (28.4)	11.3 (52.3)	20.2 (68.4)	24.9 (76.8)	25.6 (78.1)	24.4 (75.9)	18.0 (64.4)	9.7 (49.5)	−2.1 (28.2)	−8.7 (16.3)	8.4 (47.1)
Daily mean °C (°F)	−15.8 (3.6)	−14.6 (5.7)	−7.2 (19.0)	5.0 (41.0)	13.1 (55.6)	18.2 (64.8)	19.2 (66.6)	17.5 (63.5)	11.0 (51.8)	3.8 (38.8)	−6.4 (20.5)	−13.2 (8.2)	2.6 (36.7)
Mean daily minimum °C (°F)	−20.4 (−4.7)	−19.5 (−3.1)	−12.1 (10.2)	−0.8 (30.6)	5.9 (42.6)	11.2 (52.2)	13.0 (55.4)	10.8 (51.4)	4.6 (40.3)	−1.1 (30.0)	−10.2 (13.6)	−17.4 (0.7)	−3.0 (26.6)
Average precipitation mm (inches)	20.1 (0.79)	16.5 (0.65)	20.3 (0.80)	27.8 (1.09)	33.3 (1.31)	42.1 (1.66)	71.9 (2.83)	40.4 (1.59)	23.7 (0.93)	31.9 (1.26)	28.8 (1.13)	26.5 (1.04)	383.3 (15.09)
Average precipitation days (≥ 1.0 mm)	6.0	5.1	5.8	5.7	6.6	7.3	8.7	6.6	4.8	6.5	7.1	7.5	77.7
Source: NOAA
