= Balykty (Burabay District) =

Lake in Kazakhstan

- Балықты
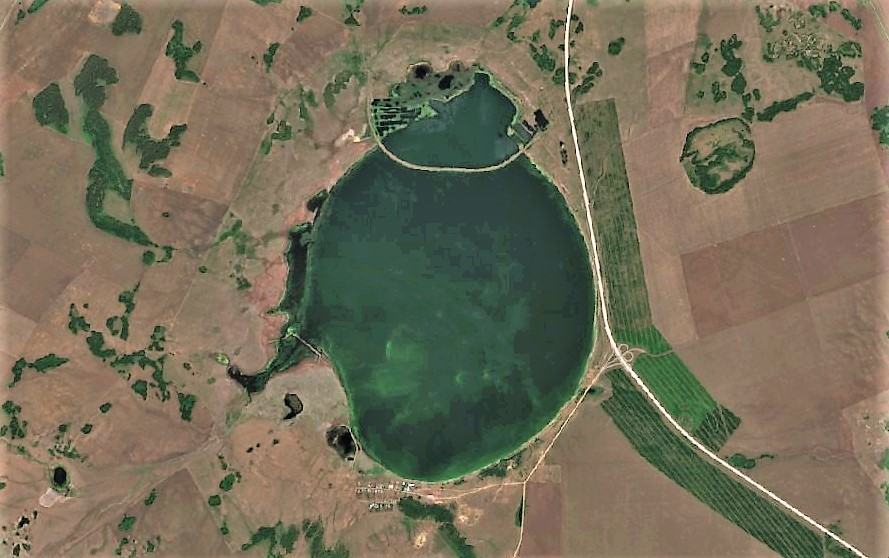
- Sentinel-2 picture of the lake

- Location within Kazakhstan
- Location: Kazakh Uplands
- Coordinates: 52°48′22″N 70°11′04″E
- Type: freshwater lake
- Basin countries: Kazakhstan
- Max. length: 4.9 kilometers (3.0 mi)
- Max. width: 3.9 kilometers (2.4 mi)
- Surface area: 9.29 square kilometers (3.59 sq mi)
- Residence time: UTC+5:00
- Surface elevation: 393 meters (1,289 ft)
- Islands: no
- Settlements: Zharkain

Balykty (Kazakh: Балықты) is a lake in Burabay District, Akmola Region, Kazakhstan.

The village of Zharkain is located by the lakeshore. Shchuchinsk town, the district capital, lies 10 kilometers (6.2 mi) to the north.

== Geography ==
Balykty is located in the Kokshetau Mountains, Kazakh Uplands and is part of the Irtysh basin. It lies at an elevation of 393 meters (1,289 ft). The lake has an oval shape oriented in a roughly north-south direction. The A1 highway passes very close to the eastern shore.

Among the lakes in its vicinity, small lake Kotyrkol lies 19 kilometers (12 mi) to the northeast, Kotyrkol 34 kilometers (21 mi) to the ESE, Zhokey 24 kilometers (15 mi) to the ENE, Shchuchye 14 kilometers (8.7 mi) to the north, Urymkay 12 kilometers (7.5 mi) to the southwest and Kumdykol 15 kilometers (9.3 mi) to the west.

== Flora and fauna ==
Among the birds found in the lake, the black-necked grebe, Terek sandpiper Pallas's gull and pine bunting deserve mention.

== See also ==
- Kokshetau Lakes
- List of lakes of Kazakhstan
