= Kyzylzhulduz, Akmola Region =

Qyzyljūldyz Қызылжұлдыз (Kazakh) Красная Звезда (Russian)
- Village
- Location in Kazakhstan
- Coordinates: 53°21′09″N 69°20′08″E
- Country: Kazakhstan
- Region: Aqmola Region

Population (2009)
  - Total: 65
- Time zone: UTC+6 (ALMT)
- Area code: 7172
- Vehicle registration: C, O, W and 03 (region)

Qyzyljūldyz (Kazakh: Қызылжұлдыз, Qyzyljūldyz) is a village (selo) in Aqmola Region, in northern part of Kazakhstan. The KATO code is 111033300.

== Demographics ==
=== Population ===
Population: 131 (1999 census results). (68 males and 63 females). As of 2009, the population of Qyzyljūldyz was 65 inhabitants (36 males and 29 females).
