= Maloaleksandrovka, Republic of Bashkortostan =

Maloaleksandrovka Малоалександровка
- Selo
- Location within Bashkortostan Location within Russia
- Coordinates: 54°14′N 53°54′E
- Country: Russia
- Region: Bashkortostan
- District: Belebeyevsky District
- Time zone: UTC+5:00

Maloaleksandrovka (Russian: Малоалександровка) is a rural locality (a selo) in Yermolkinsky Selsoviet, Belebeyevsky District, Bashkortostan, Russia. The population was 267 as of 2010. There are 5 streets.

== Geography ==
Maloaleksandrovka is located 25 km northwest of Belebey (the district's administrative centre) by road. Mikhaylovsky is the nearest rural locality.
