= Azat, Kazakhstan =

Azat Азат
- Village
- Location in Kazakhstan
- Coordinates: 43°21′17″N 77°16′03″E
- Country: Kazakhstan
- Region: Almaty Region
- District: Enbekshikazakh District

Population (2009)
  - Total: 5,848
- Time zone: UTC+6 (Omsk Time)
- Postal code: 040406
- Area code: 72775

Azat (Kazakh: Азат, Azat) is a village in Almaty Region of south-eastern Kazakhstan.
