= Umbetaly Karibayev (selo) =

- Village
- Location in Kazakhstan
- Coordinates: 43°15′07″N 76°21′23″E
- Country: Kazakhstan
- Region: Almaty Region
- Time zone: UTC+6 (Omsk Time)

Umbetaly Karibayev is a rural locality (selo) in Zhambyl district of Almaty region of the Republic of Kazakhstan. The selo is the administrative center of Sholakkorgan rural district. Until 1993, it was called the village of Kirovo. It was renamed in honor of the Kazakh aqyn Umbetaly Karibayev (1889-1969).

== Population ==
In 1999, the population of the selo was 2501 people. According to the 2017 population estimate, it had a population of 3,287 people.

== Monuments and museums ==
In 1989, for the 100th anniversary of Umbetaly Karibayev, the literary and memorial Museum of Karibayev was opened. The exhibition consists of the common halls of the Museum and the house-Museum, and is devoted to the life and work of aqyn, as well as his followers and researchers of his work.
