= Stepnyak, Kazakhstan =

Stepnyak Степняк
- Town
- Location within Kazakhstan
- Coordinates: 52°49′59.9″N 70°46′59.9″E
- Country: Kazakhstan
- Region: Akmola Region
- District: Birzhan sal District
- Urban District: Stepnyak City Administration
- Elevation: 366 m (1,201 ft)

Population (2009)
  - Total: 4,268
- Time zone: UTC+5
- Postcode: 020700

Stepnyak (Kazakh: Степняк, Stepniak, Russian: Степняк) is a town in Akmola Region of central Kazakhstan. It is the administrative center of Birzhan sal District and of the Stepnyak City Administration. Population: 4,268 (2009 census results); 5,068 (1999 census results).

== History ==
On February 10, 1934, the Presidium of the All-Russian Central Executive Committee decided: “2. In addition to the already approved resolutions of the Presidium of the All-Russian Central Executive Committee on November 1, 1932 (SU, No. 84, Art. 365) and December 27, 1933 (SU, 1934, No. 3, Art. 18), the settlements of the Kazakh Autonomous Soviet Socialist Republic Arys, Ayagoz, Ilyich and Transform Karsakpai into workers’ settlements and assign them new names; settlement at the Stepnyak mine (in the former Enbekshilder District of Karaganda Region) — to the working village of Stepnyak”.

== Geography ==
Stepnyak is located in the Kazakh Uplands, 5 kilometers (3.1 mi) to the north of Kotyrkol lake and 11 kilometers (6.8 mi) to the east of Zhokey lake.
