= Mamay (lake) =

Lake in Kazakhstan

- Мамай
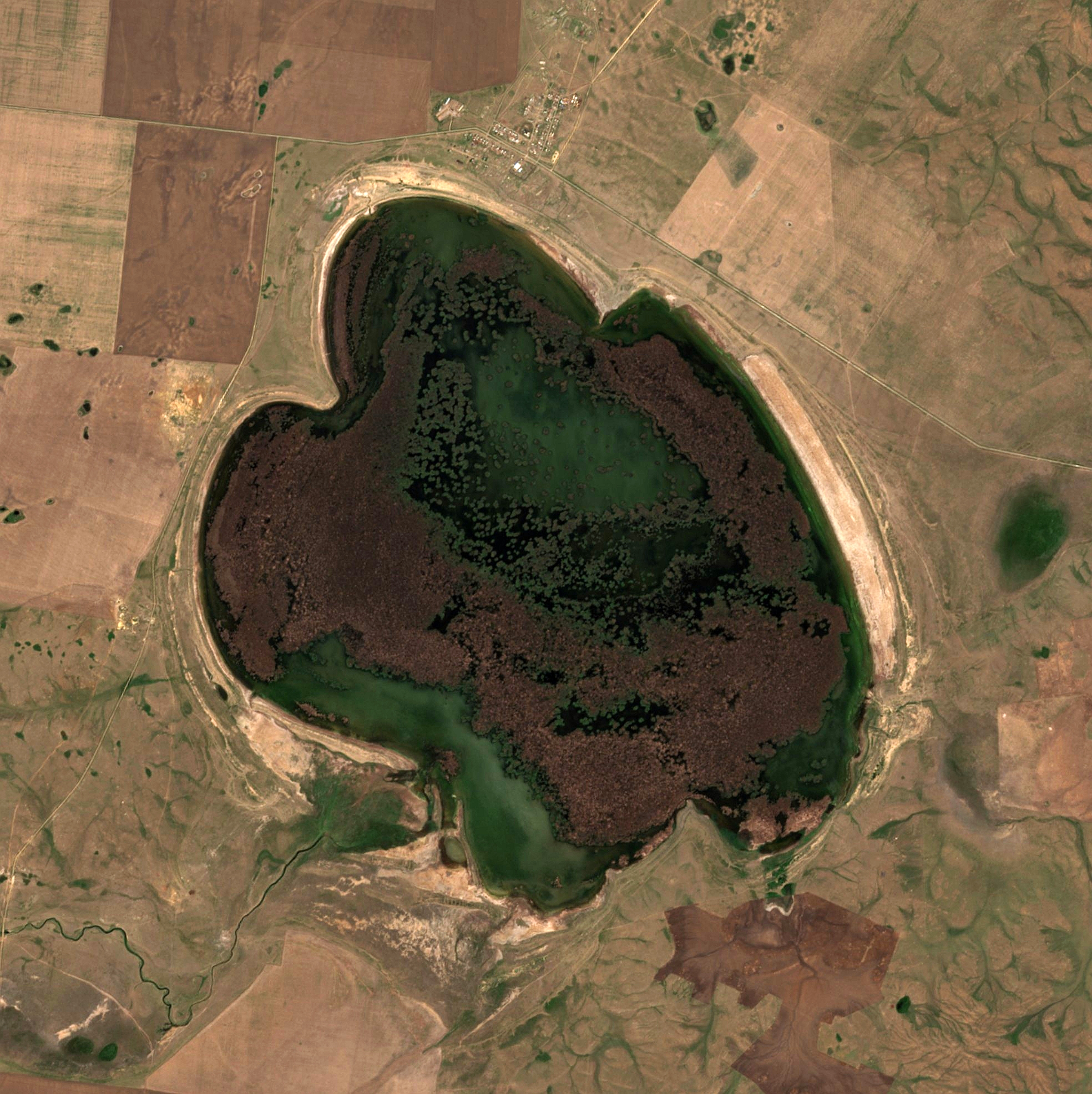
- Sentinel-2 picture of the lake

- Location within Kazakhstan
- Location: Kazakh Uplands
- Coordinates: 52°33′28″N 71°13′01″E
- Type: endorheic lake
- Primary inflows: Tattimbet
- Basin countries: Kazakhstan
- Max. length: 8.5 kilometers (5.3 mi)
- Max. width: 9 kilometers (5.6 mi)
- Surface area: 44.5 square kilometers (17.2 sq mi)
- Average depth: 1.6 meters (5 ft 3 in)
- Residence time: UTC+6:00
- Surface elevation: 277 meters (909 ft)
- Islands: no
- Settlements: Mamay

Mamay (Kazakh: Мамай) is a salt lake in the Akmola Region, Kazakhstan.

The lake straddles the Birzhan sal District in the west and the Akkol District in the east. Mamay village is located by the northern lakeshore. The area surrounding lake Mamay is used for agricultural fields and livestock grazing.

== Geography ==
Mamay is an endorheic lake of the northern end of the Kazakh Uplands. It lies in a basin among low hills at an elevation of 277 meters (909 ft). The Tattimbet river flows into the lake from the southwest.

The lakeshore is gently sloping and sandy except for a steep stretch near the Tattimbet river mouth. The bottom is flat and covered with an approximately 1 meter (3 ft 3 in) thick layer of silt. The water is green and has a bitter taste. Mamay is replenished by rain and snow. Among the lakes in its vicinity, Itemgen lies 13 kilometers (8.1 mi) to the south, Shoshkaly 26 kilometers (16 mi) to the southwest, Atansor 27 kilometers (17 mi) to the northeast and Kotyrkol 33 kilometers (21 mi) to the northwest.

== See also ==
- List of lakes of Kazakhstan
