= Kokshetau Lakes =

Lakes of Kazakhstan

- Көкшетау көлдері
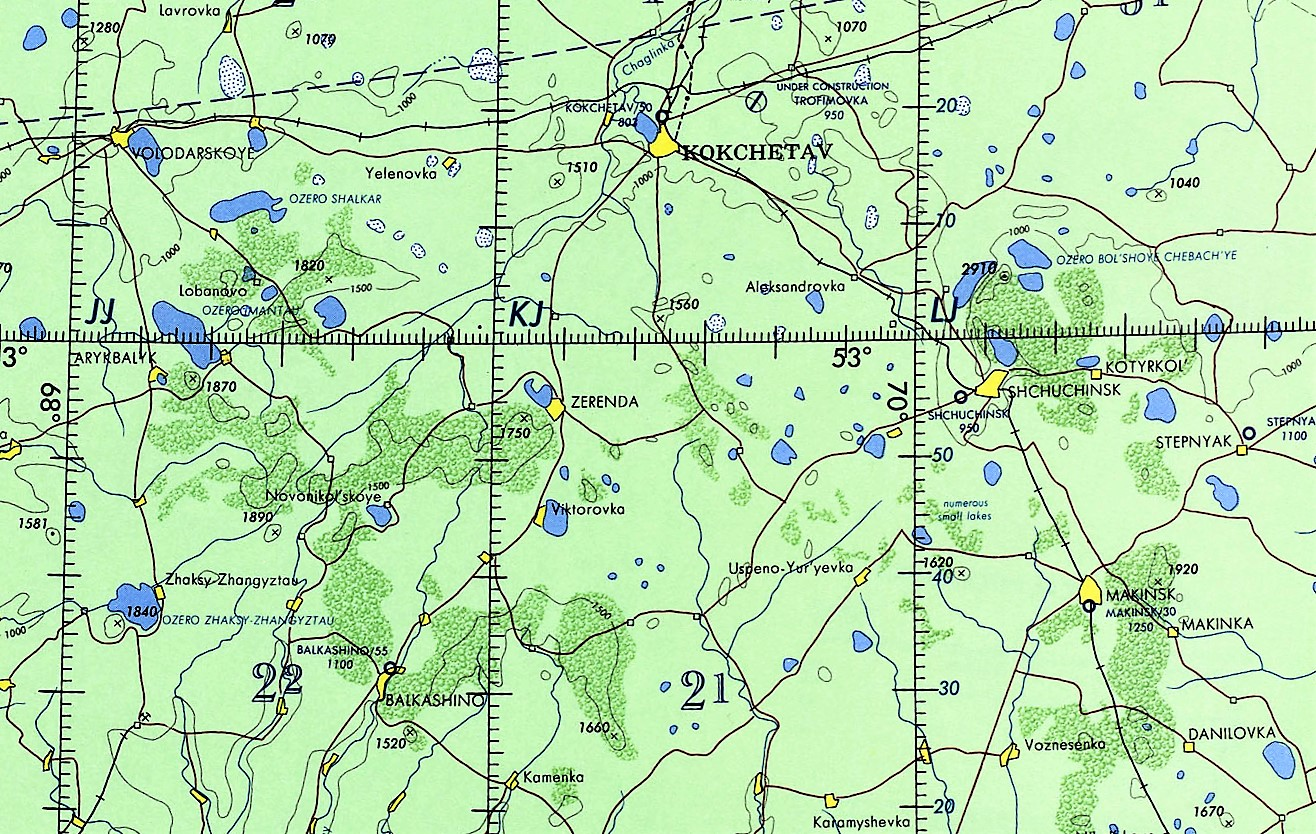
- Kokshetau Lakes area ONC map section

- Location in Kazakhstan

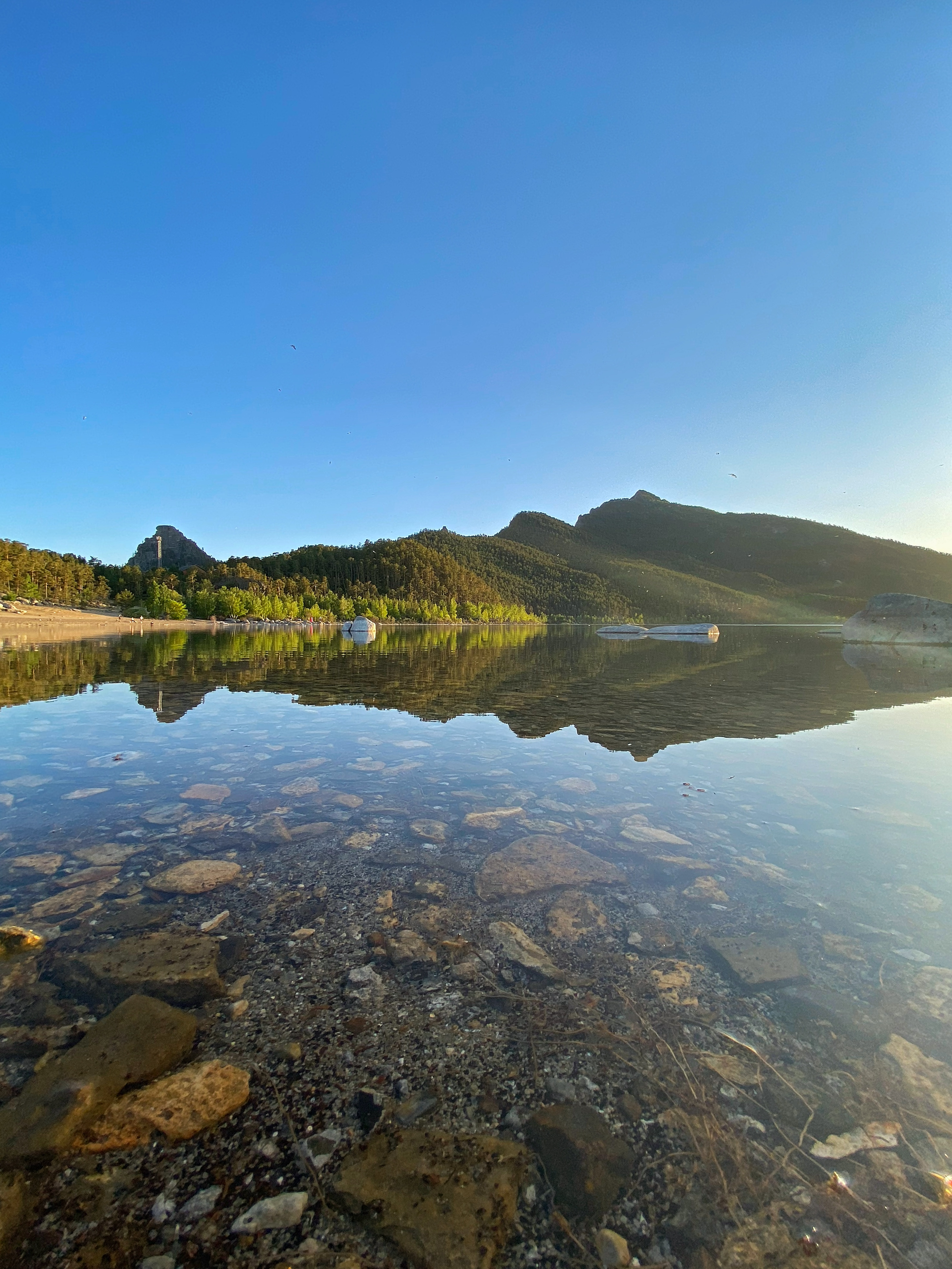
- Panorama of lake Kishi Shabakty
- Location: Kokshetau Hills, Kazakh Uplands
- Coordinates: 53°00′N 70°12′E
- Basin countries: Kazakhstan
- Surface area: 3,434 km^{2} (1,326 sq mi)
- Max. depth: 40 m (130 ft)
- Surface elevation: 200 m (656 ft) to 500 m (1,640 ft)
- Frozen: October to May

Kokshetau Lakes (Kazakh: Көкшетау көлдері) is a group of water bodies in the North Kazakhstan and Akmola regions, Kazakhstan.

The lakes are in a picturesque mountain setting with rocky outcrops and pine forest covered hill slopes. They are one of the main tourist destinations in Kazakhstan, with holiday cottages and resorts near some of them. Burabay spa town is located in the strip of land between lakes Burabay and Ulken Shabakty. The Kokshetau Lakes are part of the Kokshetau National Park and the Burabay National Park protected areas.

== Geography ==
The Kokshetau Lakes lie in the Kokshetau Hills, part of the northeastern sector of the Kazakh Uplands. Most of them are freshwater lakes of tectonic origin located in a rocky zone made of granite. Often the shores are steep and the lakes are comparatively deep. They are fed mainly by snow and don't dry completely, even in periods of drought.

The lake system includes a number of lakes with a total approximate water surface of more than 3,434 km^{2} (1,326 sq mi). The main ones are Burabay, Shchuchye, Ulken Shabakty, Kishi Shabakty, Kotyrkol and Zhokey located in the Kokshetau Massif in the north. Balykty, Urymkay, Karaungir, Zerendi and Aydabul lie in the central part a little further west. Lake Kopa lies next to Kokshetau city, and lakes Shalkar, Arykbalyk, Zhaksy-Zhalgyztau and Imantau are located in the western area. Other lakes are Zholdybay and Ulkensor, as well as Balpashsor, located a little to the north. The latter has foraminiferous mud reputed for its medicinal properties. Ulken Shabakty and Zerendi are the largest of the group and also are having the greatest depths.

== See also ==
- List of lakes of Kazakhstan
