= Stantsyonny, Akmola Region =

Stantsyonny Станционный (Kazakh) Станционный (Russian)
- Village
- Location in Kazakhstan
- Coordinates: 53°21′16″N 69°29′41″E
- Country: Kazakhstan
- Region: Akmola Region

Population (2019)
  - Total: 2,595
- Time zone: UTC+6 (ALMT)
- Area code: 7172
- Vehicle registration: C, O, W and 03 (region)

Stantsyonny (Kazakh: Станционный) is a village (a work settlement) in Akmola Region, in northern part of Kazakhstan. The KATO code is 111037100.

== Demographics ==
=== Population ===
Population: 2,132 (1999 census results). (1018 males and 1114 females). As of 2009, the population of Stantsyonny was 2249 inhabitants (1081 males and 1168 females).
