= Krasny Yar, Akmola Region =

Krasny Yar Қызыл жар (Kazakh) Красный Яр (Russian)
- Village
- Location in Kazakhstan
- Coordinates: 53°19′26″N 69°15′09″E
- Country: Kazakhstan
- Region: Akmola Region

Population (2009)
  - Total: 9,875
- Time zone: UTC+6 (ALMT)
- Postal code: 020010
- Area code: 7172
- Vehicle registration: C, O, W and 03 (region)

Krasny Yar (Kazakh: Қызыл жар, Qyzyl jar) is a village (selo) in Akmola Region, in northern part of Kazakhstan. The KATO code is 111033100.

== Demographics ==
=== Population ===
Population: 8,352 (1999 census results). (3913 males and 4439 females). As of 2009, the population of Krasny Yar was 9875 inhabitants (4704 males and 5171 females).
