= Birzhan sal District =

Coordinates: 52°50′N 70°47′E

Birzhan sal
- District
- Біржан сал ауданы
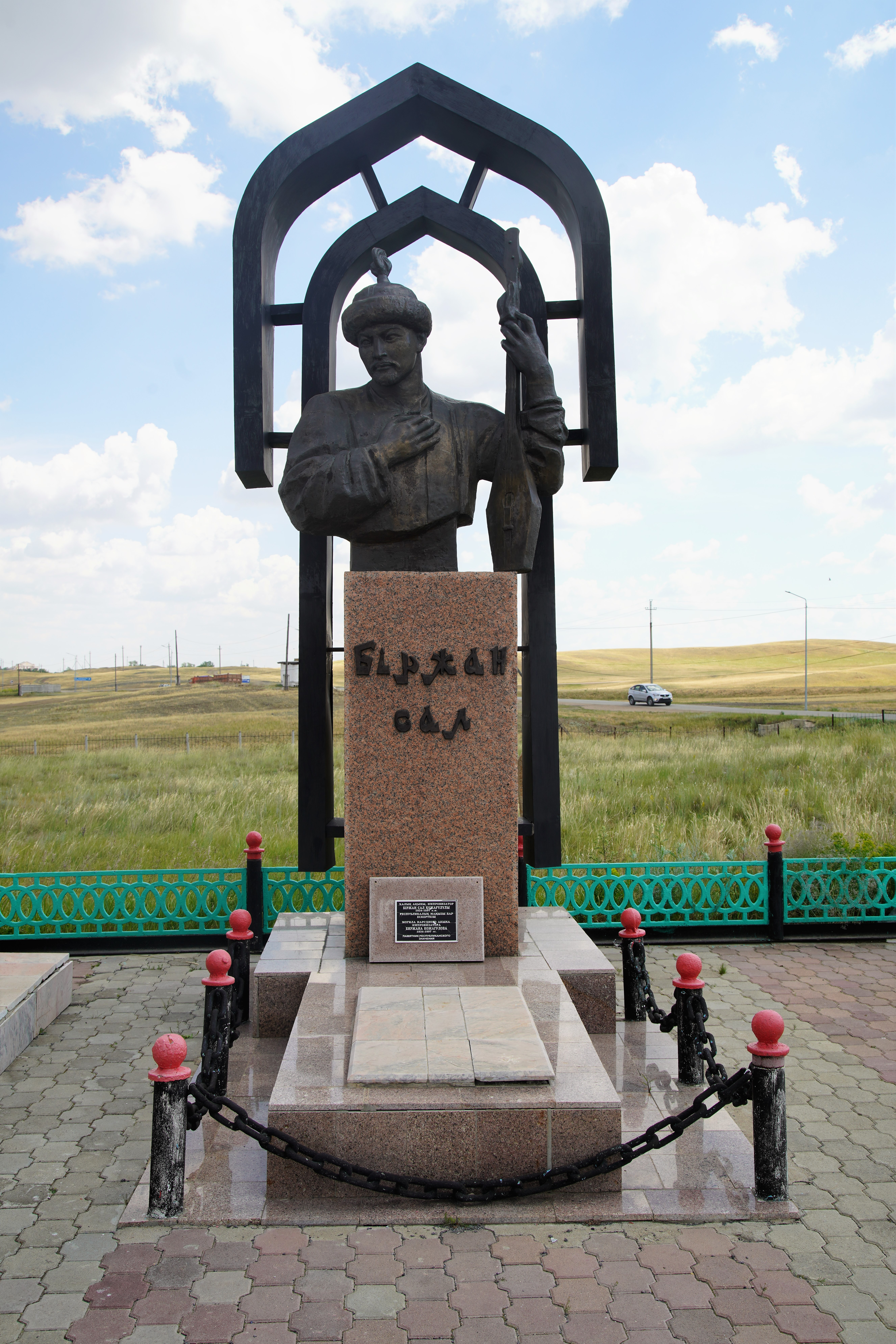
- Birzhan Sal tomb

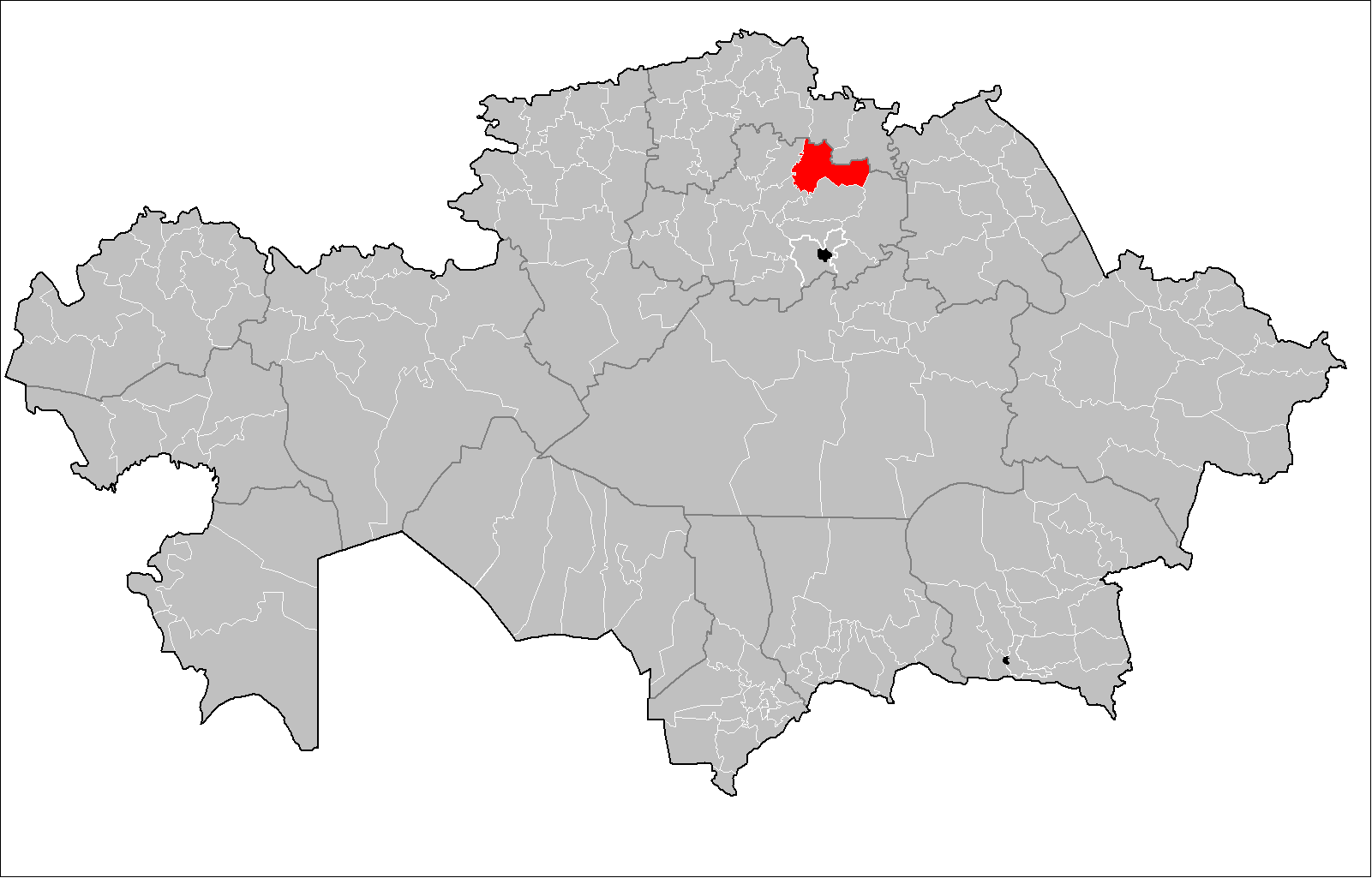
- Country: Kazakhstan
- Region: Aqmola Region
- Administrative center: Stepnyak
- Founded: 1932

Government
  - Akim: Yeszhanov Dostanbek Berikovich

Area
  - Total: 4,200 sq mi (11,000 km^{2})

Population (2013)
  - Total: 16,499
- Time zone: UTC+6 (East)

Birzhan sal District (Kazakh: Біржан сал ауданы) is a district of Akmola Region in northern Kazakhstan. The administrative center of the district is the town of Stepnyak. In 2017, Enbekshilder District was renamed Birzhan sal District. Population: 17,930 (2009 census results); 25,599 (1999 census results).

The district is named after aqyn Birzhan sal.

== Geography ==
Lakes Atansor, Mamay and Shoshkaly are located in the district.
