= Shchuchye (lake) =

Lake in Kazakhstan

Shortandy
- Шортанды / Щучье
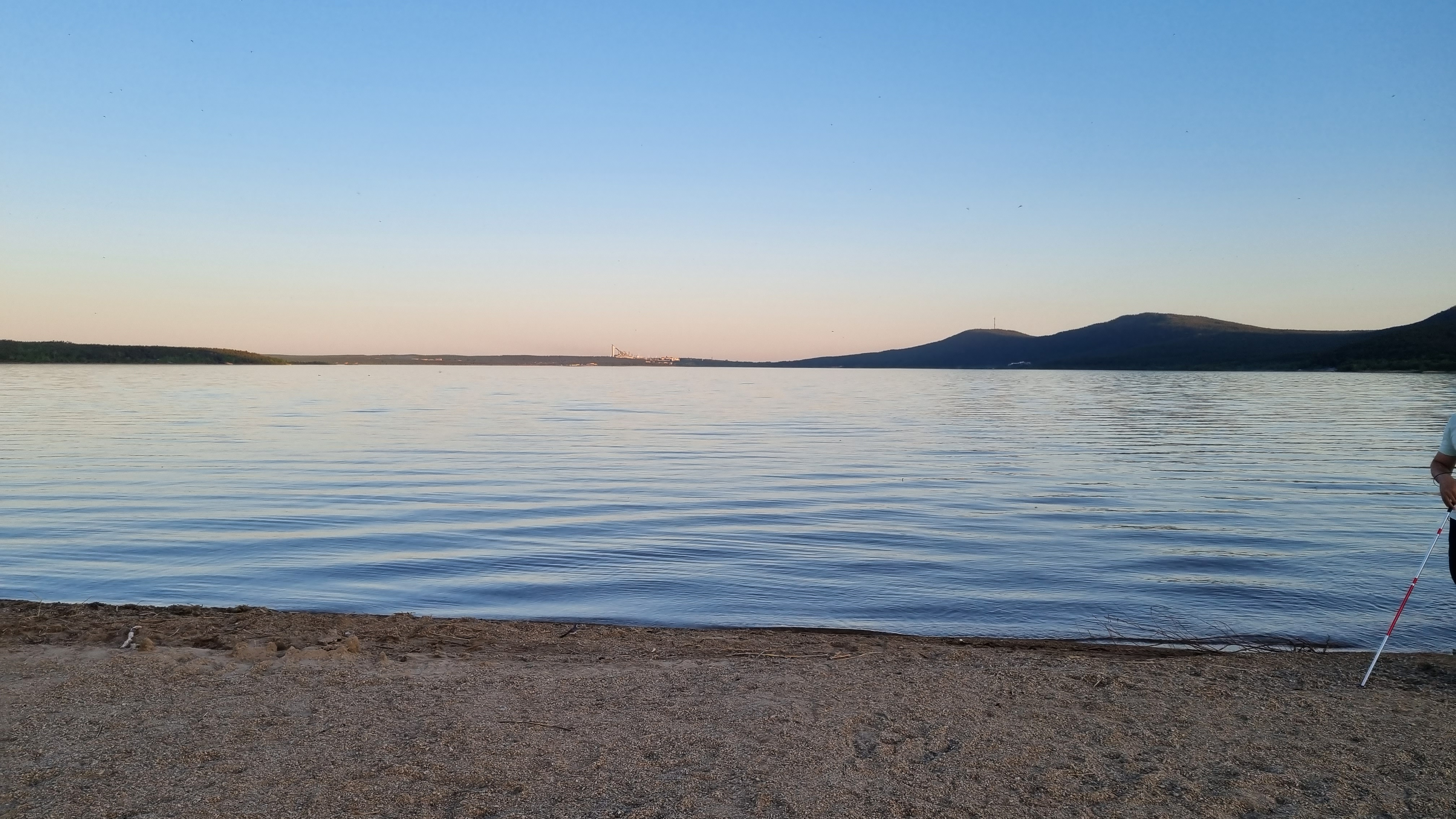
- Panoramic view of the lake

- Location within Kazakhstan
- Location: Kokshetau Hills, Kazakh Uplands
- Coordinates: 52°59′N 70°12′E
- Part of: Kokshetau Lakes
- Basin countries: Kazakhstan
- Max. length: 7.5 kilometers (4.7 mi)
- Max. width: 3 kilometers (1.9 mi)
- Surface area: 18.5 square kilometers (7.1 sq mi)
- Average depth: 5.34 meters (17.5 ft)
- Max. depth: ca 40 meters (130 ft)
- Residence time: UTC+6
- Shore length^{1}: 22 kilometers (14 mi)
- Surface elevation: 395 meters (1,296 ft)
- Settlements: Shchuchinsk
- ^{1} Shore length is not a well-defined measure.

Shortandy (Kazakh: Шортанды; Russian: Щучье) is a lake in Burabay District, Aqmola Region, Kazakhstan.

The name of the lake means "pike", and it was thus named because of the abundance of this fish in its waters. The lake is part of the Burabay National Park, a protected area.

== Geography ==
Shortandy lies in the eastern sector of the Kokshetau Lakes, SSE of lake Kishi Shabakty and SSW of Lake Burabay. It is the deepest lake of the whole group. Its shape is elongated, stretching from NNW to SSE for over 7 kilometers (4.3 mi). There are three small rocky islets by the southwestern shore and one in the northwest. The bottom of the lake is mostly muddy, with a sandy zone in the southwestern part.

Shchuchinsk city lies to the southwest by the lake and was named after russian version it in the 19th century. Burabay spa town 15 kilometers (9.3 mi) to the NNE and lake Balytkty 14 kilometers (8.7 mi) to the south.

== Flora and fauna ==
There are forests close to the lakeshore in most stretches. The native fish species living in the lake are pike, crucian carp, roach, tench and perch. European cisco and peled have been introduced. There may be a population of ninespine stickleback and carp as well.

== See also ==
- List of lakes of Kazakhstan
