= Timiryazevo =

Timiryazevo may refer to

- Timiryazevo, Bagrationovsky District, Kaliningrad Oblast, Russia
- Timiryazevo, Slavsky District, Kaliningrad Oblast, Russia
- Timiryazevo, Vladimir Oblast, Russia
- Timiryazevo, Kamensky District, Voronezh Oblast, Russia
- Timiryazevo, Novousmansky District, Voronezh Oblast, Russia
- Timiryazevo, North Kazakhstan, Kazakhstan

== See also ==
- Timiryazev (disambiguation)
