= Kak (Kishi Kak) =

Lake in Kazakhstan

- Қақ / Кіші Қақ
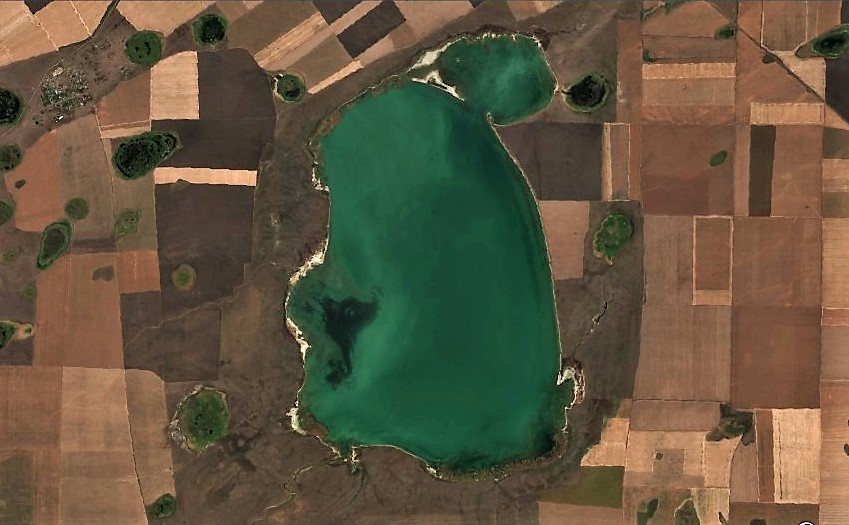
- Sentinel-2 image of the lake

- Location within Kazakhstan
- Location: Ishim Plain; West Siberian Plain
- Coordinates: 53°45′51″N 66°49′23″E
- Basin countries: Kazakhstan
- Max. length: 9 kilometers (5.6 mi)
- Max. width: 6.1 kilometers (3.8 mi)
- Surface area: 45.1 square kilometers (17.4 sq mi)
- Average depth: ca 1 meter (3 ft 3 in)
- Residence time: UTC+6
- Shore length^{1}: 37.6 kilometers (23.4 mi)
- Surface elevation: 156.5 meters (513 ft)
- ^{1} Shore length is not a well-defined measure.

Kak (Kazakh: Қақ; Russian: Как), also known as Kishi Kak (Kazakh: Кіші Қақ), is a salt lake in Timiryazev District, North Kazakhstan Region, Kazakhstan.

The lake lies 40 kilometers (25 mi) to the WSW of Sergeyev town. Timiryazevo town, the administrative center of the district, lies 20 kilometers (12 mi) to the west of the lake.

== Geography ==
Kak lies in a shallow depression to the west of the Ishim, in an area of scattered lakes at the southern limits of the West Siberian Plain. The lake is slightly elongated, stretching roughly from north to south, with a small round bay in the northeast. It is quite shallow and its bottom is flat. The middle of the lake has a maximum depth of a little over 1 meter (3 ft 3 in). The water of the lake is salty and bitter.

Although it is not much smaller, the lake is also known as "Little Kak" in order to differentiate it from Kak (Ulken Kak) lake located 38 kilometers (24 mi) to the WSW in the same district. The Sergeyev Dam lies 24 kilometers (15 mi) to the east and lake Zhaltyr 37 kilometers (23 mi) to the northeast.

== Fauna ==
Kishi Kak used to lie in a forest steppe zone, but presently it is largely surrounded by cultivated fields. The lake is visited every summer and autumn by waterbirds and waders, including large flocks of the red-breasted goose.

== See also ==
- List of lakes of Kazakhstan
