= Pyotr Gerankov =

Russian serial killer

- Born: Pyotr Evgenievich Gerankov; 12 January 1964 (age 62); Imantav, Arykbalyk, Kokshetau Oblast, Kazakh SSR, USSR
- Years active: 1981; 1995
- Conviction: Murder x10
- Penalty: Short imprisonment (1981); Death penalty, commuted to life imprisonment (1996)

Details
- Country: Russia
- States: Sergeyev (Kazakh SSR), Omsk, Omsk Oblast
- Date apprehended: October 17, 1995
- Imprisoned at: White Swan

Pyotr Evgenievich Gerankov (Russian: Пётр Евгеньевич Геранков; born 12 January 1964) is a Russian serial killer and burglar who committed ten robbery-related murders in Omsk and its environs, as well as in Kazakhstan. He was sentenced to death, but due to a moratorium, the sentence was commuted to life imprisonment. In three murders, Gerankov's wife, Lyudmila, was an accomplice to the crimes.

== Early life ==
Very little is known about the childhood and youth of Pyotr Gerankov. Gerankov was brought to criminal responsibility for the first time at the age of 17 in 1981 for murder and robbery, for which he was sentenced to a short term as a minor. Soon after his release, he was tried again, this time for robbery. Having served his second term, after returning from prison, Gerankov married a certain Lyudmila, and a child was born in the marriage. The couple rented housing in the city of Sergeyev in the North Kazakhstan Region.

== Murders ==
In the 1990s, due to the collapse of the Soviet Union, the Gerankov family began to experience financial difficulties. The Gerankovs decided to move to Lyudmila's relatives in Omsk. There was no money for the move, and Pyotr tried to beg it from the landlady. She refused to help him with finances, for which she was killed by blows to the head with a blunt hard object. Pyotr robbed the apartment and tried to destroy evidence of the crime, setting up the murder to look like an accident—when leaving, he left the electric heater on, but the neighbors quickly put out the fire and discovered the body of the murdered woman. It was not possible to catch Gerankov in hot pursuit; on the same day, using the money found in the apartment, he and his wife left for Omsk.

Between March and 3 October 1995, Pyotr Gerankov committed eight more murders and robberies in the private sector of the Leninsky District of Omsk. All victims were single elderly people aged from 63 to 90 years (seven women and one man). He looked for pensioners by contacting local residents, called himself a refugee from Kazakhstan or coming from Petropavlovsk, and said that he was looking for housing. The victims were killed by blows to the head with a blunt object or an ax. Often his prey had small amounts of money, useless and low-value objects, as well as food. Sometimes he even left empty-handed, which indicated that it was not only self-interest that motivated him to kill. For the first murders, he took his wife with him, who was involved in stealing things from the victims' houses.

Pyotr committed the third murder in March 1995. Under the pretext of looking for housing, he asked an elderly woman for an address where he could rent an apartment, and the next day he came to her with a hammer and killed the pensioner with blows to the head. He found about a million rubles in the apartment. In addition to money, Gerankov stole clothing, boots, military medals, and food from the refrigerator. On 27 July, Gerankov used an ax to kill 64-year-old pensioner Shishkova, who lived in her own house on Ozernaya Street. He only stole her earrings. Gerankov committed the next murders on 31 August. The victims were 84-year-old and 85-year-old women who lived in their private houses on Rabochy Lane. Both died from chopped head wounds. Gerankov did not steal anything from the apartment of the first murdered woman, but in the house of the second he found 800 thousand rubles and a cheap pocket watch. Two weeks later, Gerankov committed the seventh murder. On 18 September, a 70-year-old man was hacked to death in a private house, from whom Gerankov took only a Comet tape recorder and a pack of ground beef. The next day, 80-year-old Vnorovskaya, from whom nothing was stolen, was killed with an ax and a tire iron. Pyotr Gerankov committed his last murder on 3 October 1995, two weeks after the murder of Vnorovskaya. The victim was once again a 90-year-old pensioner who lived in her own house on the outskirts of Omsk. The targets included products from the refrigerator, minced meat and a Tetris game.

== Arrest, investigation and trial ==
To solve the murders, which were quickly combined into one series, an investigative and operational group was created. As it turned out, there were a large number of witnesses in the case, local residents who reported to the police about a suspicious person walking aimlessly along the city streets and asking about elderly people, but this information did not help the investigation. First of all, persons who had previously been convicted, were registered at a psychoneurological dispensary, and led an antisocial lifestyle were checked. In the house of the last murdered woman, Gerankov was seen by a young woman who gave investigators a detailed verbal portrait of the suspect. The killer was detained based on an identikit on 17 October at the railway station in Omsk. The detainee's fingerprints were taken, and they matched those found at the crime scenes. Almost immediately Gerankov confessed to everything, and also spoke about his wife's complicity in three murders. The stolen belongings of the murdered people were found in Gerankov's apartment. On 6 December 1996, Pyotr Gerankov was sentenced to death by firing squad, which was later commuted to life imprisonment. His wife, Lyudmila Gerankova, was sentenced to five years in prison and confiscation of property. Pyotr Gerankov was sent to serve his sentence in the special regime correctional colony "White Swan" in the city of Solikamsk, Perm Krai.

== See also ==
- List of Russian serial killers
