= Kishi Torangyl =

Brackish lake in Kazakhstan

- Кіші Тораңғыл
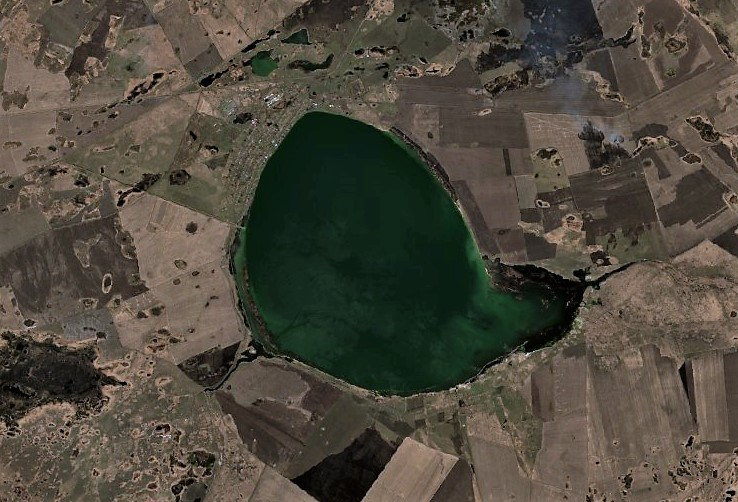
- Sentinel-2 image of the lake

- Location within Kazakhstan
- Location: Kazakh Uplands
- Coordinates: 53°42′30″N 67°47′55″E
- Type: endorheic
- Primary outflows: none
- Catchment area: 970 square kilometers (370 sq mi)
- Basin countries: Kazakhstan
- Max. length: 6.4 kilometers (4.0 mi)
- Max. width: 5 kilometers (3.1 mi)
- Surface area: 25.5 square kilometers (9.8 sq mi)
- Max. depth: 4.9 meters (16 ft)
- Water volume: 0.0089 cubic kilometers (0.0021 cu mi)
- Residence time: UTC+6
- Shore length^{1}: 18.4 kilometers (11.4 mi)
- Surface elevation: 179.2 meters (588 ft)
- Islands: none
- Settlements: Novopokrovka and Beloglinka
- ^{1} Shore length is not a well-defined measure.

Kishi Torangyl (Kazakh: Кіші Тораңғыл; Russian: Малый Тарангул) is a brackish lake in Shal akyn District, North Kazakhstan Region, Kazakhstan.

The lake is located 25 kilometers (16 mi) to the southeast of Sergeyev town, the administrative center of the district. Novopokrovka lies by the northwestern lakeshore and Beloglinka close to the southern end.

== Geography ==
Kishi Torangyl is an endorheic lake belonging to the Ishim River basin. It is located at the northern edge of the Kazakh Uplands. There is a small bay in the southern part of the eastern shore. The lake bottom is flat and is covered by a 0.1 meters (3.9 in) to 0.3 meters (1 ft 0 in) thick layer of silt.

The lake is largely surrounded by agricultural fields. The Sergeyev Dam lies 25 kilometers (16 mi) to the west.

== Flora and fauna ==
There are many types of algae and nineteen species of fish in the waters of Kishi Torangyl. The lake is important for local fisheries.

== See also ==
- List of lakes of Kazakhstan
