= Imanburlyk =

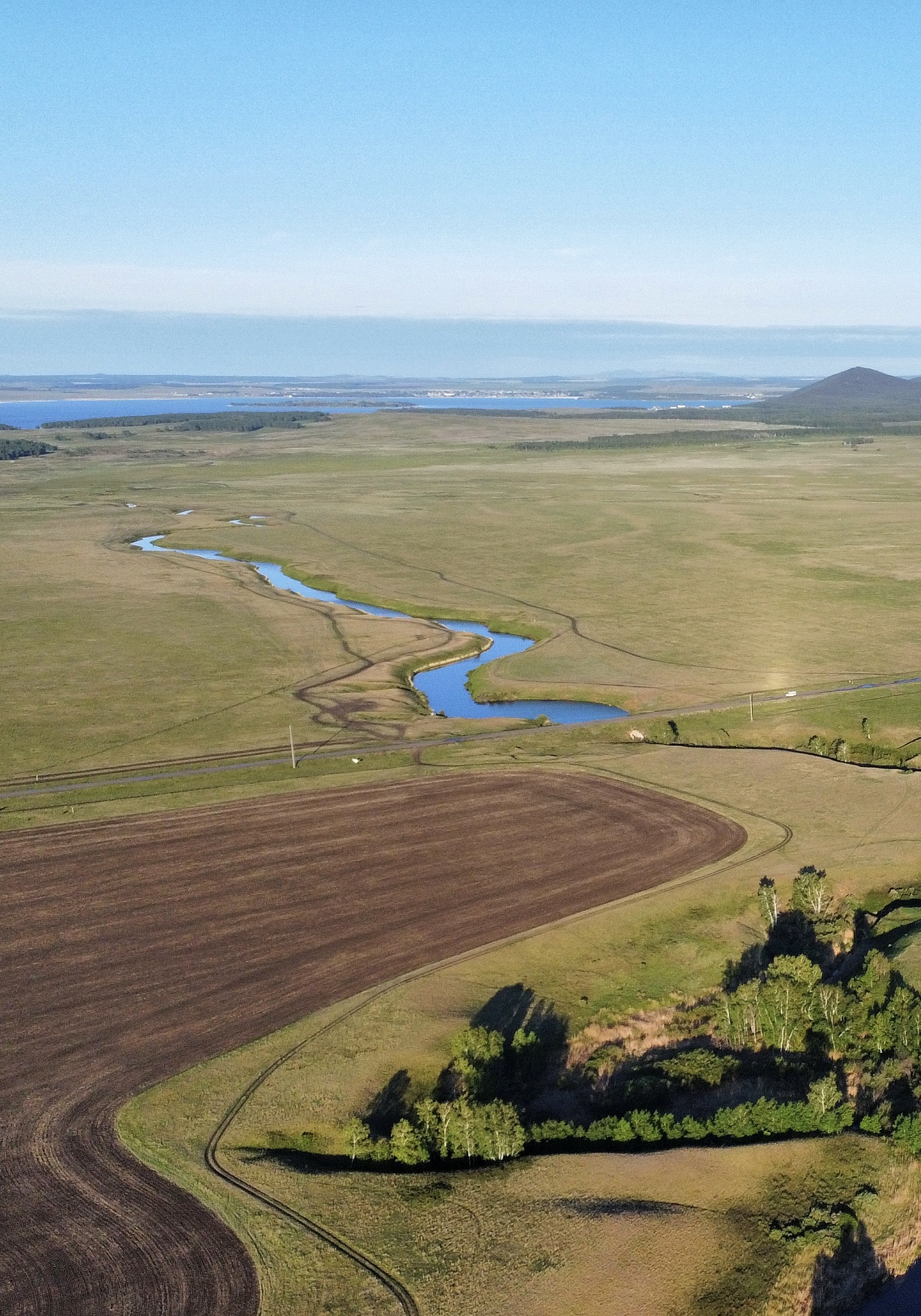
- Last stretch of the river course and Sergeyev Dam in the distance

Location
- Country: Kazakhstan

Physical characteristics
- Source
  - location: Imantau (lake)
- Mouth: Ishim
  - coordinates: 53.6639°N 67.2411°E
- Length: 177 km (110 mi)

Basin features
- Progression: Ishim→ Irtysh→ Ob→ Kara Sea

The Imanburlyk (Kazakh: Иманбұрлық, İmanbūrlyq) is a river of the North Kazakhstan Region, Kazakhstan. It is a right tributary of the Ishim.

== Course ==
The river has its origin in lake Imantau. It flows in a roughly north/northwestern across the Aiyrtau and Shal Akyn districts of North Kazakhstan. Its mouth is in the right bank of the Sergeyev Dam, near Kenes village.
