= Merchant Ruchkin's House, Petropavl =

- Дом купца Ручкина
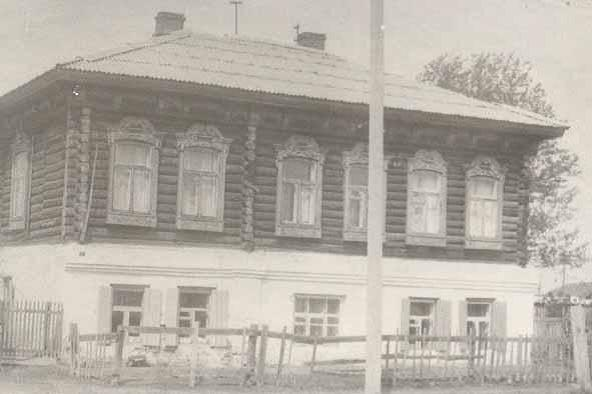

General information
- Status: Monument of Culture
- Location: Petropavl
- Country: Kazakhstan
- Completed: the end of the 19th century

Design and construction
- Architect(s): Baroque

The Merchant Ruchkin's House is located along Krupostnaya street, 52, Petropavl, North Kazakhstan Region.

== History ==
The house was built in the late 19th century by the merchant Ivan Egorovich Ruchkin. In 1925 it housed the 4th Soviet‘s school for 280 students. In the late 1920s, the house was municipalized and handed over to the communal economy.

== Architecture ==
The house is a two-story building. The first floor is made of brick, and the second story is made of logs. The facades of the building are decorated with carved plat bands on the windows of the second floor and carved wooden cornices on the contour of the whole house. Later, changes were made to the yard facades. The building is an example of the historical layout of the provincial merchant city, typical of the 19th century, expressed in the planned integrated development of the residential areas of the mountainous part of the city.

== Literature ==
- ГАСКО. Ф.3037. Инв. № 3224.
