= Kak =

Kak or KAK may refer to:

== People ==
- Ram Chandra Kak (1893–1983), Indian politician, chief minister of Jammu and Kashmir
- Amar Nath Kak (1889–1963), Indian writer, brother of Ram
- Siddharth Kak, Indian film and television director
- Subhash Kak, Indian computer scientist

== Other ==
- Kak (title)
- Kak (surname)
- Kak (commune), Bar Kaev, Cambodia
- Kak (band)
- Kak, a South African slang word
- Royal Automobile Club (Sweden)
- Football Association of Greenland (Kalaallit Nunaanni Isikkamik Arsaattartut Kattuffiat in Greenlandic)
- Kak (Kishi Kak), a lake in Kazakhstan
- Kak (Ulken Kak), a lake in Kazakhstan
- Kugelamphoren-Kultur, an archaeological culture in Europe

== See also ==
- Kaak (disambiguation)
