= Petropavl water tower =

- Водонапорная башня
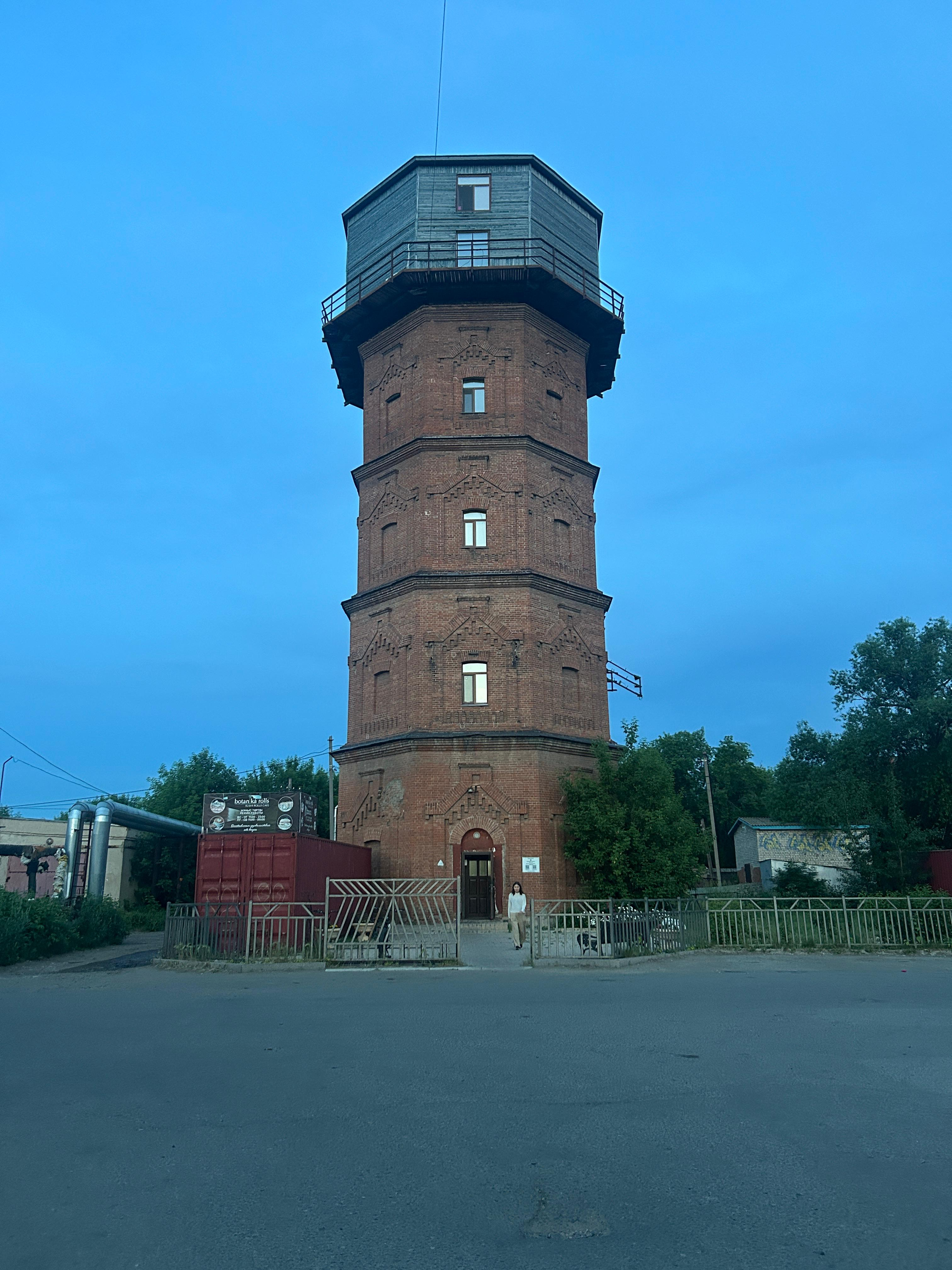

General information
- Status: Monument of Culture
- Location: Petropavl, Republic of Kazakhstan
- Completed: 1902

Design and construction
- Architect: Baroque

The Petropavl water tower is located at the corner of Brusilovskogo street and Amangeldy street in Petropavl, Republic of Kazakhstan. It is a sample of the water supply system for the city from the early twentieth century.

== Construction ==
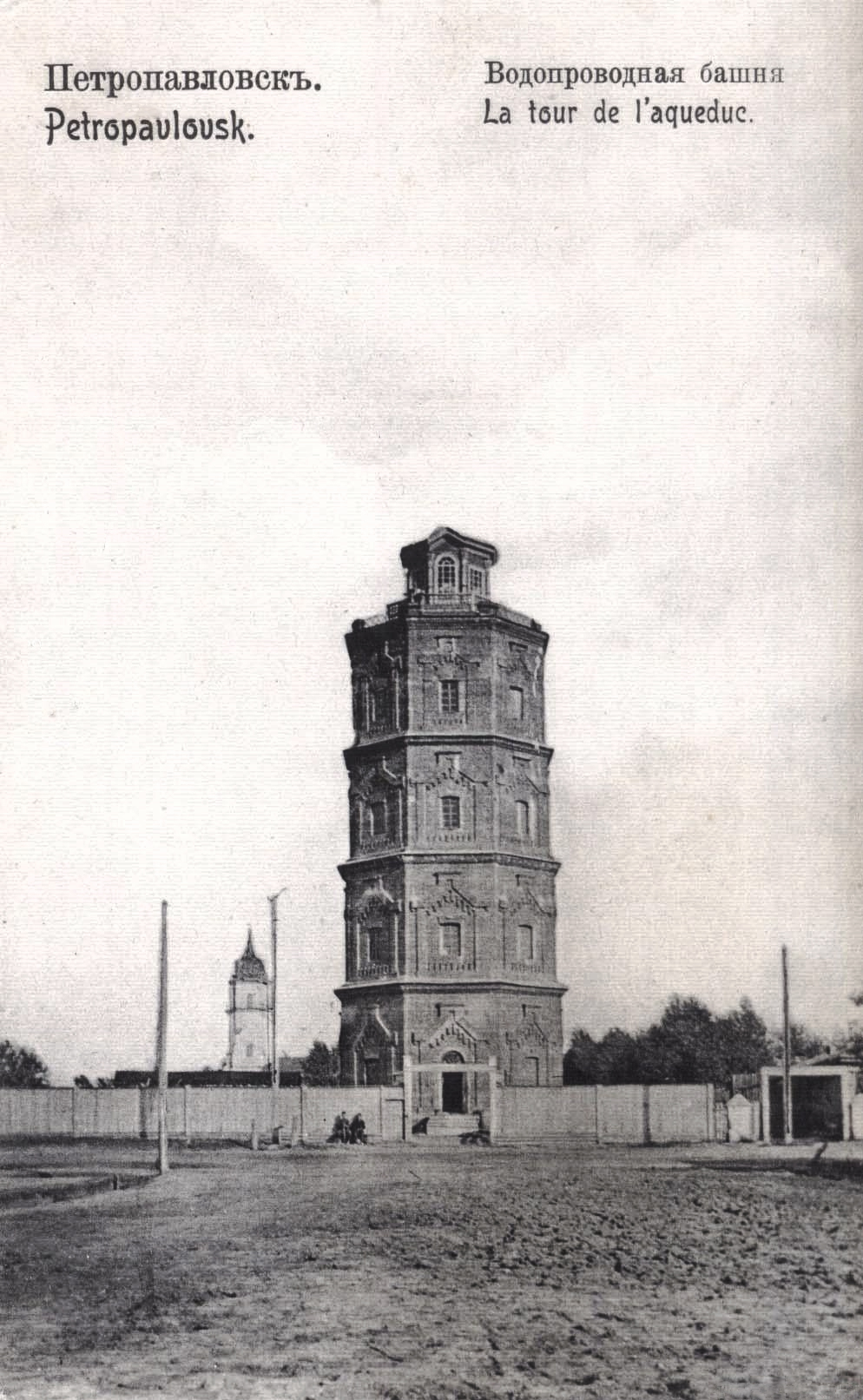
Petropavl water tower. 1902

The construction of the city water main started in 1901, while the construction of the water tower began in 1902. The construction of the water pipe is based on the task of servicing the city in case of a fire. The water supply was pressure-diluting, in which the central tower served as a reserve tank, and, in practice, was not used as a water distributor. Until the 1990s, the water tower was used to provide a reserve water reserve for the city's water supply and sewerage in case of fire or danger.

== Architecture ==
The tower is constructed of brick with an octagonal form, It consists of five tiers connected by an internal staircase located along the walls. The entrance to the water tower is at the ground level. The interior space is illuminated through the window openings. The upper tier of the tower is lined with a wooden strip and has a walkway observation deck.

== Literature ==
- ГАСКО. Ф. 3037. Инв. № 825.
- Северо-Казахстанская область. Энциклопедия. Алматы. 2004. Cс. 435-437.
