= Timiryazev =

Timiryazev (Russian: Тимиря́зев; masculine) or Timiryazeva (Russian: Тимиря́зева; feminine) is a Turkic Russian last name. It may refer to:

== People ==
- Arkady Timiryasev (1880-1955), Soviet physicist and philosopher, and son of Kliment Timiryazev
- Dmitri Timiryasev (1837–1903), Russian specialist in statistics and brother of Kliment Timiryazev
- Kliment Timiryazev (1843–1920), Russian botanist and physiologist
- Nikolai Timiryasev (1835–1906), Russian military officer and brother of Kliment Timiryazev
- Vasily Timiryazev (1841–1912), Russian journalist and brother of Kliment Timiryazev
- Vasily Timiryazev (statesman) (1849–1919), Russian Minister of Trade and Industry in Pyotr Stolypin's Cabinet

== Other uses ==
- Timiryazev (crater), a lunar crater named after Kliment Timiryazev
- Timiryazev, Azerbaijan
- Timiryazeva, the administrative center of Timiryazevskoye Rural Settlement, Maykopsky District, Russia
- Timiryazev District, North Kazakhstan Region, Kazakhstan
- Timiryazev Prize, awarded by the Russian Academy of Sciences
- 6082 Timiryazev, a minor planet
- Russian State Agricultural University (also known as the Timiryazev Academy), named after Kliment Timiryazev

== See also ==
- Timiryazevo (disambiguation)
- Timiryazevsky (disambiguation)
