= Mazaev mill, Petropavl =

- Здание мельницы Мазаева
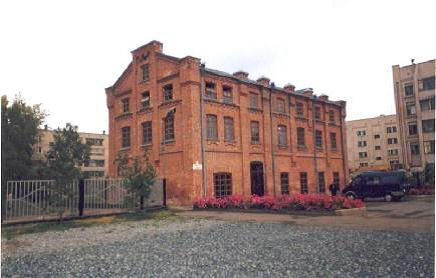

General information
- Status: Monument of Culture
- Architectural style: Baroque
- Location: Petropavl
- Country: Kazakhstan
- Completed: 1913

Mazaev Mill was constructed by Gavreel Ivanovich Mazaev in 1913. The area of this mill was marshland so the building has caved in. In 1917, before the revolution, the mill was bought by two owners, Pinekir and Abramov. During the Soviet era, the building was nationalized and until 1978, [was used for?] flour mill production. At the present time this pendulum is transferred to one of the Catholic church currents.

== Architecture ==
The building is made of bricks and has three floors. Whether wooden with metal overlap from roofing jelly-behind. On the side of the main facade were two dormer windows. The window openings are very large in size, and end at the top of the "beam" [in a ?]form of brickwork. Due to the technological requirements of the production processes, all three floors of the building have different heights.

The building is an example of the historical layout of a provincial merchant city. It typifies the common architecture for the beginning of the 20th century, as expressed in the planned integrated development of industrial buildings in the city center.
