= Zhaltyr (North Kazakhstan Region) =

Lake in Kazakhstan

- Жалтыр
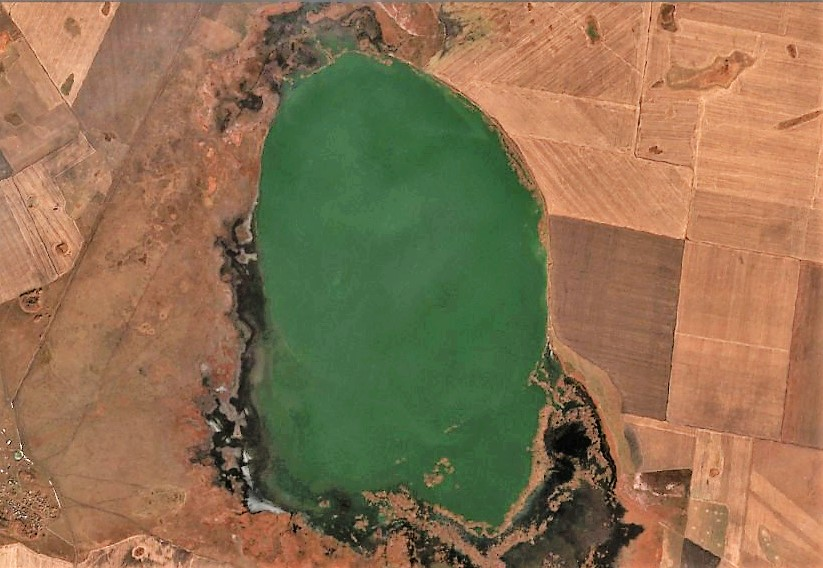
- Sentinel-2 image of the lake in October

- Location within Kazakhstan
- Location: Kazakh Uplands
- Coordinates: 53°58′46″N 67°15′58″E
- Type: endorheic
- Basin countries: Kazakhstan
- Max. length: 5.7 kilometers (3.5 mi)
- Max. width: 3.1 kilometers (1.9 mi)
- Surface area: 13.5 square kilometers (5.2 sq mi)
- Residence time: UTC+6
- Shore length^{1}: 17.5 kilometers (10.9 mi)
- Surface elevation: 152.6 meters (501 ft)
- Settlements: Zhaltyr
- ^{1} Shore length is not a well-defined measure.

Zhaltyr (Kazakh: Жалтыр) is a salt lake in Shal akyn District, North Kazakhstan Region, Kazakhstan.

The lake is located 15 kilometers (9.3 mi) to the northwest of Sergeyev town, the administrative center of the district. Zhaltyr village lies 2 kilometers (1.2 mi) to the west of the lake and Dmitriyevka 17 kilometers (11 mi) to the southwest.

== Geography ==
Zhaltyr is an endorheic lake belonging to the Ishim River basin. It is located at the northwestern edge of the Kokshetau Hills. The lake has a roughly oval shape oriented from north to south. The lakeshore is flat and marshy. Zhaltyr fills with snow and groundwater and it usually freezes in November and stays under ice until April.

The northern end of the Sergeyev Dam lies 15 kilometers (9.3 mi) to the southeast and lake Kak 37 kilometers (23 mi) to the southwest. There are numerous small lakes to the north and the northwest.

== Flora and fauna ==
The Zhaltyr basin is surrounded by steppe vegetation and agricultural fields. Large swathes are used as a pasture for local cattle. The salinity of the lake water increases in the summer, but it can be used for watering livestock in the spring. There are fish living in the lake.

== See also ==
- List of lakes of Kazakhstan
