= Kaak =

Kaak may refer to:

- Hudson Kaak (born 2001), Australian gridiron football player
- Ka'ak, Middle Eastern baked good
- Kaak (bread), kind of bread and a native dish of Baloch and Pashtun peoples, Pakistan
- Kaak (cartoonist) (1940–2025), a cartoonist from India
- KAAK, an American FM radio station

== See also ==
- Kaack, a surname
- Kak (disambiguation)
- Kaaks, a place in Germany
