= Sergeyev Dam =

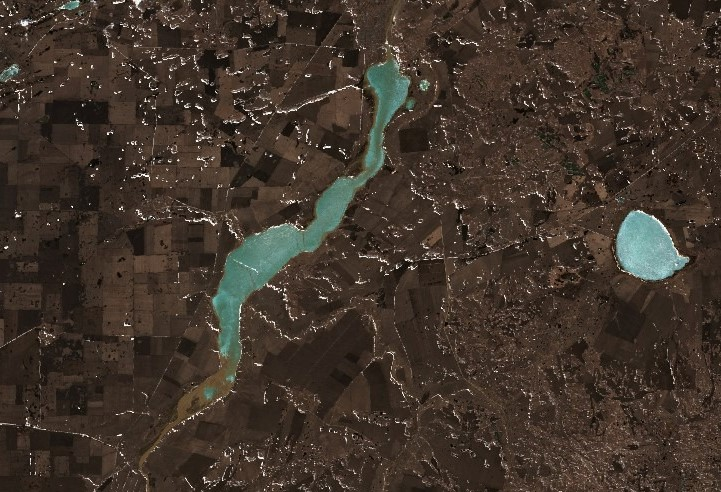
- Sergeyev Reservoir Sentinel-2 image. Lake Kishi Torangyl is on the right.

- Location within Kazakhstan
- Official name: Сергеев бөгені
- Country: Kazakhstan
- Location: Shal akyn District, North Kazakhstan Region
- Coordinates: 53°42′08″N 67°17′03″E
- Purpose: Power and water supply
- Opening date: 1969; 57 years ago
- Owner: RSE "Kazvodkhoz"

Dam and spillways
- Type of dam: Earth, concrete
- Impounds: Imanburlyq, Ishim River
- Height: 150 m (490 ft)

Reservoir
- Creates: Sergeyev Reservoir
- Total capacity: 693,000,000 m^{3} (562,000 acre⋅ft)
- Surface area: 117 km^{2} (45 mi^{2})
- Maximum length: 75 km (47 mi)
- Maximum width: 7 km (4.3 mi)
- Normal elevation: 138 m (453 ft)

Power Station
- Type: Conventional
- Turbines: 2

Sergeyev Dam or Sergeyevka Dam (Kazakh: Сергеев бөгені; Russian: Сергеевское водохранилище) is a gravity dam in Shal akyn District, North Kazakhstan Region, Kazakhstan.

The dam is located a little upstream from Sergeyev town on the Ishim River, 15 kilometers (9.3 mi) to the southeast of lake Zhaltyr. It has a road bridge, as well as a pumping station for the Sergeev city water supply, which is part of the Ishim Water Supply Network (Kazakh: Есіл су құбыры) that operates in the North Kazakhstan and Akmola Regions.

== History ==
The Sergeyevka Dam was commissioned in 1968 at the time of the Kazakh SSR. It had a hydroelectric power station with an installed power generation capacity of 2 MW. The hydroelectric power station building has a bottom spillway. The reservoir of the dam has a maximum storage capacity of 693,000,000 m^{3} (562,000 acre⋅ft) and a surface area of 117 km^{2} (45 mi^{2}). The Imanburlyq, a tributary of the Ishim River, has its mouth in the reservoir.

Currently the power station has a capacity of 3.5 MW with two propeller turbines connected to VGSP 213/29-14 generators with a capacity of 1.23 MW each. The average annual electricity generation is 16 million kWh. The dam is owned by RSE "Kazvodkhoz", which manages 78 reservoirs in Kazakhstan.

== See also ==
- List of dams and reservoirs
