= Administrative building of the North-Kazakhstan regional executive committee =

Coordinates: 54°52′8.3″N 69°7′46.7″E

The Administrative building of the North-Kazakhstan regional executive committee
- Здание административное Северо-Казахстанского облисполкома
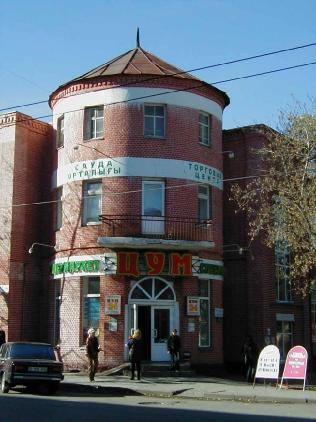

General information
- Status: Monument of Culture
- Architectural style: Baroque
- Location: Petropavl
- Country: Kazakhstan
- Completed: 1930s

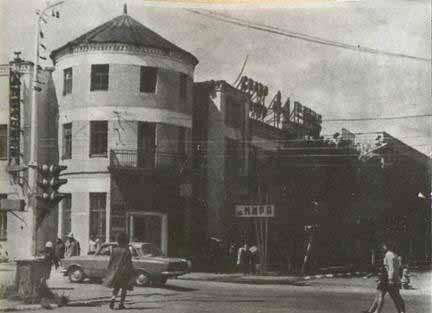
The Administrative building of the North-Kazakhstan regional executive committee. 1984

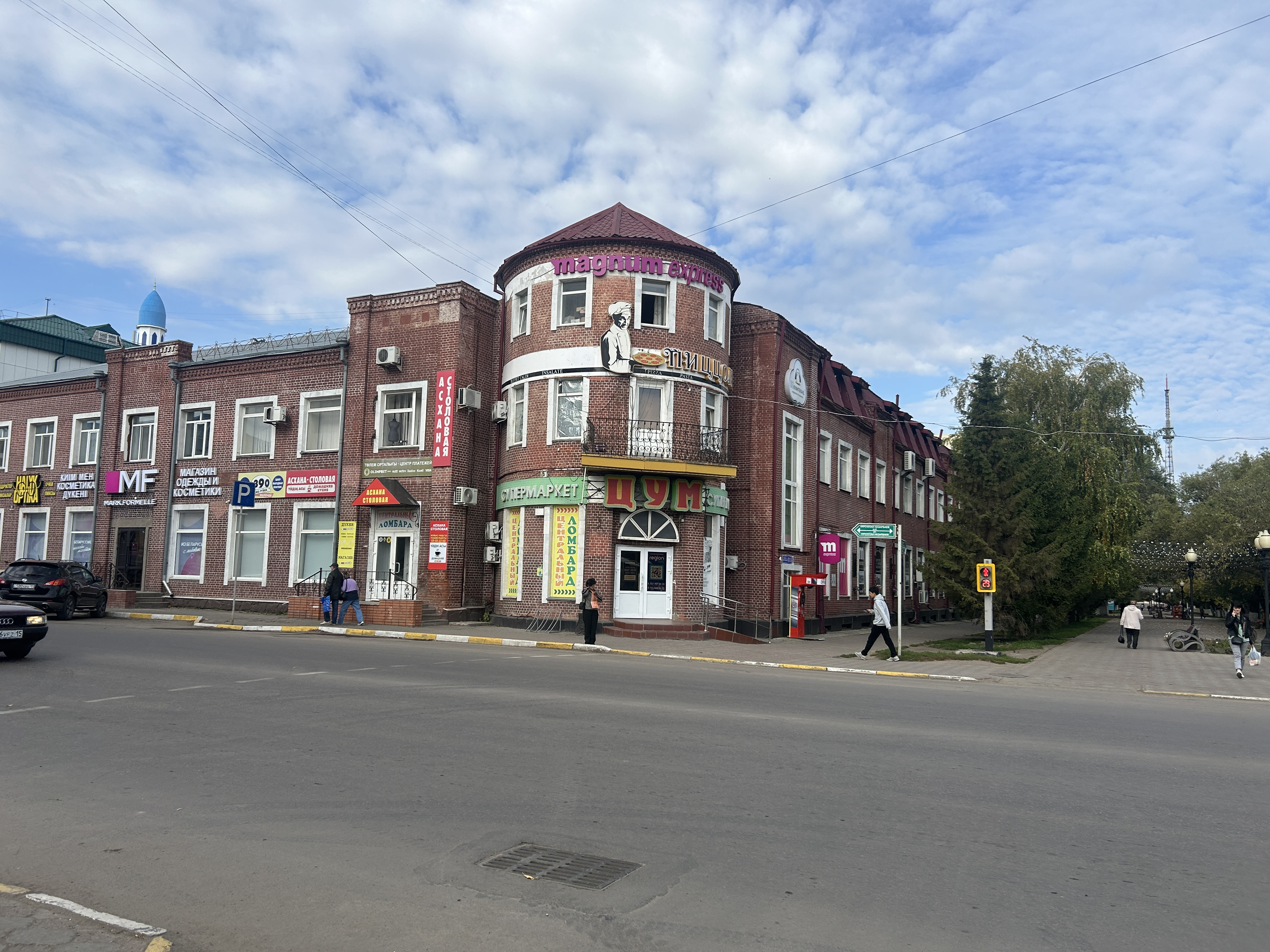
The Administrative building of the North-Kazakhstan regional executive committee, Petropavlovsk

The Administrative building of the North-Kazakhstan regional executive committee is located on Constitution Street, 13, Petropavl.

The building was built in the 1930s, intended for the construction of the building of the Siberian Joint-Stock People's Bank. In the 1930s, the North Kazakhstan Regional Executive Committee was located there.

In the 70s, there were dining rooms and restaurants, a canteen, and the editorial office of the newspaper Leninskoye Znamya. Currently, it is restored and there you can find shopping areas of a private central department store and a supermarket.

The building is two-story, brick, unplastered. The corner of the building is decorated with round tower with a conical roof. The windows are rectangular. The roof is hip. After the restoration work and reconstruction, a mansard floor was built.

== Literature ==
- ГАСКО. Ф. 158 « Личный фонд Бенюха М. И.».
- ГАСКО. Ф. 3037. Инв. № 7425.
- Северо-Казахстанская область. Энциклопедия. Алматы. 2004. Сс. 435-437.
