= Kak (Ulken Kak) =

Lake in Kazakhstan

- Қақ / Үлкен Қақ
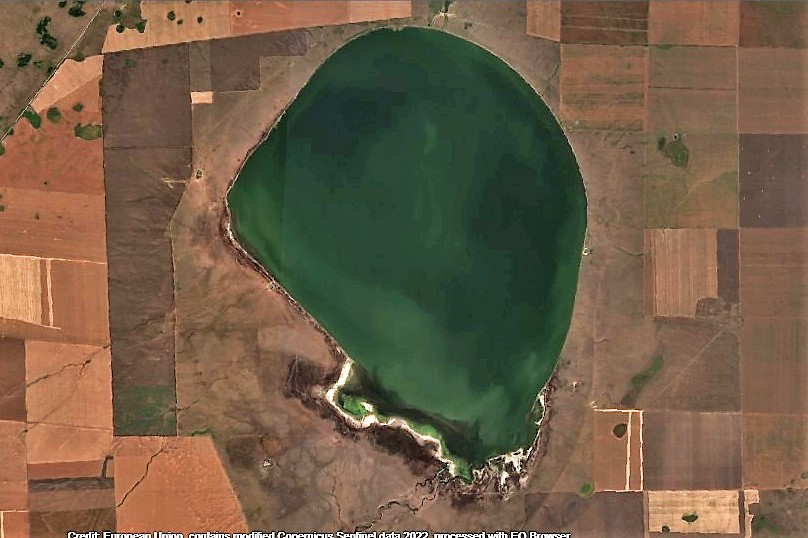
- Sentinel-2 image of the lake in 2021

- Location within Kazakhstan
- Location: Ishim Plain; West Siberian Plain
- Coordinates: 53°35′N 66°12′E
- Basin countries: Kazakhstan
- Max. length: 9.3 kilometers (5.8 mi)
- Max. width: 7.3 kilometers (4.5 mi)
- Surface area: 52.24 square kilometers (20.17 sq mi)
- Average depth: 1 meter (3 ft 3 in)
- Residence time: UTC+6
- Shore length^{1}: 31 kilometers (19 mi)
- Surface elevation: 163.7 meters (537 ft)
- ^{1} Shore length is not a well-defined measure.

Kak (Kazakh: Қақ; Russian: Как), also known as Ulken Kak (Kazakh: Үлкен Қақ), is a lake in Timiryazev District, North Kazakhstan Region, Kazakhstan.

The southern shore of the lake lies very close to the border with Kostanay Region. Timiryazevo town, the administrative center of the district, lies 25 kilometers (16 mi) to the northeast of the lake.

== Geography ==
Kak lies in a shallow depression to the west of the Ishim, in an area of scattered lakes at the southern limits of the West Siberian Plain. The lake is roughly oval, has very little depth and its bottom is flat. The middle of the lake has a maximum depth of only about 1 meter (3 ft 3 in) and is surrounded by a wide zone of clayey shoals. Its main food is snow and the level of the water is subject to seasonal changes, shrinking by 20 to 40% in years of drought. The water of the lake is fresh and soft, with a mineralization between 0.3 grams per liter (1.1×10^{−5} lb/cu in) and 0.4 grams per liter (1.4×10^{−5} lb/cu in).

The lake is also known as "Big Kak" in order to differentiate it from Kak (Kishi Kak) "Little Kak" lake, located 38 kilometers (24 mi) to the ENE in the same district.

== Fauna ==
The vegetation in the area of lake Kak was formerly forest-steppe, but nowadays the lake is largely surrounded by agricultural fields. The lake is visited by large flocks of waterbirds and waders, such as the red-breasted goose, whooper swan and common crane, as well as by the white-tailed eagle. It is also one of the critical sites for the lesser white-fronted goose.

== See also ==
- List of lakes of Kazakhstan
