= Kaack =

Kaack is a surname. Notable people with the surname include:

- Jan Christian Kaack (born 1962), vice admiral of the German Navy
- Peter Kaack (1943–2025), German football player

== See also ==
- Kaak (disambiguation)
