= Timiryazevsky =

Timiryazevsky (masculine), Timiryazevskaya (feminine), or Timiryazevskoye (neuter) may refer to:

- Timiryazevsky District, a district of Northern Administrative Okrug, Moscow, Russia
- Timiryazevsky (rural locality), a rural locality (a settlement) in Chelyabinsk Oblast, Russia
- Timiryazevskoye, a rural locality (selo) in Tomsk Oblast, Russia
- Timiryazevskaya (Serpukhovsko-Timiryazevskaya line), a station of the Moscow Metro, Moscow, Russia
- Timiryazevskaya (Monorail), a station of the Moscow Monorail
- Timiryazevskaya railway station, a station of D1 line in Moscow, Russia

== See also ==
- Timiryazev (disambiguation)
- Serpukhovsko-Timiryazevskaya Line
