= Timiryazevo, Kamensky District, Voronezh Oblast =

Timiryazevo Тимирязево
- Selo
- Location within Voronezh Oblast Location within Russia
- Coordinates: 50°43′N 39°22′E
- Country: Russia
- Region: Voronezh Oblast
- District: Kamensky District
- Time zone: UTC+3:00

Timiryazevo (Russian: Тимирязево) is a rural locality (a selo) in Tkhorevskoye Rural Settlement, Kamensky District, Voronezh Oblast, Russia. The population was 536 as of 2010. There are 8 streets.

== Geography ==
Timiryazevo is located 4 km northwest of Kamenka (the district's administrative centre) by road. Kamenka is the nearest rural locality.
