= Timiryazevo, Vladimir Oblast =

Timiryazevo Тимирязево
- Village
- Location within Vladimir Oblast Location within Russia
- Coordinates: 56°09′N 42°46′E
- Country: Russia
- Region: Vladimir Oblast
- District: Gorokhovetsky District
- Time zone: UTC+3:00

Timiryazevo (Russian: Тимирязево) is a rural locality (a village) in Kupriyanovskoye Rural Settlement, Gorokhovetsky District, Vladimir Oblast, Russia. The population was 5 as of 2010. There are 4 streets.

== Geography ==
Timiryazevo is located 15 km southeast of Gorokhovets (the district's administrative centre) by road. Shankovo is the nearest rural locality.
