= Timiryazev District =

Coordinates: 53°48′00″N 66°32′24″E

Timiryazev
- District
- Тимирязев ауданы
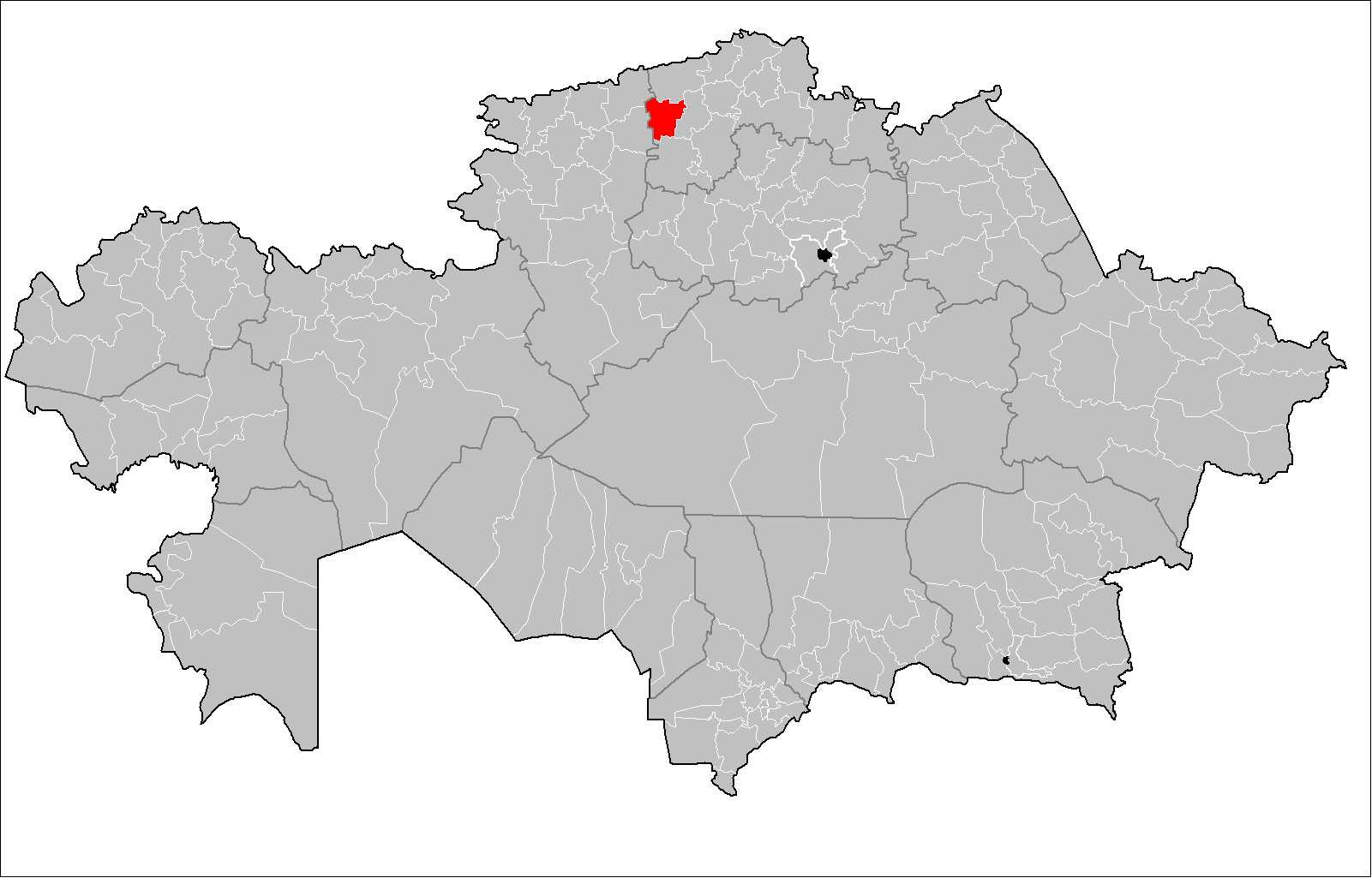
- Country: Kazakhstan
- Region: North Kazakhstan Region
- Administrative center: Timiryazevo

Government
  - Akim: Zharov Yerlan Kairovich

Population (2013)
  - Total: 12,960
- Time zone: UTC+6 (East)

Timiryazev (Kazakh: Тимирязев ауданы, Timiriazev audany) is a district of North Kazakhstan Region in northern Kazakhstan. Named after Kliment Timiryazev, a famous Russian botanist and physiologist. The administrative center of the district is the town of Timiryazevo. Population: 12,960 (2013 estimate); 13,978 (2009 census results); 20,081 (1999 census results).

== Geography ==
Lakes Ulken Kak and Kishi Kak are located in the district.
