= Timiryazevo, North Kazakhstan =

Timiryazevo Тимирязево
- Village
- Location in Kazakhstan
- Coordinates: 53°35′N 66°12′E
- Country: Kazakhstan
- Region: North Kazakhstan Region
- District: Timiryazev District
- Rural District: Timiryazev Rural District
- Settled: 1954

Population (2019)
  - Total: 4,601
- Time zone: UTC+6 (East Kazakhstan Time)
- Post code: 151100

Timiryazevo (Kazakh: Тимирязево) is a town and the administrative center of Timiryazev District in North Kazakhstan Region of Kazakhstan (KATO code - 596230100). Population: 4,601 (2009 census results); 5,592 (1999 census results).

== Geography ==
Timiryazevo is located at a distance of 235 kilometers (146 mi) from the regional center, the city of Petropavl. Lake Alpash lies close to the north and Lake Kak (Big Kak) 25 kilometers (16 mi) to the southwest of the town.

=== Climate ===
Timiryazevo has a warm-summer humid continental climate (Dfb) according to the Köppen climate classification.

Climate data for Timiryazevo (1991–2020)
| Month | Jan | Feb | Mar | Apr | May | Jun | Jul | Aug | Sep | Oct | Nov | Dec | Year |
|---|---|---|---|---|---|---|---|---|---|---|---|---|---|
| Mean daily maximum °C (°F) | −11.7 (10.9) | −10.3 (13.5) | −2.7 (27.1) | 10.5 (50.9) | 20.8 (69.4) | 25.5 (77.9) | 26.3 (79.3) | 24.7 (76.5) | 18.4 (65.1) | 9.5 (49.1) | −2.3 (27.9) | −9.1 (15.6) | 8.3 (46.9) |
| Daily mean °C (°F) | −16.1 (3.0) | −15.0 (5.0) | −7.5 (18.5) | 4.7 (40.5) | 13.7 (56.7) | 18.8 (65.8) | 19.9 (67.8) | 18.0 (64.4) | 11.6 (52.9) | 4.2 (39.6) | −6.2 (20.8) | −13.3 (8.1) | 2.7 (36.9) |
| Mean daily minimum °C (°F) | −20.4 (−4.7) | −19.5 (−3.1) | −12.0 (10.4) | −0.3 (31.5) | 6.8 (44.2) | 12.0 (53.6) | 13.7 (56.7) | 11.9 (53.4) | 5.9 (42.6) | −0.3 (31.5) | −9.9 (14.2) | −17.6 (0.3) | −2.5 (27.5) |
| Average precipitation mm (inches) | 14.4 (0.57) | 12.3 (0.48) | 18.7 (0.74) | 25.1 (0.99) | 27.6 (1.09) | 41.7 (1.64) | 59.7 (2.35) | 50.0 (1.97) | 27.9 (1.10) | 29.6 (1.17) | 21.6 (0.85) | 19.5 (0.77) | 348.0 (13.70) |
| Average precipitation days (≥ 1.0 mm) | 4.9 | 3.9 | 4.6 | 4.9 | 6.0 | 6.6 | 7.8 | 7.3 | 5.6 | 6.5 | 6.4 | 5.5 | 70.0 |
Source: NOAA
