= Kirghiz Autonomous Socialist Soviet Republic =

Kirghiz Autonomous Socialist Soviet Republic may refer to:

- Kirghiz Autonomous Socialist Soviet Republic (1920–25)
- Kirghiz Autonomous Socialist Soviet Republic (1926–36)
