= Timiryazevo, Novousmansky District, Voronezh Oblast =

Timiryazevo Тимирязево
- Settlement
- Location within Voronezh Oblast Location within Russia
- Coordinates: 51°34′N 39°39′E
- Country: Russia
- Region: Voronezh Oblast
- District: Novousmansky District
- Time zone: UTC+3:00

Timiryazevo (Russian: Тимирязево) is a rural locality (a settlement) and the administrative center of Timiryazevskoye Rural Settlement, Novousmansky District, Voronezh Oblast, Russia. The population was 750 as of 2010. There are 11 streets.

== Geography ==
Timiryazevo is located 10 km southeast of Novaya Usman (the district's administrative centre) by road. Kazanskaya Khava is the nearest rural locality.
