= Shal akyn District =

Coordinates: 53°47′24″N 67°26′24″E

Shal akyn
- District
- Шал ақын ауданы
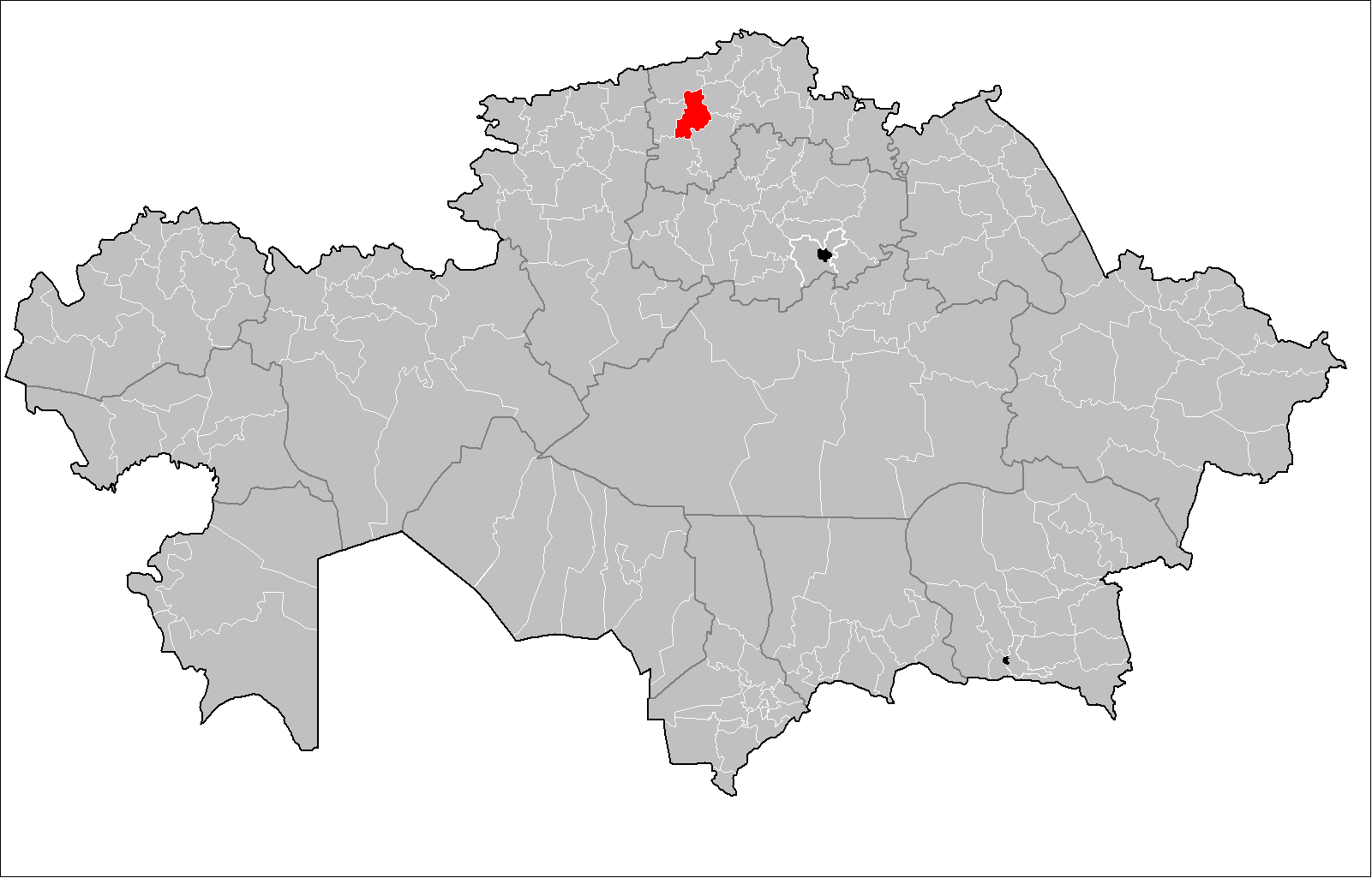
- Country: Kazakhstan
- Region: North Kazakhstan Region
- Administrative center: Sergeyev

Government
  - Akim: Kairat Omarov

Population (2013)
  - Total: 20,939
- Time zone: UTC+6 (East)

Shal akyn (Kazakh: Шал ақын ауданы, Şal aqyn audany) is a district of North Kazakhstan Region in northern Kazakhstan. Named after Shal akyn (1748-1819) (born Tleuke Kulekuly), a celebrated 18th-century Kazakh poet and improviser (akyn). The administrative center of the district is the town of Sergeyev. Population: 20,939 (2013 estimate); 23,095 (2009 census results); 32,375 (1999 census results).

== Geography ==
The Sergeyev Dam and lakes Kishi Torangyl and Zhaltyr are located in the district.
