= Sergeyev (Kazakhstan) =

Sergeyev Сергеев
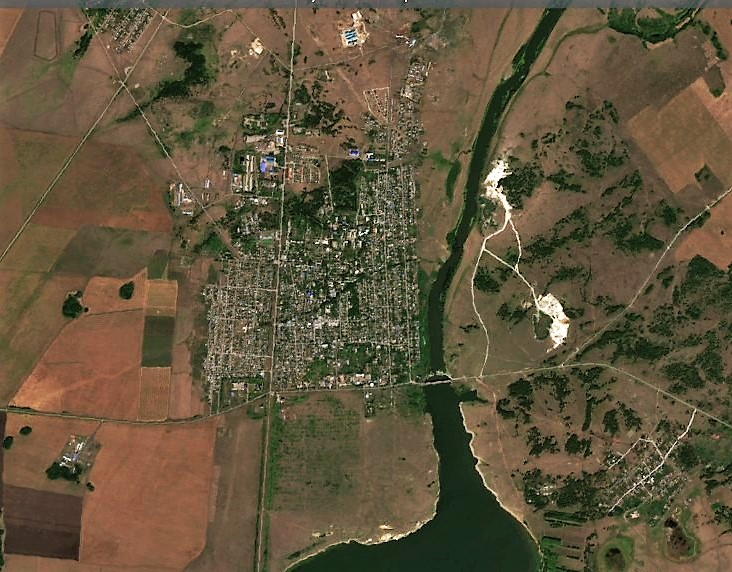
- Sergeyev town Sentinel-2 image

- Location in Kazakhstan
- Coordinates: 53.8800°N 67.4158°E
- Country: Kazakhstan
- Region: North Kazakhstan Region
- District: Shal akyn District

Population (2009)
  - Total: 7,661

Sergeyev (Kazakh: Сергеев; Russian: Сергеевка) is a town and the administrative center of Shal akyn District in North Kazakhstan Region of Kazakhstan. Population: 7,661 (2009 census results); 9,470 (1999 census results).

== Geography ==
Sergeyev is located by the left bank of the Ishim River, 160 kilometers (99 mi) southwest of Petropavl city, the capital of the region. The Sergeyev Dam lies close to the south of the town, and lake Zhaltyr 15 kilometers (9.3 mi) to the northwest .

== Climate ==
Sergeyev has a humid continental climate (Köppen: Dfb) with frigid winters and warm summers.

Climate data for Sergeyevka (1991–2020)
Month	Jan	Feb	Mar	Apr	May	Jun	Jul	Aug	Sep	Oct	Nov	Dec	Year
Mean daily maximum °C (°F)	−11.8 (10.8)	−10.2 (13.6)	−2.3 (27.9)	10.7 (51.3)	20.8 (69.4)	25.4 (77.7)	26.0 (78.8)	24.5 (76.1)	18.3 (64.9)	9.7 (49.5)	−2.4 (27.7)	−9.2 (15.4)	8.3 (46.9)
Daily mean °C (°F)	−16.2 (2.8)	−14.9 (5.2)	−7.3 (18.9)	4.7 (40.5)	13.7 (56.7)	18.6 (65.5)	19.8 (67.6)	17.8 (64.0)	11.6 (52.9)	4.3 (39.7)	−6.3 (20.7)	−13.4 (7.9)	2.7 (36.9)
Mean daily minimum °C (°F)	−20.6 (−5.1)	−19.5 (−3.1)	−12.0 (10.4)	−0.7 (30.7)	6.6 (43.9)	11.9 (53.4)	13.6 (56.5)	11.7 (53.1)	5.8 (42.4)	−0.2 (31.6)	−10.1 (13.8)	−17.7 (0.1)	−2.6 (27.3)
Average precipitation mm (inches)	18.8 (0.74)	17.5 (0.69)	21.7 (0.85)	25.5 (1.00)	37.4 (1.47)	40.8 (1.61)	62.2 (2.45)	51.6 (2.03)	29.0 (1.14)	29.5 (1.16)	26.0 (1.02)	23.3 (0.92)	383.3 (15.09)
Average precipitation days (≥ 1.0 mm)	6.0	5.2	5.1	5.5	7.2	6.8	8.5	7.6	5.7	6.8	7.0	6.6	78.0
Source: NOAA
