= Petropavl =

City in North Kazakhstan Region, Kazakhstan

Petropavl Петропавл (Kazakh) Петропавловск (Russian) Kyzylzhar
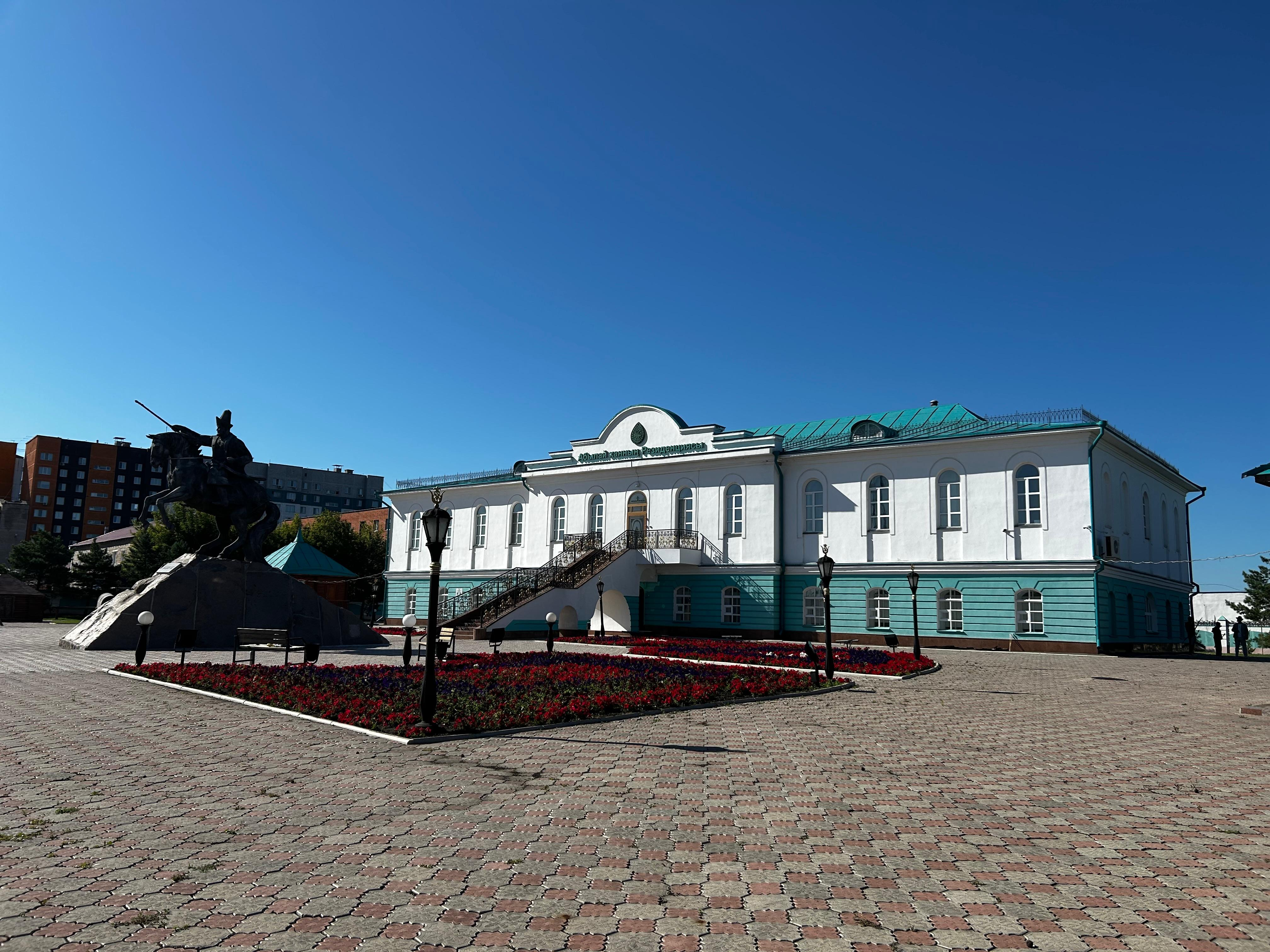
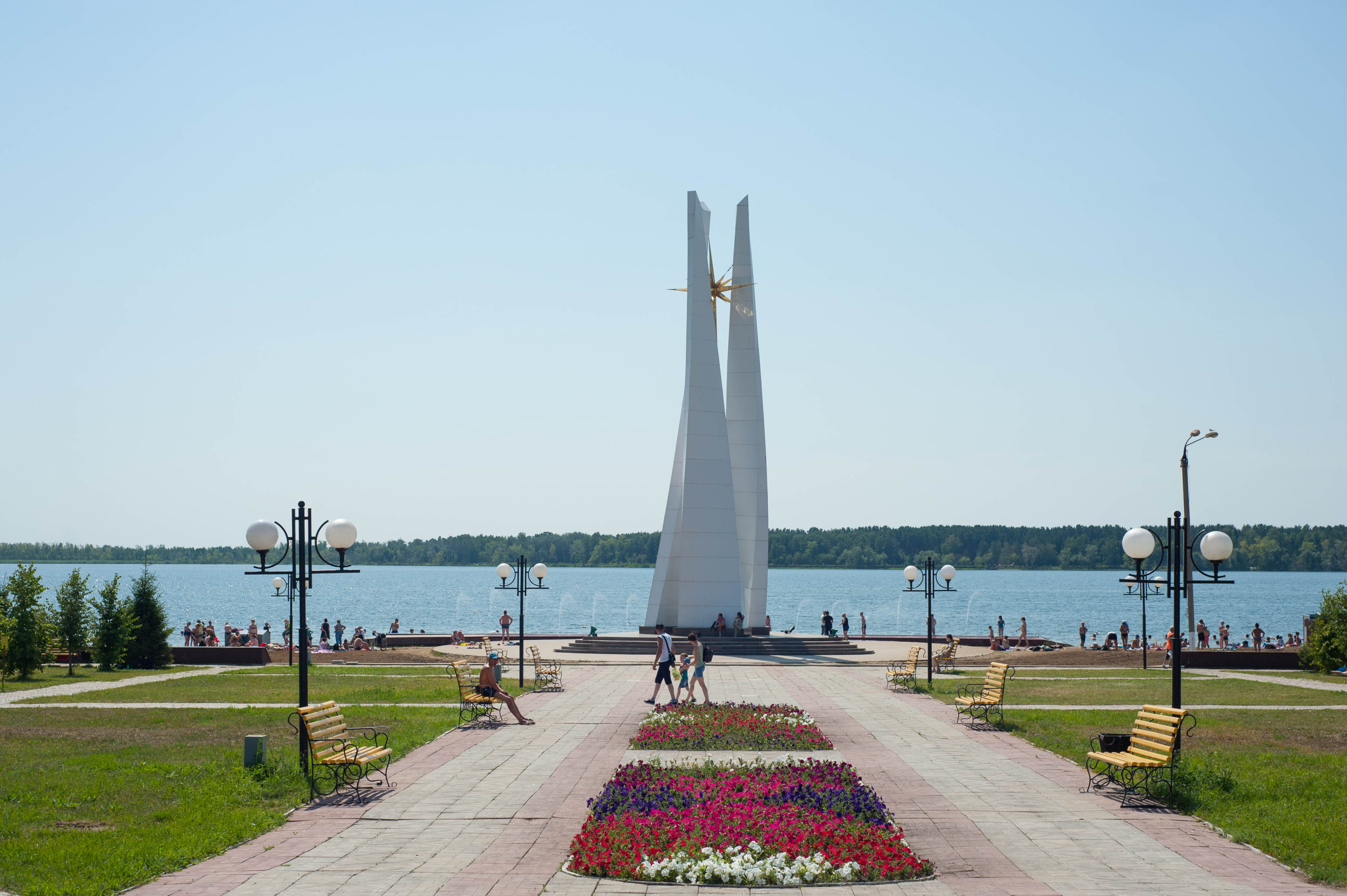
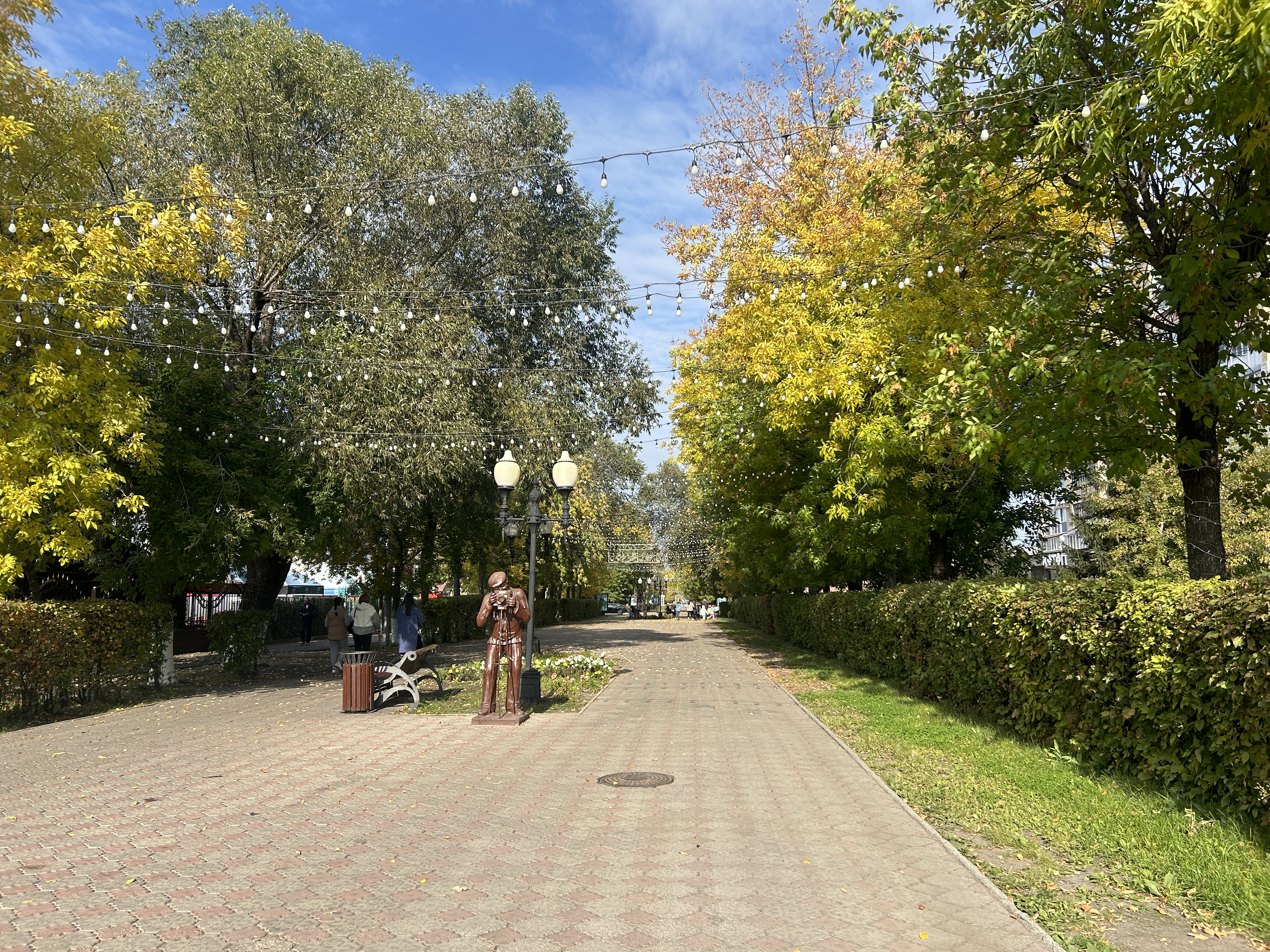
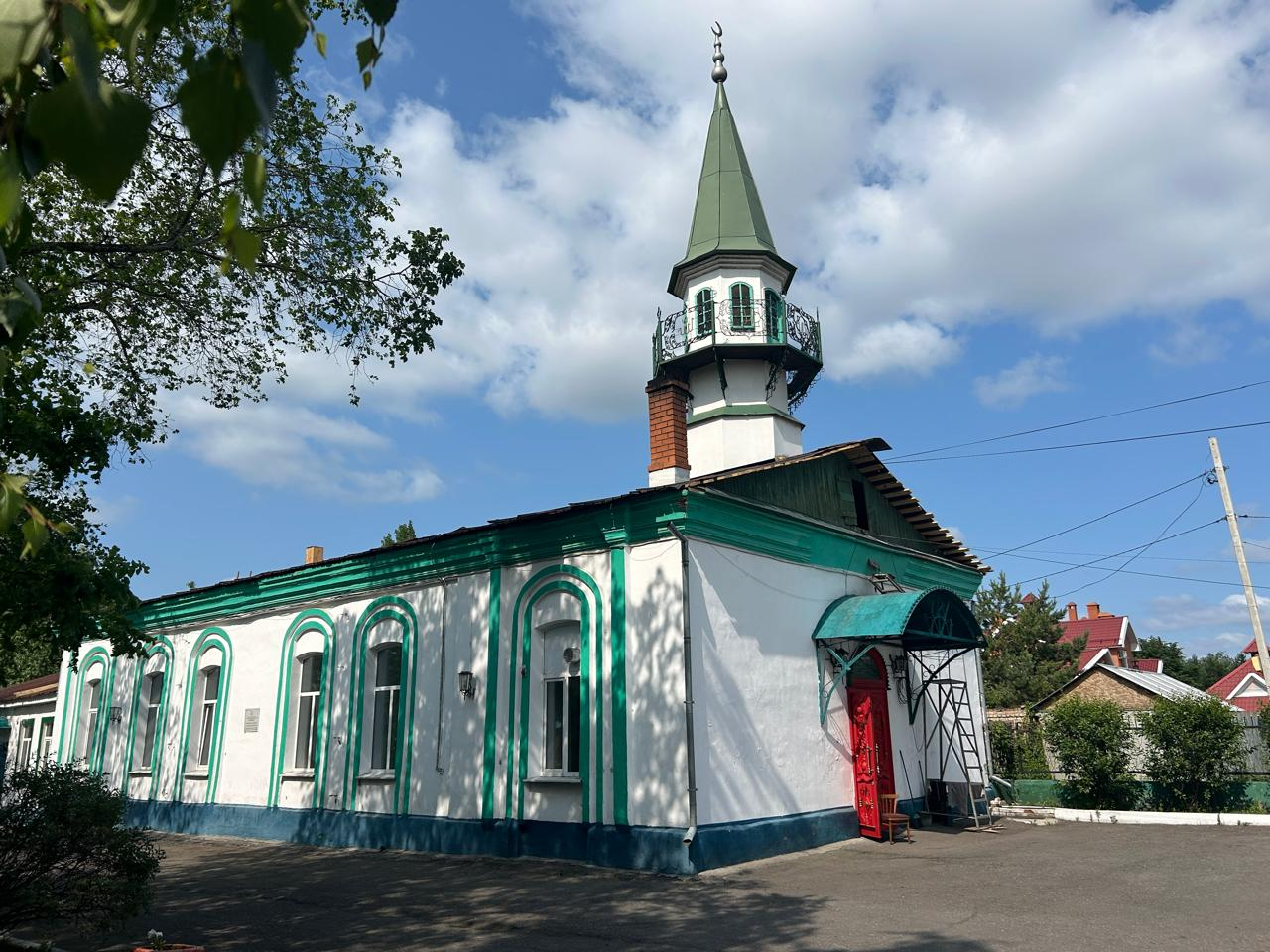
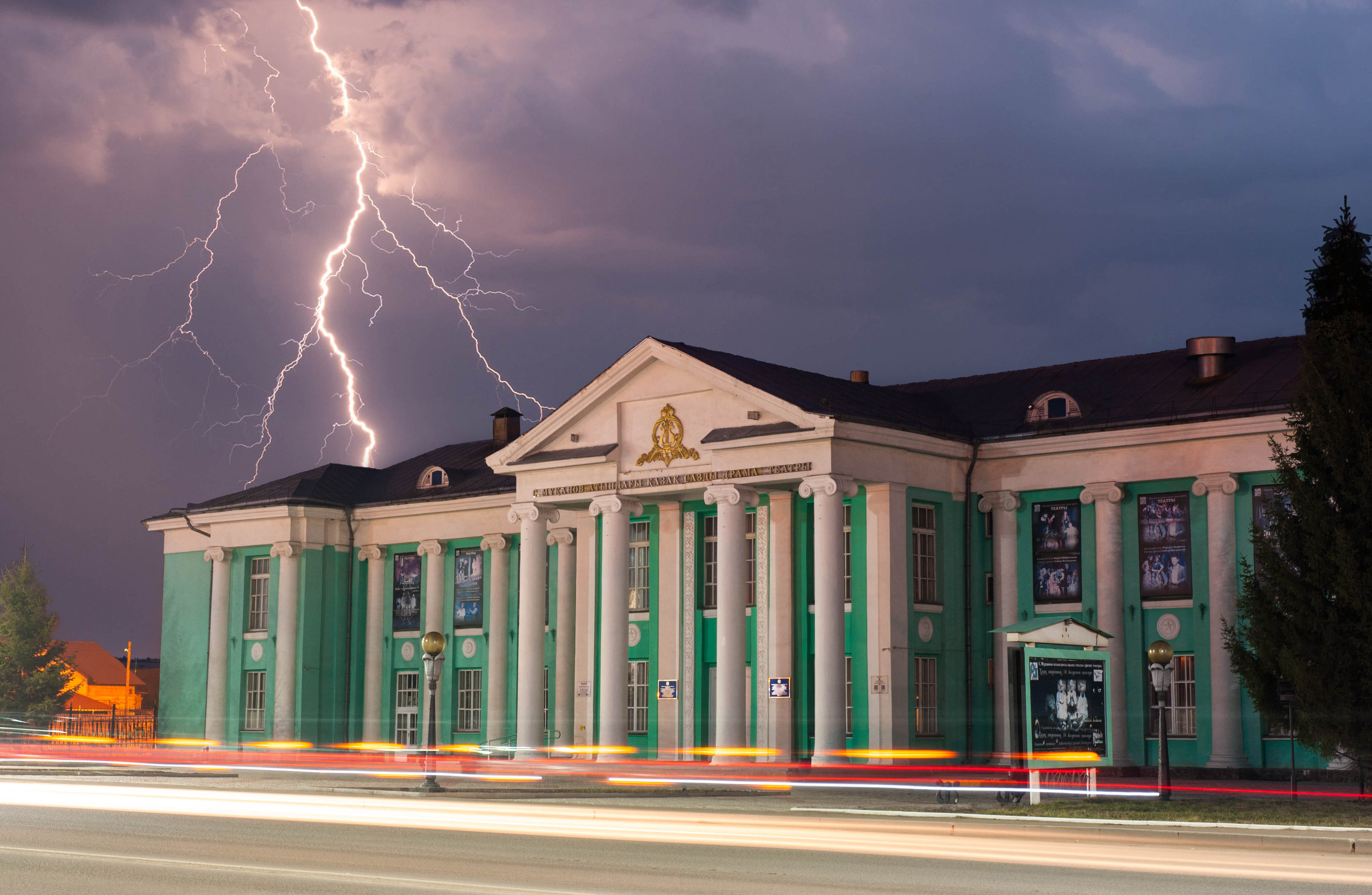
- Residence of Ablai Khan North Star Monument Constitution Street Fifth Cathedral Mosque Kazakh Drama Theater

- Seal

- Location in Kazakhstan
- Coordinates: 54°53′N 69°10′E
- Country: Kazakhstan
- Region: North Kazakhstan Region
- Founded: 1752
- City Status: 1807

Government
  - Akim (mayor): Serik Mukhamediev

Area
  - Total: 221.6 km^{2} (85.6 sq mi)
- Elevation: 140 m (460 ft)

Population (2009)
  - Total: 201,446
  - Density: 909.1/km^{2} (2,354/sq mi)
- Time zone: UTC+5 (Time in Kazakhstan)
- Postal code: 150001 - 150013
- Area code: +7 7152
- Vehicle registration: T, 15
- Website: petropavl.sko.kz

Petropavl (Kazakh: Петропавл) or Petropavlovsk (Russian: Петропавловск) is a city on the Ishim River in northern Kazakhstan close to the border with Russia. It is the capital of the North Kazakhstan Region and has a population of 218,956 (as of 2020). The city is also known in Kazakh as Kyzylzhar (Kazakh: Қызылжар, romanized: Qyzyljar, lit. 'Red cliff').

Petropavl is about 185 km (115 mi) from Kökşetau, 428 km (266 mi) northwest of the national capital Astana along the A1, and 261 km (162 mi) from Omsk.

== Physical-geographical characteristics ==
=== Geographical location ===
Petropavl is located in the southwestern part of the West Siberian Plain, on the right bank of the Ishim River, the longest tributary of the Irtysh River. Not far from Petropavl, there are many lakes and ponds, such as Lake Bolshoe Beloe, Lake Pestroye, Lake Kishtibish, Lake Maloe Beloe and Bitter Lake. Small forests can be found within the city, mostly consisting of birches and pine plantations.

=== Climate ===
The climate is a dry version of the humid continental (Köppen Dfb) type, with sharp winter-summer temperature fluctuations. In spring, prevails clear and dry weather, with a large number of sunny days. Summers are quite hot, with a predominance of clear, often dry weather, in some years the rains can be of different frequencies, from rare and up to passing to a cloudy and rainy summer. Autumn begins in August or September, and the weather is observed from clear at the beginning of the season, to cloudy in October–November. Winter is frosty and long (more than 5 months), with stable snow cover up to 0.40 to 0.50 metres or 15.7 to 19.7 inches high on average, with the predominance of clear weather, in some years with infrequent snowstorms and blizzards.

Based on 1991 to 2020 means:

- The average annual temperature is 2.5 °C or 36.5 °F.
- The average relative humidity of the air is 74%.
- The average annual precipitation is 388 millimetres or 15.28 inches.

Climate data for Petropavl (1991–2020, extremes 1890–present)
Month	Jan	Feb	Mar	Apr	May	Jun	Jul	Aug	Sep	Oct	Nov	Dec	Year
Record high °C (°F)	4.5 (40.1)	6.7 (44.1)	15.8 (60.4)	31.0 (87.8)	37.2 (99.0)	40.3 (104.5)	40.5 (104.9)	38.6 (101.5)	35.2 (95.4)	26.2 (79.2)	15.6 (60.1)	3.7 (38.7)	40.5 (104.9)
Mean daily maximum °C (°F)	−12.5 (9.5)	−10.0 (14.0)	−2.0 (28.4)	10.1 (50.2)	19.8 (67.6)	24.1 (75.4)	25.0 (77.0)	23.3 (73.9)	17.0 (62.6)	8.9 (48.0)	−3.1 (26.4)	−9.8 (14.4)	7.6 (45.7)
Daily mean °C (°F)	−16.5 (2.3)	−14.7 (5.5)	−6.9 (19.6)	4.7 (40.5)	13.3 (55.9)	18.1 (64.6)	19.5 (67.1)	17.4 (63.3)	11.2 (52.2)	4.3 (39.7)	−6.6 (20.1)	−13.7 (7.3)	2.5 (36.5)
Mean daily minimum °C (°F)	−20.8 (−5.4)	−19.5 (−3.1)	−11.7 (10.9)	−0.4 (31.3)	6.8 (44.2)	12.1 (53.8)	14.0 (57.2)	12.1 (53.8)	6.1 (43.0)	0.4 (32.7)	−10.1 (13.8)	−17.7 (0.1)	−2.4 (27.7)
Record low °C (°F)	−48.0 (−54.4)	−42.5 (−44.5)	−36.8 (−34.2)	−26.4 (−15.5)	−17.6 (0.3)	−2.6 (27.3)	1.3 (34.3)	−4.0 (24.8)	−9.4 (15.1)	−25.6 (−14.1)	−37.5 (−35.5)	−45.0 (−49.0)	−48.0 (−54.4)
Average precipitation mm (inches)	19 (0.7)	16 (0.6)	20 (0.8)	24 (0.9)	33 (1.3)	45 (1.8)	69 (2.7)	45 (1.8)	31 (1.2)	30 (1.2)	30 (1.2)	25 (1.0)	387 (15.2)
Average rainy days	1	1	4	8	14	14	13	14	15	12	5	2	103
Average snowy days	20	17	14	6	2	0.1	0	0	0	8	17	20	104
Average relative humidity (%)	82	80	80	69	58	62	69	71	71	77	84	82	74
Mean monthly sunshine hours	76.4	116.0	182.8	228.9	288.8	288.7	275.8	237.4	174.3	111.3	66.3	52.2	2,098.9
Source 1: Pogoda.ru.net
Source 2: NOAA

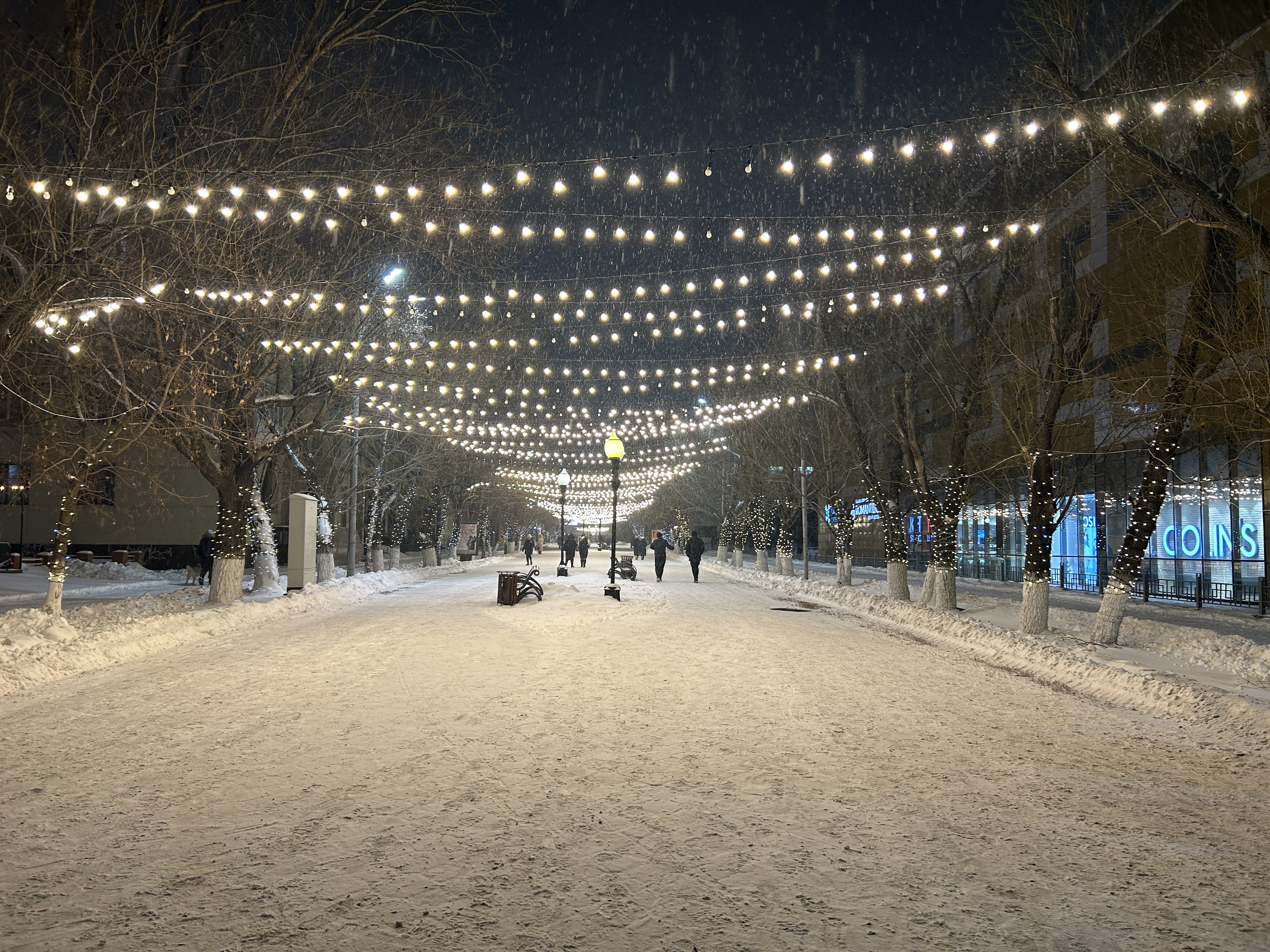
Winter in Petropavl

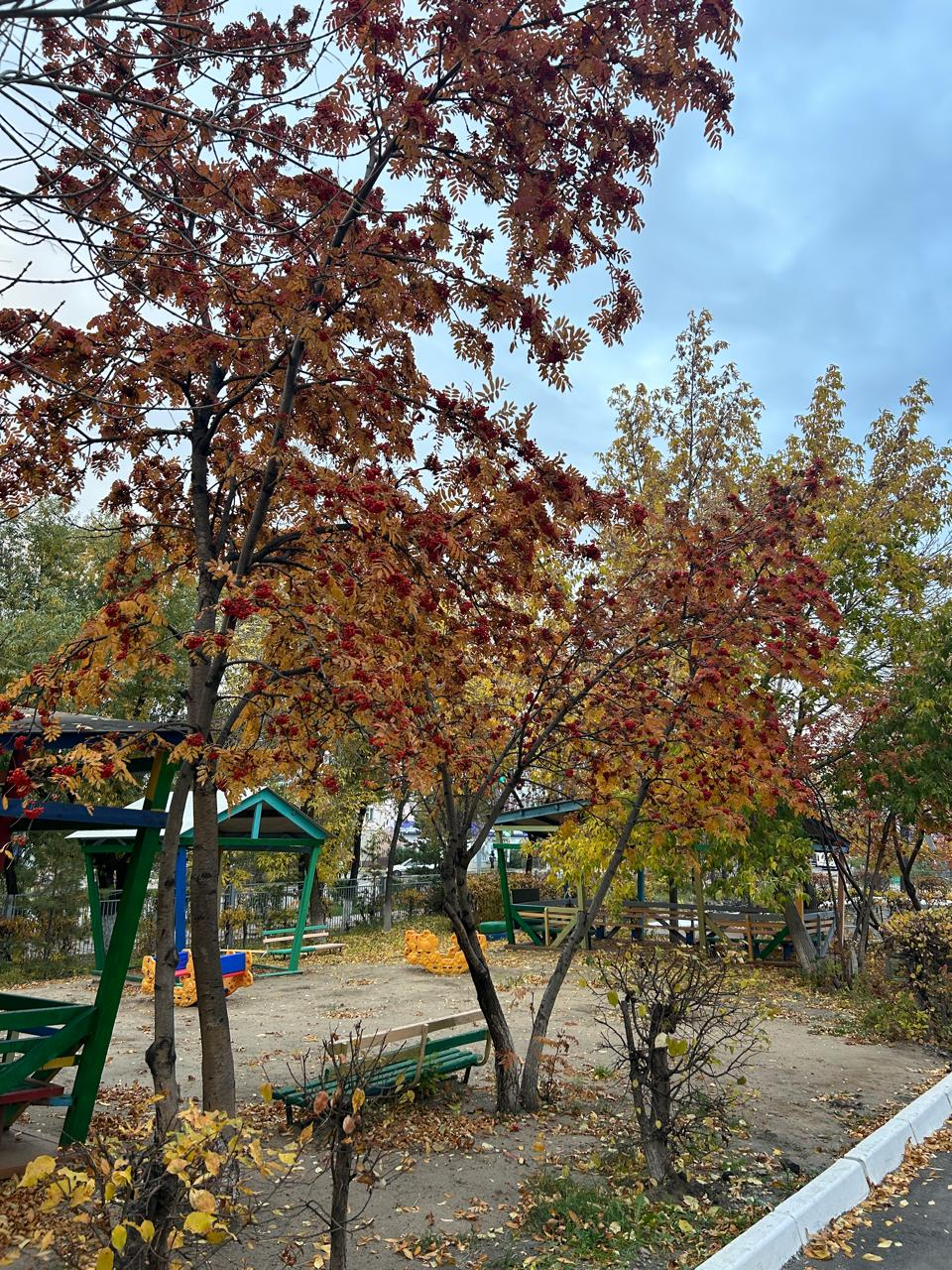
Autumn in Petropavl

== Population ==
Population by declared ethnicity (at the beginning of 2020):

- Russians — 129,970 people (59.28%);
- Kazakhs — 65,739 people (29.99%);
- Tatars — 6,573 people (3.00%);
- Ukrainians — 4,500 people (2.05%);
- Germans — 4,237 people (1.93%);
- Poles — 1,036 people (0.47%);
- Belarusians — 969 people (0.44%);
- Azerbaijanis — 931 people (0.42%);
- Armenians — 921 people (0.42%);
- Tajiks — 886 people (0.40%);
- Uzbeks — 275 people (0.13%);
- Others — 3,194 people (1.46%).
- Total — 219,231 inhabitants.

== Symbolism of the city ==
The first coat of arms of the district city of Petropavlovsk, Tobolsk province, was approved on September 7, 1842 (law No. 16351): In the upper half of the shield, the coat of arms of Tobolsk. In the lower one, "in a silver field on a mountain, a camel loaded with two bales at the ready and led by a rope by an Asiatic." The modern coat of Arms is made in the form of a circle with a traditional Kazakh ornament around the perimeter and is a stylized Scythian shield. The ornament of the coat of arms includes Shanyrak, which divides the circle into 4 parts, each of which depicts 4 main elements that characterize the city in the beginning of the 21st century. In the upper sector there is a key-a symbol of the geographical location of the city, "Northern gate of Kazakhstan". This is followed by a sheaf of wheat, which is important for the city of agriculture and agricultural processing enterprises. The lower part shows an open book, symbolizing the high cultural and educational level of the city. The next sector is occupied by gear-industry and manufacturing. The song ends with a ribbon with the name of the city in the state language.

== History ==
Petropavlovsk was founded in the summer of 1752 as a military fortress of Saint Peter and is located on the site of the Kyzyl-Zhar tract, on the right bank of the Ishim river. Initially, it was considered a military outpost and was a major trading center in the North of the Kazakh khanate.

In the 14th and 15th centuries, the Kazakh khanate was formed on the territory of modern Kazakhstan, consisting of three zhuzs. Each of them had common routes of nomads and a common territory. The middle zhuz of the Kazakhs, consisting of the Argyn, Kerey, Kongrat and Naiman tribes, occupied the Northern, North-Eastern and Central parts of Kazakhstan. Their main occupation was nomadic and semi-nomadic cattle breeding.

In the middle of the 17th century, the Kazakh-Dzungar Wars began. During the war for their lands, the Kazakhs were forced to migrate to the southern steppes. In this regard, in the 17th century and at the beginning of the 18th century, in Northern Kazakhstan, the nomadic population is rare. In the 18th century, the war for the return of Northern Kazakhstan continued. The southern part of the steppes and areas of North-Eastern Kazakhstan became the battleground of the Kazakhs and Dzungars.

At this time, the Kazakh khans decided to accept Russian citizenship: the younger zhuz took citizenship in 1731 and later in 1740, the middle zhuz took citizenship. In the steppe, defensive fortifications were built, among these fortifications was the fortress of St. Peter.

=== Within the Russian Empire ===
In 1752, during the reign of Elizabeth Petrovna, the Senate, in order to strengthen the southern borders of the Russian Empire, recognized the need to urgently begin construction of a new Ishim line. By a decree of the Senate of February 25, 1752, General Kinderman was ordered to build a line of fortifications from the Omsk fortress on the Irtysh to the Beast's Head tract on Tobol. In June 1752, an expedition consisting of Dragoons of the Lutsk regiment, foot soldiers of the Noteburg regiment and a battalion of the Vologda Dragoon regiment, almost 2 thousand people, moved to the tract on the Ishim river. A small forest, nestled up against the floodplain of lake Babalawo Dragoons crossed to the right Bank of the Ishim river. Two steep ravines that bounded the construction site, went to the Ishim and together with the steep Bank of a wide (up to 47 m) river created a natural barrier to the enemy. The expedition had to build a large fortification in a short time — the fortress of St. Petersburg. Peter and two small-fortress Noon and Swan, and between them 8 redoubts. Given the imminent onset of cold weather, we decided to build wooden fortifications.

The fortress on Ishim had the shape of a regular hexagon with an area of about 2 hectares. At the corners of its equal distance located the bastions connected by curtain walls. The bastions facing the river were called Nagorny and Ishim. The total length of the fortress fence was more than 1.3 km. In the bastions were placed guns, inside the fortress-barracks, stables, officers ' houses, garrison Church, powder magazine, and other premises. Hard work exhausted the soldiers and Cossacks, as well as poor nutrition and early cold weather. People got sick, many died, and escapes became more frequent.

In early October, snow fell and work was stopped. In addition to the officers, 50 dragoons and 40 soldiers remained in the fortress. In severe winter conditions, a small garrison provided constant surveillance of the steppe, watching for signs of distress from nearby redoubts. The fortress was connected with Russia by a chain of post stations. In the spring of 1753, construction resumed.

The area of the fortress was soon built up to the limit, and some rooms were built outside the walls of the fortress. So, later formed the Upper forstadt-on the mountain, and in the Foothills-the Lower forstadt. Forstadt is a settlement where the main role is played by the fortress and the military. In the Lower forstadt there is a Cossack village, a hospital, and a locksmith's shop. For security reasons, the suburb was surrounded by a fence. The entrance and exit were guarded by special guards.

As well as other fortified points in Siberia, the fortress of St. Peter was strengthened militarily: the garrison was increased, wooden walls and bastions were replaced with earthen ones. The barracks were rebuilt, and a "salt house" was built to receive representatives of Kokand. According to the instructions of the Senate, kolodniki exiled to Siberia for hard labor (up to 100–300) were used for the work. In 1772, the fortress had two suburbs: the upland part and the foothills. The merchant class grew, as the fortress became a major political and economic center of the priishimye region.

Thanks to Abylai Khan, the fortress became a major point of exchange and transit trade, which influenced the economic development of the steppe. Trade routes from Russia and Central Asia converged here.

Local Kazakhs borrowed mowing, tilling, fishing, veterinary medicine skills from immigrants.

In 1782, in the fortress of St. Peter, in the presence of the Governor-General of the Ufa and Simbirsk governorates, I. V. Yakobi, the Sultan of the Middle Zhuz, Vali Khan, took the solemn oath of allegiance to the Russian government. He was officially confirmed as a Khan by the Russian Empire.

In 1807, the fortress was renamed into the city of Petropavlovsk with the addition of Tobolsk province. On September 7, the first mayor of the fortress was appointed, Peter Levashov (a retired major with a salary of 300 rubles).

By a nominal decree of January 22, 1822 "on the division of the Siberian provinces into Western and Eastern administrations", Siberia was divided into Western (center — Tobolsk) and Eastern (center — Irkutsk). Petropavlovsk was classified as a medium-sized city and became a district city of the newly formed Omsk region, assigned to the Western main administration.

In 1824, the Petropavlovsk district of the Omsk region was formed with the administrative center in Petropavlovsk, where offices were opened. In 1825, the city government was organized. In the same year, the first city budget was drawn up and the first city head was appointed, which was the merchant F. Zenkov.

On April 16, 1838, Petropavlovsk was made a minor city of Ishimsky uyezd of Tobolsk province, since the Omsk region was abolished.

On November 4, 1868, when the Akmola region was formed (it existed from 1868–1919), with its center in Omsk, Petropavlovsk became a district city in this region.

During the war with Napoleon, citizens and peasants twice sent recruits and voluntarily donated about 30 thousand rubles to the defense of the Fatherland.

On May 11, 1849, a fire broke out, destroying 450 houses. After that, the new construction began according to the plan approved by the Tsar. The author of the plan was the architect Chernenko, who did not take into account the features of the soil and terrain, and the foothills sank in spring floods more than once. The relocation of peasants from European Russia and the construction of the Siberian railway contributed to the development of the city.

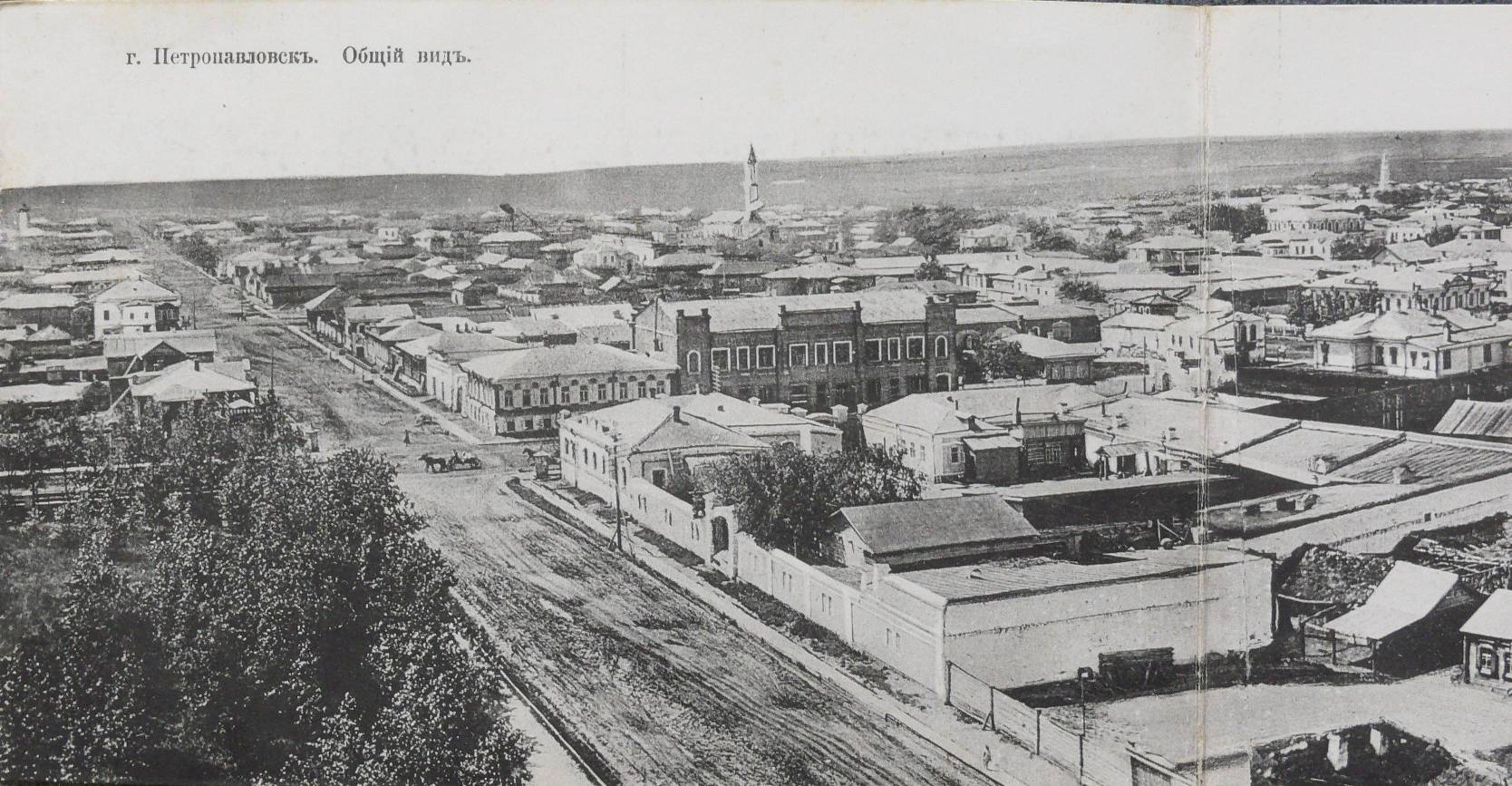
Panorama from 1914

Petropavlovsk oil production supplied oil to St. Petersburg, Moscow, Riga, Revel, Odesa, Samara, Vladivostok, as well as to England, Germany and Denmark. The largest were the Zenkov brothers' tannery, and the factory for processing the intestines of the Swiss Accola. According to the census of 1897, there were 20,014 people living in Petropavlovsk. Accounted for the bulk of Russians, Kazakhs, there were about 1500 people. A significant group were the immigrant Tatars. According to the source "Cities of Russia in 1910" St. Petersburg, 1914 in 1910, 37,973 people lived in Petropavlovsk, including by national composition: Russians — 72.8%, Turkish-Tatars — 25.2%, Poles — 0.5%, Jews-1.1%, Germans-0.2%, Finns-0.2 %.

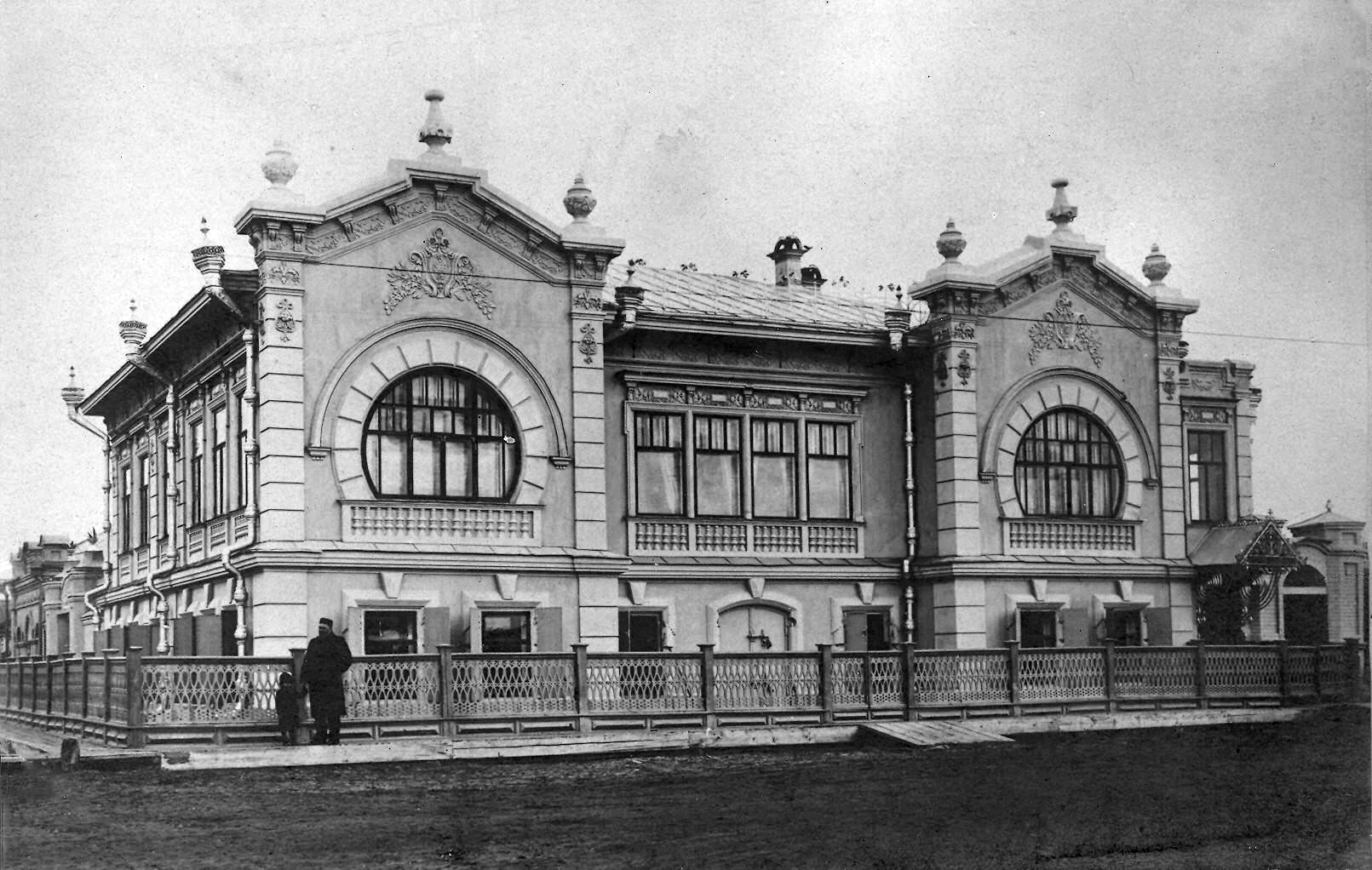
Art Nouveau mansion of merchant Yangurazov in the 1910s

For a long time, a distinctive feature of the city remained the low level of improvement, lack of sewage, cluttered streets, the unsanitary condition of bazaars and slaughterhouses, which contributed to the spread of diseases. The city had one hospital with 10 beds. By 1900, there were 13 educational institutions in the city, including one fifth-grade school, one women's gymnasium, two parochial schools, one parish school, two village schools, and six Tatar schools. The largest enterprise in the city was a cannery, built in 1915, which employed 100 people. There were nine mosques in the city, of which six were made of stone.

In 1896, the Petropavlovsk railway station of the South Ural railway was built near the city as part of the Trans-Siberian railway.

=== In the Soviet period ===
In 1918, Petropavlovsk became one of the centers of the White Russian movement. On May 31, the chief of the Siberian Cossacks V. I. Volkov, with the support of the Czechoslovaks, overthrew the Soviet government. Colonel Pankratov became the commander of the city. The ideological justification for the resistance was the support of the Constituent Assembly. During the Peter and Paul operation of the 5th Army on October 31, 1919, Soviet power was restored in the city.

In 1919–1921, Petropavlovsk was a district city in the Omsk province of the RSFSR.

On August 26, 1920, the decree of the Central Executive Committee and the SNK of the RSFSR on the formation of the Autonomous Kyrgyz Republic (1920-1925), later the Cossack ASSR, was signed. Then four uyezds of the Omsk province of the RSFSR (existed in 1919–1925) (Atbasar, Akmolinsky, Kokchetavsky and Petropavlovsk) temporarily remained under the jurisdiction of the Sibrevkom until the final decision of the Extraordinary authorized Commission of the Kaztsik on the reception of this territory. The commission had two main tasks. First, to prepare the conditions for the implementation of administrative reform, as a result of which Petropavlovsk from a district city was to become the administrative center of the Akmola province. Secondly, to establish the borders of this province with other provinces of the RSFSR. On April 26, 1921, the resolution of the Extraordinary authorized Commission of Kaztsik on the admission and organization of the Akmola province with the administrative center in the city of Petropavlovsk was issued.

A horse stud farm was established in the 1920s.

Within the Kazakh ASSR, Petropavlovsk was the administrative center of the Akmola province from April 26, 1921, to January 17, 1928, then of the Kyzyl-Zhar district from January 17, 1928, to May 10, 1928, and of the Petropavlovsk district from May 10, 1928 to December 17, 1930. From December 17, 1930 to March 10, 1932, Petropavlovsk was directly controlled by the Republican government of the Kazakh ASSR. From 1932 to 1936, Petropavlovsk was the administrative center of the Karaganda region of the Kazakh ASSR. From 1936, Petropavlovsk was the regional center of the established North Kazakhstan region within the Kazakh SSR and since 1991, the Republic of Kazakhstan.

In 1941, when the USSR was invaded by the Axis powers during World War II, many factories producing heavy machinery were evacuated to the east. Many factories, such as the V. I. Lenin Plant, the S. M. Kirov Plant, and the V. V. Kuibyshev Plant, were built in Petropavlovsk to manufacture heavy equipment for the war, i.e. tanks, armored personnel carriers, and so on. Today, the remaining factories mostly produce and assemble small equipment. Also, in connection with the formation of the Polish Anders' Army, a Polish diplomatic post was located in the city from February to July 1942.

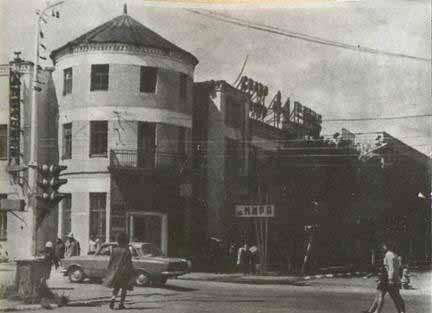
Administrative building of the North-Kazakhstan regional executive committee in 1984

=== As part of an independent Kazakhstan ===
When Kazakhstan gained its independence, Petropavlovsk, which is the Russian exonym for the city, was mostly replaced in official circles by Petropavl.

In 2008, Petropavl took part in the contest "The Best City in the CIS", where it was awarded three grants, including the grant "For The Preservation of Historical and Cultural Heritage".

In 2014, the trolleybus system which formerly ran in the city was abolished.

On November 27, 2018, the rural localities of Kuibyshevskoye village, Novopavlovka village, Teplovskoye village, and Stop point 2629 located on the territory of the city akimat of Petropavl were incorporated directly into the city of Petropavl.

== Education ==
There are 43 organizations of preschool education, 38 secondary schools, 13 colleges, 5 higher educational institutions in Petropavlovsk.

== Notable people ==
- Nagima Aitkhozhina (1946–2020), molecular biologist, was born in Petropavlovsk

== Culture ==
=== Theatres ===
The Main Theatre in Petropavl is named after the Kazakh writer Sabit Mukanov, and performances are given in the Kazakh language. Viewers without knowledge of Kazakh are given headphones which serve to translate the performance into Russian, making it accessible to the many Non-Kazakh-Speakers living in Petropavl.

Petropavl's regional puppet theatre has been operating since February 1991. It is located in a building on 69 Vasilieva street. In addition to children's performances, it is used to show films and hold new year's matinees.

The Theatre has been named after the Soviet playwright Nikolai Fyodorovich Pogodin, who was awarded the prestigious Lenin Prize in 1986. Children's' performances are held in the morning, while adults' performances are held in the evening. The Theatre also has a studio for aspiring young actors.

=== Museums ===
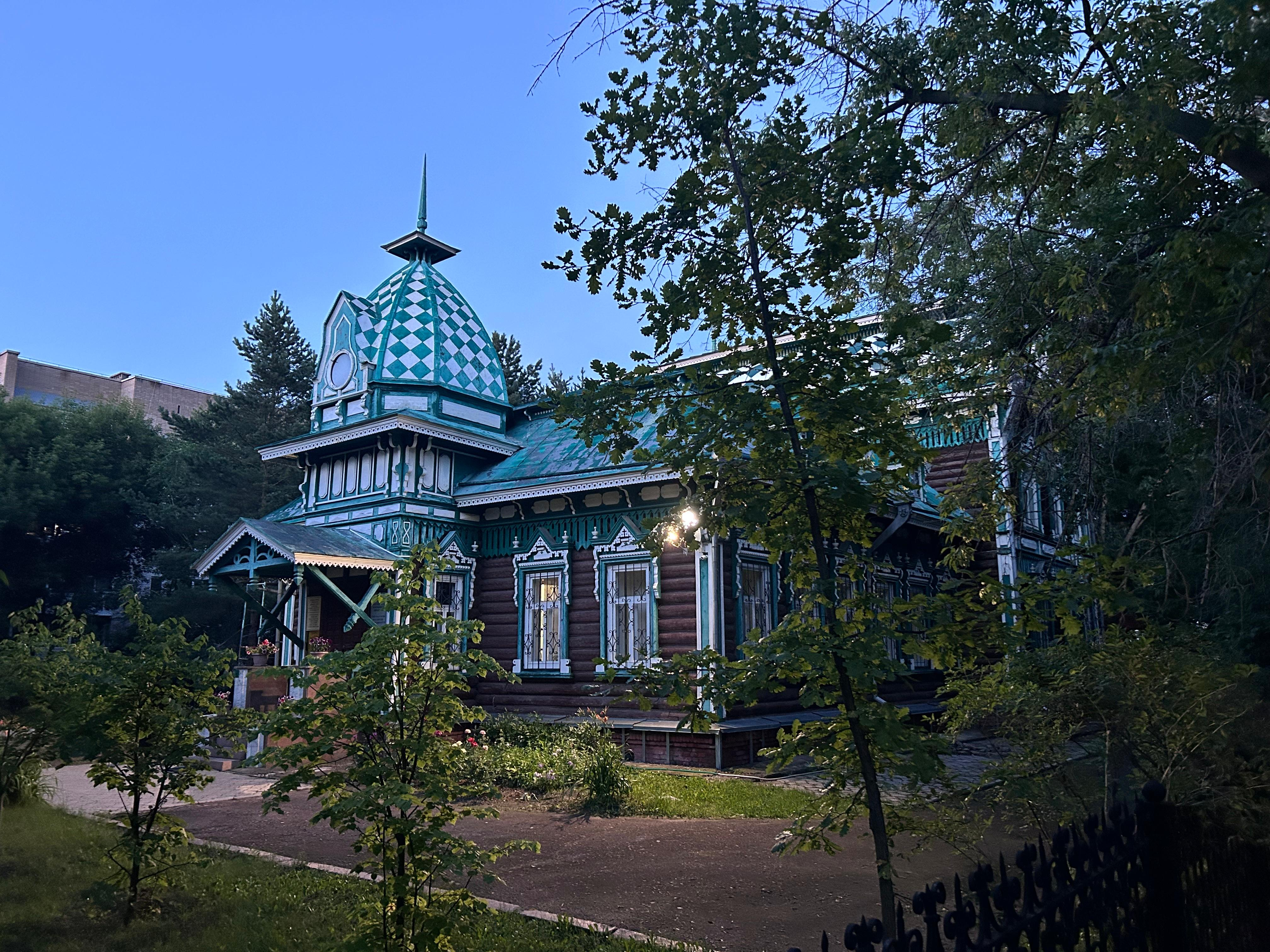
North Kazakhstan Regional Museum of Fine Arts

The North Kazakhstan Regional Museum of Local History opened in 1924.

The North Kazakhstan Regional Museum of Fine Arts opened in 1989.

The North Kazakhstan Regional Philharmonic Society was established in 1965.

== Transportation ==
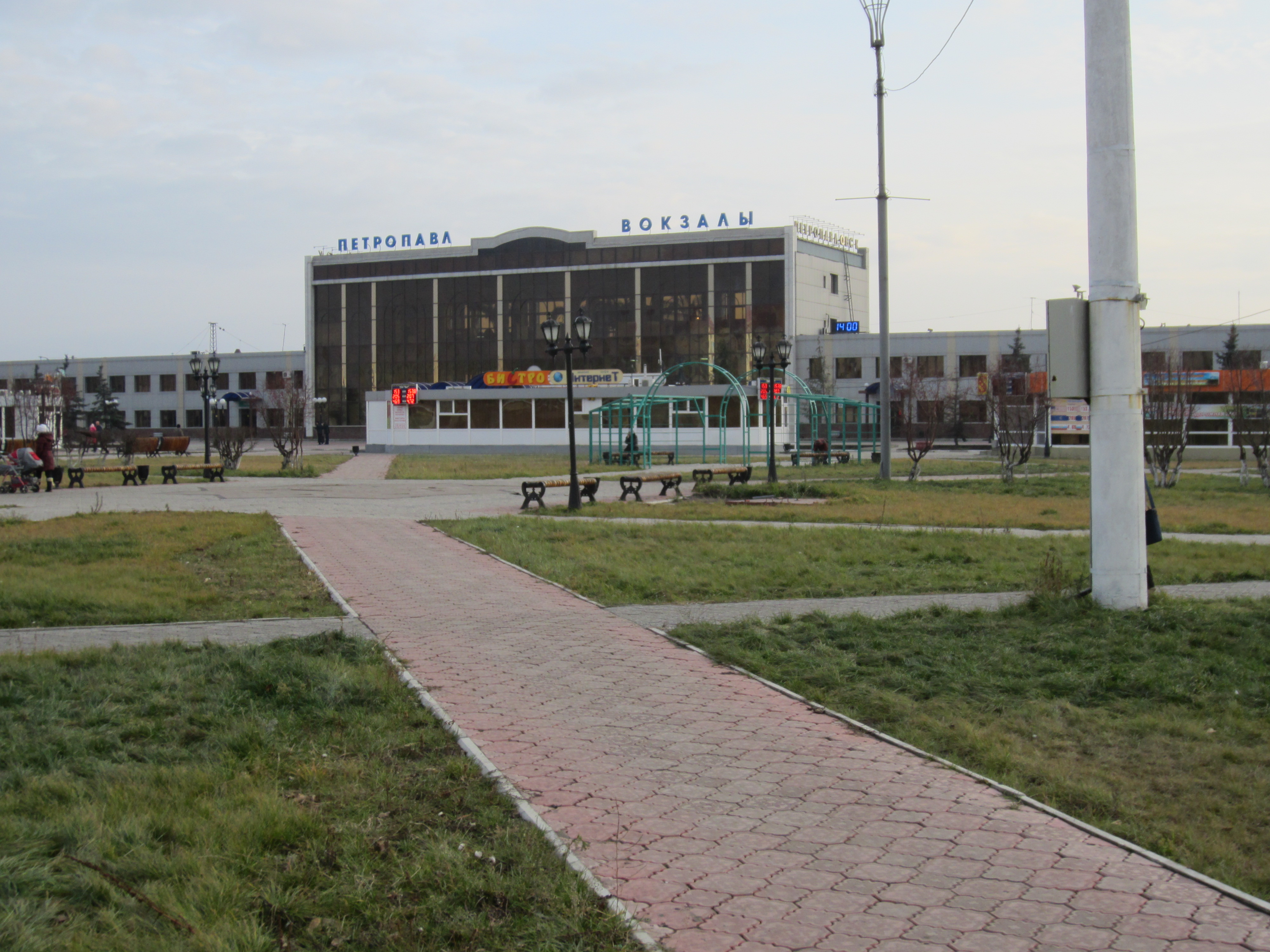
Railway station in Petropavl

Petropavl has a railway station with connections to the Russian capital Moscow and Kazakhstan's capital Astana.

Petropavl Airport is located 11 km (7 mi) south of the city.

== Sports ==
The city's bandy team in the Spartakiade 2009 on home ice was victorious. In 2013 it was hosted in Petropavl again, this time the team from Khromtau won. 12–17 December 2016 the Kazakh Cup, to the memory of Kazbek Baybulov, was played at Stadium Karasay in Petropavl. The home team Volna captured the bronze medal.

Olympic gold medal-winning cyclist Alexander Vinokourov is a native of nearby Bishkul.

== Twin Town – Sister City ==
Petropavl is twinned with:

- Omsk, Russia
