= North Kazakhstan Region =

Region in northern Kazakhstan

North Kazakhstan Region Солтүстік Қазақстан облысы (Kazakh) Северо-Казахстанская область (Russian)
- Region
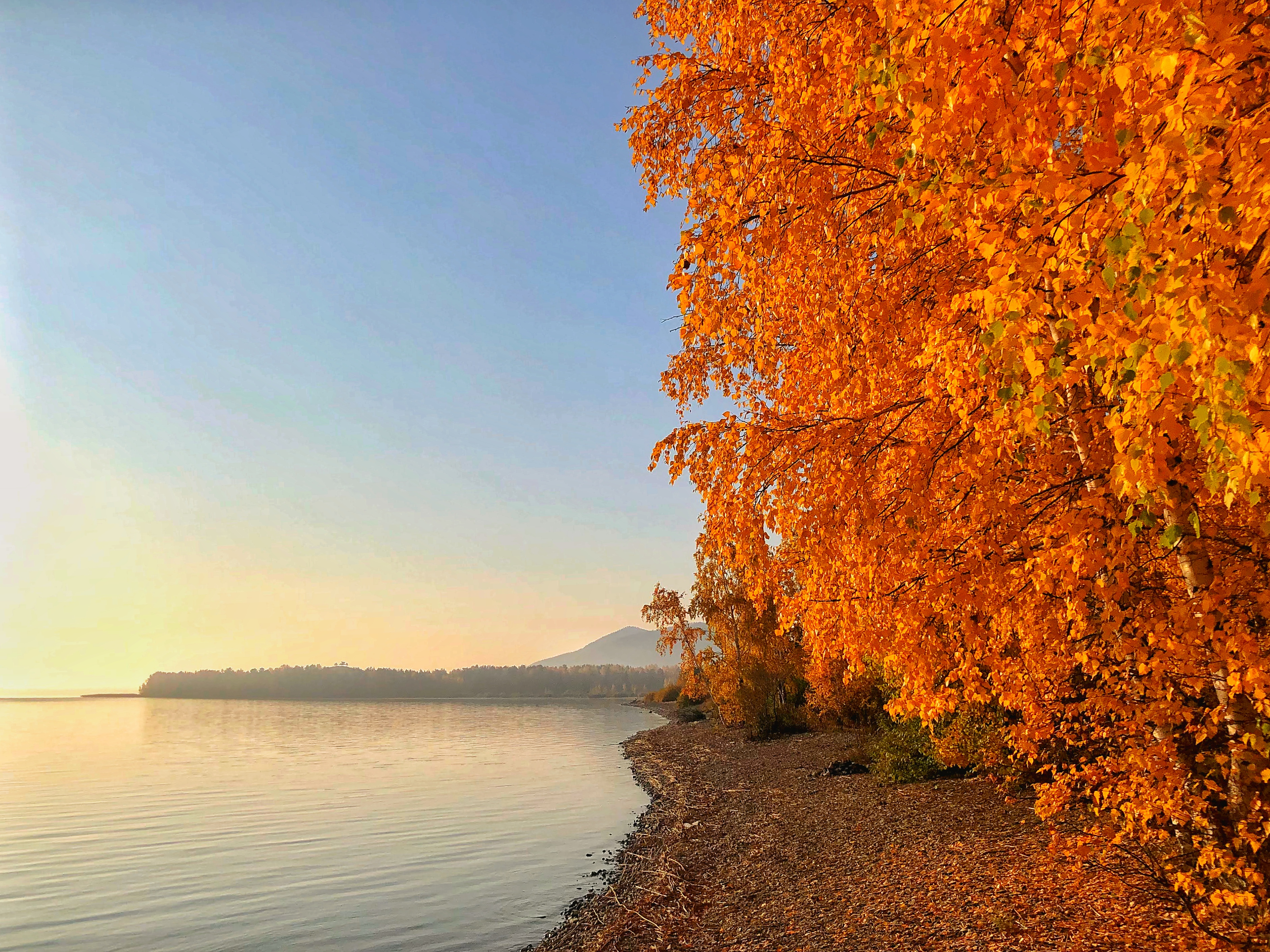
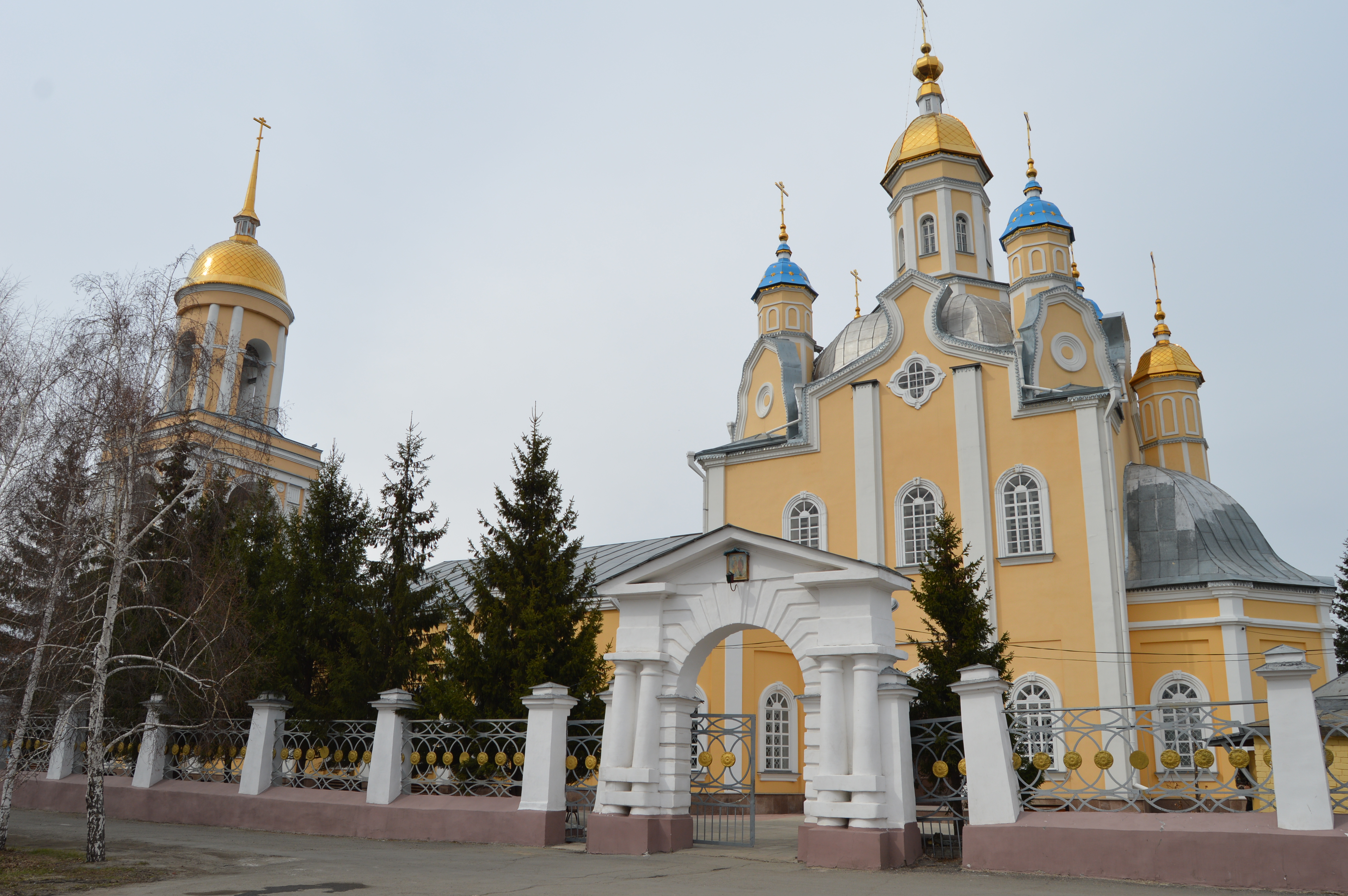
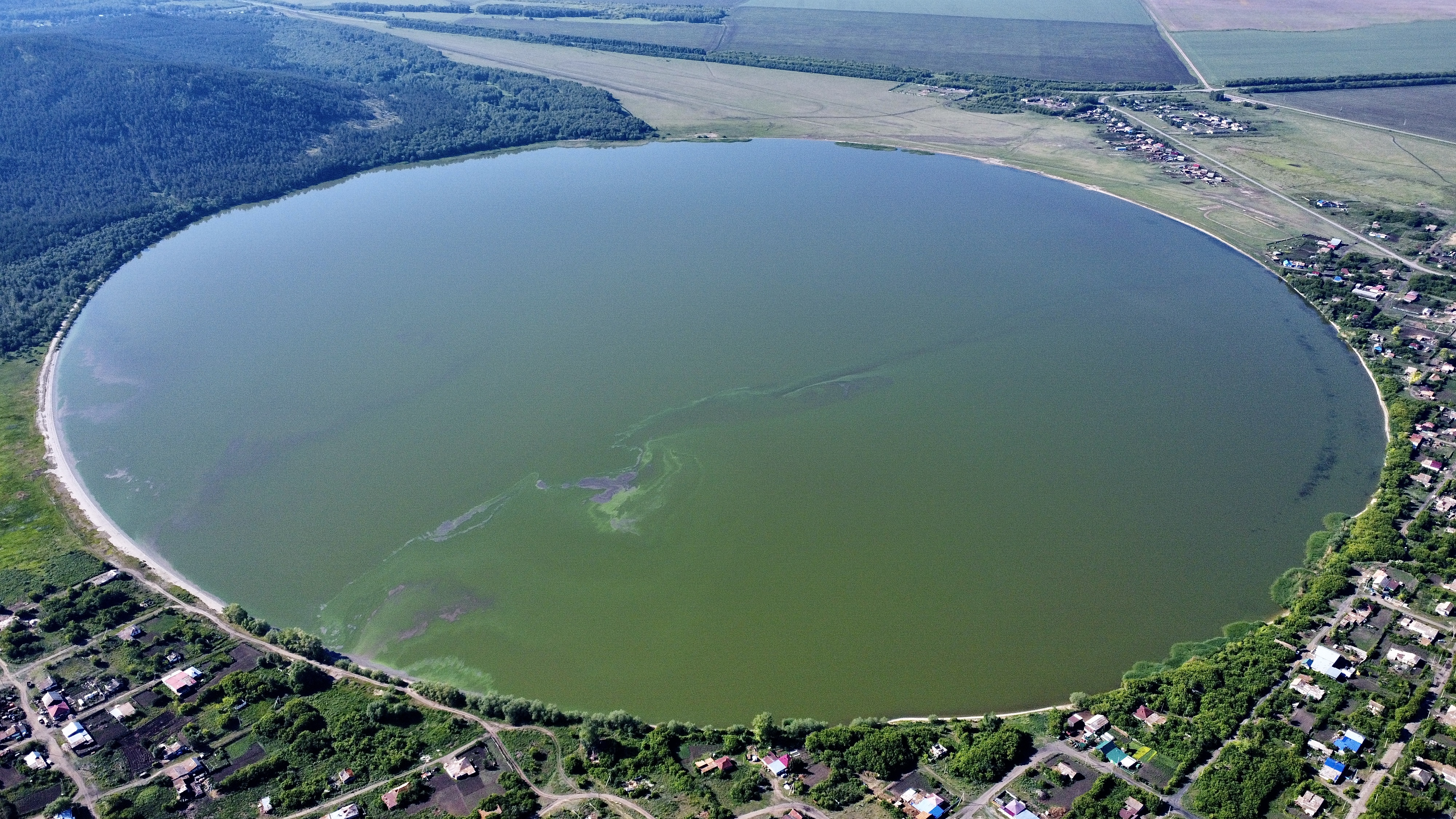
- From the top, Lake Imantau, Saints Peter & Paul Orthodox Cathedral in Petropavlovsk, Lake Arykbalyk

- Flag Coat of arms

- Map of Kazakhstan, location of North Kazakhstan Region highlighted
- Coordinates: 54°53′N 69°10′E
- Country: Kazakhstan
- Date of formation: July 29, 1936
- Capital: Petropavl

Government
  - Akim: Gauez Nurmukhambetov

Area
  - Total: 97,993 km^{2} (37,835 sq mi)

Population (2025-01-01)
  - Total: 522,171
  - Density: 5.3287/km^{2} (13.801/sq mi)

GDP (Nominal, 2024)
  - Total: KZT 2,654 billion (US$ 5.573 billion) · 18th
  - Per capita: KZT 5,044,000 (US$ 10,592)
- Time zone: UTC+5
  - Summer (DST): UTC+5 (not observed)
- Postal codes: 150000
- Area codes: +7 (715)
- ISO 3166 code: KZ-SEV
- Vehicle registration: 15, T
- Districts: 13
- Cities: 5
- Villages: 208
- HDI (2023): 0.850 very high · 3rd
- Website: www.sko.kz

North Kazakhstan Region (Kazakh: Солтүстік Қазақстан облысы, romanized: Soltüstık Qazaqstan oblysy; Russian: Северо-Казахстанская область, romanized: Severo-Kazakhstanskaya oblast) is a region of Kazakhstan with a population of 514,132. Its capital is Petropavl, with a population of 222,113 people. It is the only region of Kazakhstan in which ethnic Kazakhs do not form a majority.

== History ==
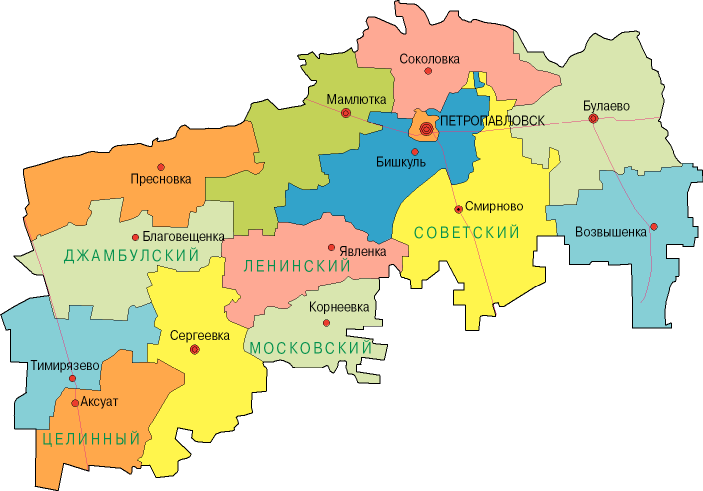
North Kazakhstan region in 1987

During the 19th century, the territory of the region was home to several Middle Zhuz tribes, including Argyns, Kerei, and Kypshak. During the late 19th and early 20th centuries, the region underwent significant resettlement as a result of the opening of the Siberian railway and the Stolypin agrarian reform. As a result, Ukrainians became the majority population in the northern regions of Kazakhstan and the area was referred to as the "Grey Wedge."

In the early 20th century, the North Kazakhstan region was the center of the Akmola province of the Kirghiz Autonomous Soviet Socialist Republic (ASSR). The West Siberian uprising, a large anti-Bolshevik armed uprising, was suppressed by the Reds during this time. The North Kazakhstan region was officially formed from the northern regions of the Karaganda region and the Karkaralinsky district in 1936.

In 1939, the city of Stepnyak and 11 southern districts were ceded to the newly formed Akmola region. In 1966, the North Kazakhstan region was awarded the Order of Lenin. The administrative-territorial reform of 1997 resulted in the inclusion of several districts of the abolished Kokchetav region into the North Kazakhstan region, which had a large proportion of the Kazakh population. The region's structure included modern districts such as Akkayynsky, Esilsky, Zhambylsky, Bulaevsky, and Timiryazevsky, among others, in which the Russian population was predominantly still living.

== Geography ==
The region borders Russia (Omsk Oblast, Kurgan Oblast and Tyumen Oblast) to the north, and also borders three other Kazakhstan regions: Akmola Region to the south, Pavlodar Region to the east and Kostanay Region to the west. The area of the region is 98,040 km^{2} (37,850 sq mi), making it the fourth smallest of all the regions of Kazakhstan. The Kokshetau Hills stretch along the southern part, limited to the north by the West Siberian Plain. The Ishim (Esil) River, a tributary of the Irtysh River, flows from Karagandy Region to Russia through North Kazakhstan Region. The Sileti river also flows through the region.

== Demographics ==
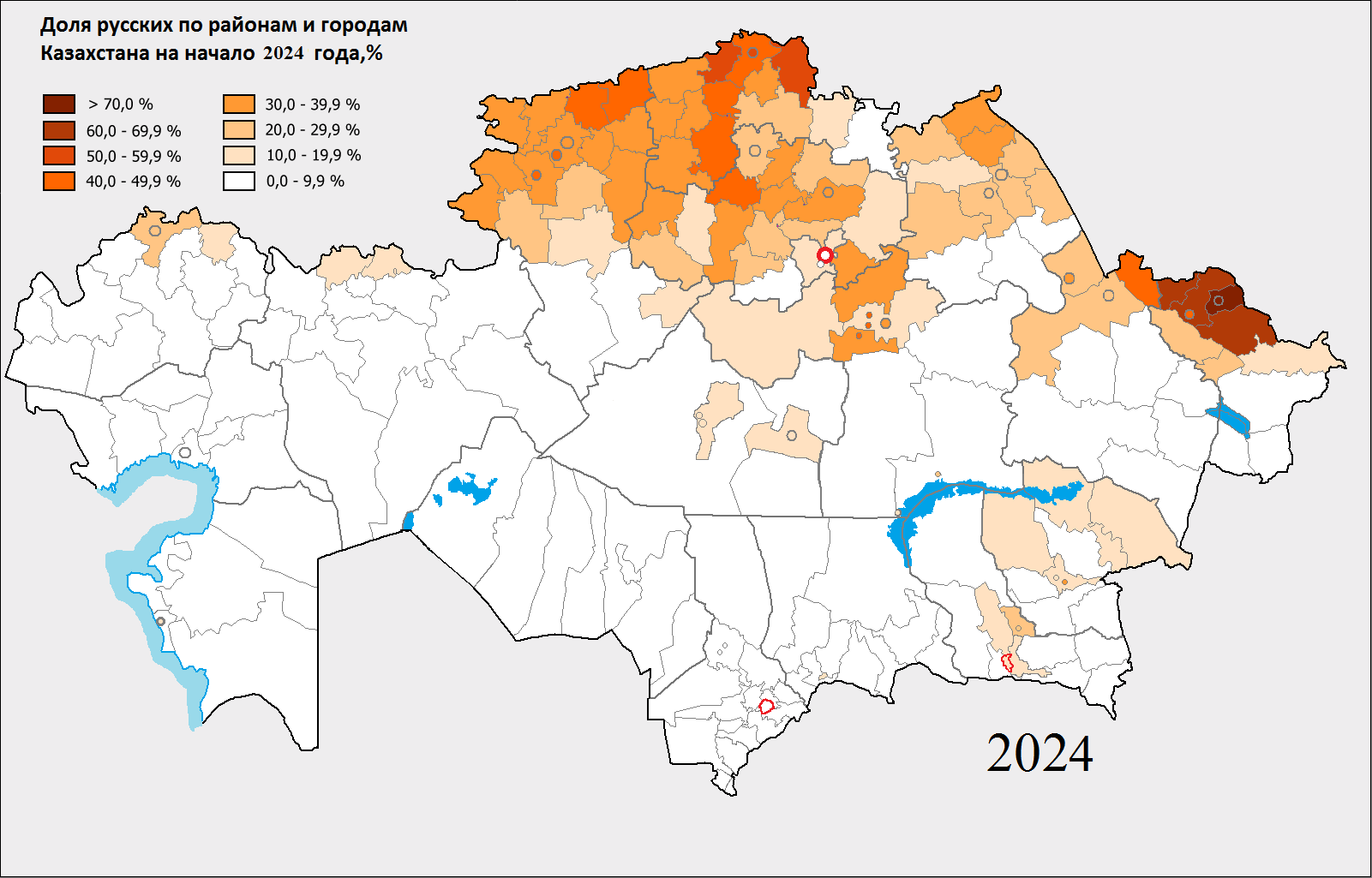
The share Russians by districts and cities of regional and republican subordination Kazakhstan in 2024

Year	Population
1979	884,345
1989	912,065
1999	725,980
2003	682,148
2004	674,497
2005	665,936
2006	663,126
2007	660,950
2008	653,921
2009	597,530
2010	592,746
2011	589,308
2012	583,598
2013	579,636
2014	575,766
2015	571,759
2017	558,700
2021	543,679
2025	522,171
2026	514,132

=== Ethnic groups ===
Ethnic group	2021 census		2026 estimate	
Ethnic group	Population	%	Population	%
Russians	240,567	44.48	231,804	44.60
Kazakhs	203,176	37.57	197,131	37.48
Ukrainians	29,950	5.54	28,035	5.35
Germans	22,207	4.11	21,581	4.16
Tatars	12,099	2.24	11,520	2.21
Poles	11,318	2.09	10,586	2.02
Belarusians	6,805	1.26	6,451	1.24
Azeris	1,721	0.32	1,864	0.37
Other ethnicity or not stated	13,033	2.41	13,199	2.57
Total	540,786	100%	514,132	100%

=== Religion ===
Religion	2021	
Religion	Population	%
Christianity	298,288	55.16
Islam	209,397	38.72
No religion	10,035	1.86
Buddhism	188	0.03
Judaism	123	0.02
Other Religion	832	0.15
Not Stated	21,923	4.05
Total	540,786	100%

== Administrative divisions ==
The region is administratively divided into thirteen districts and the city of Petropavl.

1. Akkayin District, with the administrative center in the selo of Smirnovo;
2. Akzhar District, the selo of Talshik;
3. Aiyrtau District, the selo of Saumalkol;
4. Esil District, the selo of Yavlenka;
5. Gabit Musirepov District, the selo of Novoishim;
6. Kyzylzhar District, the selo of Beskol;
7. Magzhan Zhumabayev District, the town of Bulayevo;
8. Mamlyut District, the town of Mamlyut;
9. Shal akyn District, the town of Sergeyev;
10. Taiynsha District, the town of Taiynsha;
11. Timiryazev District, the selo of Timiryazevo;
12. Ualikhanov District, the selo of Kishkenekol;
13. Zhambyl District, the selo of Presnovka.

The following five localities in North Kazakhstan Region have town status: Petropavl, Bulayevo, Mamlyut, Sergeyev, and Taiynsha.

== Sport ==
The regional bandy team took part in the national championship in 2016.
