= Kamysty (lake) =

Lake in Kazakhstan

- Қамысты
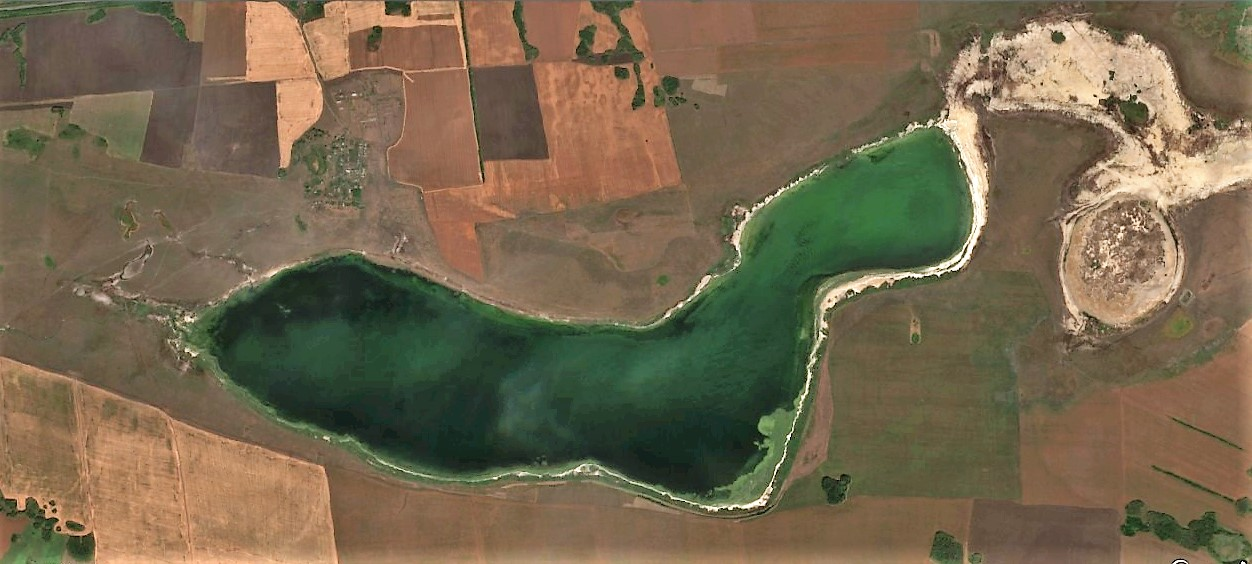
- Sentinel-2 image of the lake in August

- Location within Kazakhstan
- Location: Ishim Plain; West Siberian Plain
- Coordinates: 54°51′16″N 70°09′27″E
- Type: endorheic
- Basin countries: Kazakhstan
- Max. length: 8.3 kilometers (5.2 mi)
- Max. width: 2.1 kilometers (1.3 mi)
- Surface area: 14.4 square kilometers (5.6 sq mi) to 21.7 square kilometers (8.4 sq mi)
- Residence time: UTC+6
- Shore length^{1}: 21.4 kilometers (13.3 mi)
- Surface elevation: 118.7 meters (389 ft)
- ^{1} Shore length is not a well-defined measure.

Kamysty (Kazakh: Қамысты), also known as Kamyshlovo (Russian: Камышлово), is a lake in Magzhan Zhumabayev District, North Kazakhstan Region, Kazakhstan.

Kamysty is located 14 kilometers (8.7 mi) to the WSW of Bulayevo, the district capital. The Kazakhstan–Russia border lies 46 kilometers (29 mi) to the east of the eastern end of the lake.

== Geography ==
Kamysty is an endorheic lake of the Ishim river basin. It lies at the southern edge of the Ishim Plain in the Kamyshlov Log, an alignment of disconnected lakes which is the bed of an ancient river. With a length of over 8 kilometers (5.0 mi) Kamysty is the largest of the lakes in the tract between Petropavl city in Kazakhstan and Isilkul town in Russia. This stretch is roughly aligned from west to east with lake Polovinnoye 2.5 kilometers (1.6 mi) to the west and Bolshoye Solenoye 5 kilometers (3.1 mi) to the east of Kamysty.

The lake is elongated from east to west. Its lakeshore is flat and the water is saline.

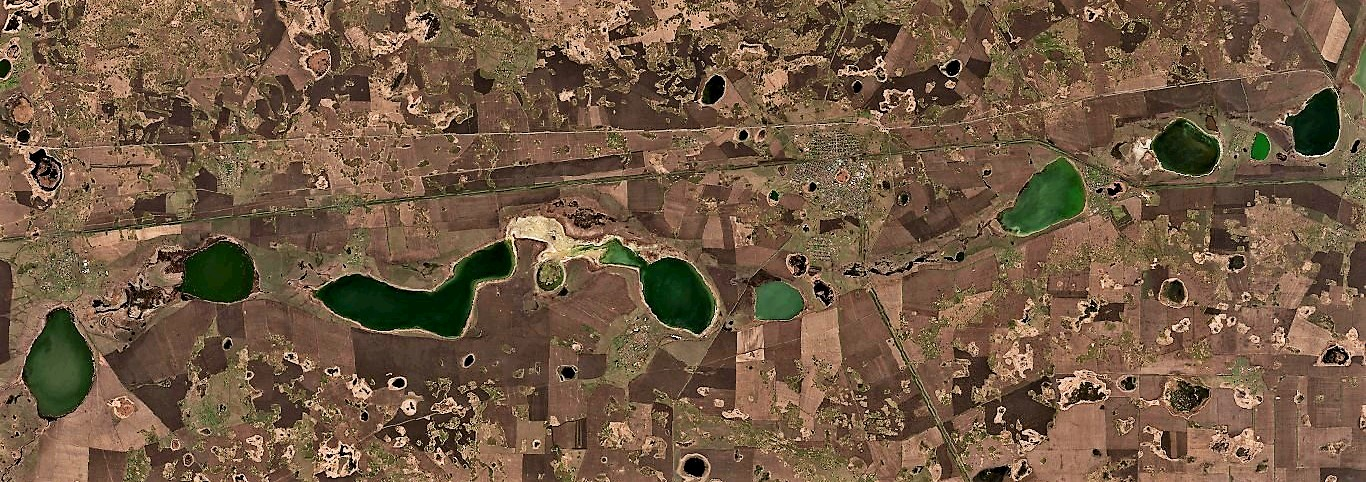
Section of the Kamyshlov Log between Petropavl and Isilkul with lake Kamysty on the left side.

== Flora and fauna ==
Kamysty is surrounded by steppe and clumps of pine forest. There are fish living in the lake waters.

== See also ==
- List of lakes of Kazakhstan
