= Taldyaral =

Lake in Kazakhstan

- Талдыарал
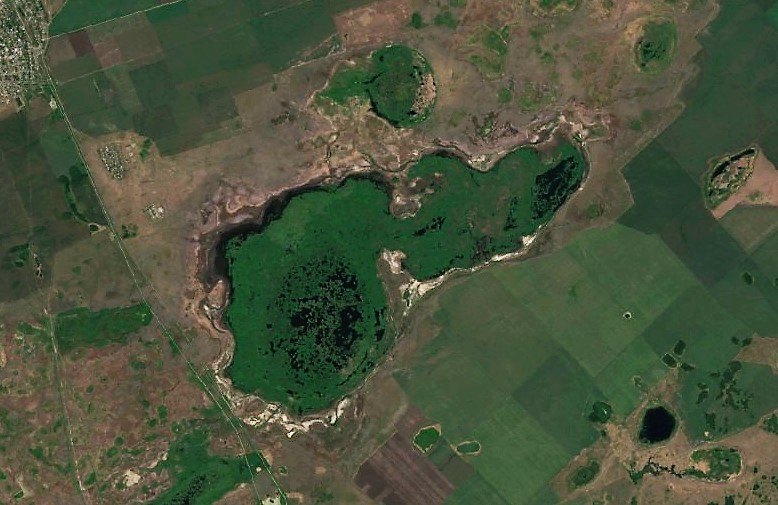
- Sentinel-2 image of the lake.

- Location within Kazakhstan
- Location: Ishim Plain; West Siberian Plain
- Coordinates: 54°28′32″N 69°32′35″E
- Type: endorheic
- Basin countries: Kazakhstan
- Max. length: 9.1 kilometers (5.7 mi)
- Max. width: 3.5 kilometers (2.2 mi)
- Surface area: 20.4 square kilometers (7.9 sq mi) to 21.7 square kilometers (8.4 sq mi)
- Residence time: UTC+6
- Shore length^{1}: 28.3 kilometers (17.6 mi)
- Surface elevation: 128.3 meters (421 ft)
- Settlements: near Smirnovo
- ^{1} Shore length is not a well-defined measure.

Taldyaral (Kazakh: Талдыарал), is a lake in Akkayin District, North Kazakhstan Region, Kazakhstan.

Taldyaral is located 5 kilometers (3.1 mi) to the southeast of Smirnovo, the district capital.

== Geography ==
Taldyaral is an endorheic lake of the Ishim river basin. It lies at the southern edge of the Ishim Plain in the Kamyshlov Log, an alignment of disconnected lakes which is the bed of ancient river Kamyshlov. With a length of over 9 kilometers (5.6 mi) Taldyaral is the largest of the lakes in the tract between lake Ulken Torangyl and Petropavl city. This stretch is roughly aligned from southwest to northeast with lake Zholdyozek 4 kilometers (2.5 mi) to the southwest and Ulken Zharma 12 kilometers (7.5 mi) to the northeast of Taldyaral.

The lake is elongated from northeast to southwest, with a narrower central part. Its lakeshore is flat and the water is saline.

== Flora and fauna ==
Taldyaral is surrounded by steppe. The waters of the lake are encumbered by aquatic vegetation.

== See also ==
- List of lakes of Kazakhstan
