= Kamyshlov Log =

Valley in Western Siberia

Kamyshlov Log Камышловский лог Камыстысай
- Valley
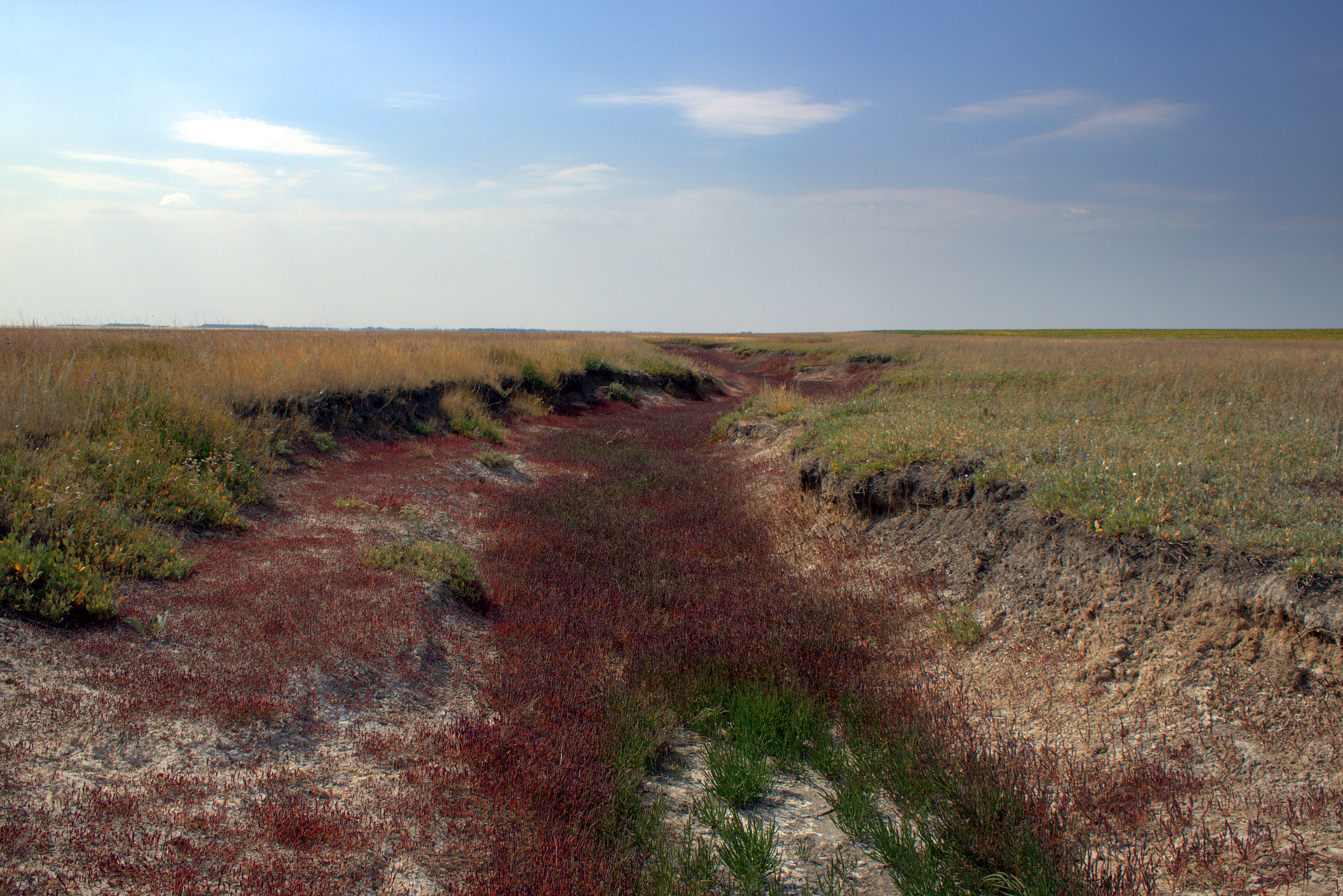
- View of a stretch of the Kamyshlov Log in Maryanovsky District, Omsk Oblast

- Location Kamyshlov Log (Russia)
- Coordinates: 55°0′N 70°50′E
- Location: Kazakhstan, Russia
- Part of: West Siberian Plain

Dimensions
  - Length: 500 km (310 mi)

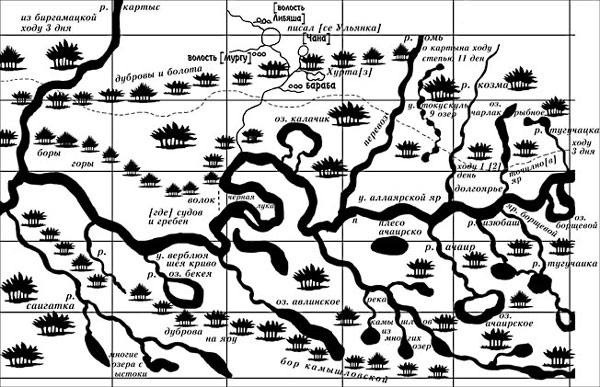
The Kamyshlov River in 1701 according to an illustration by S. U. Remezov.

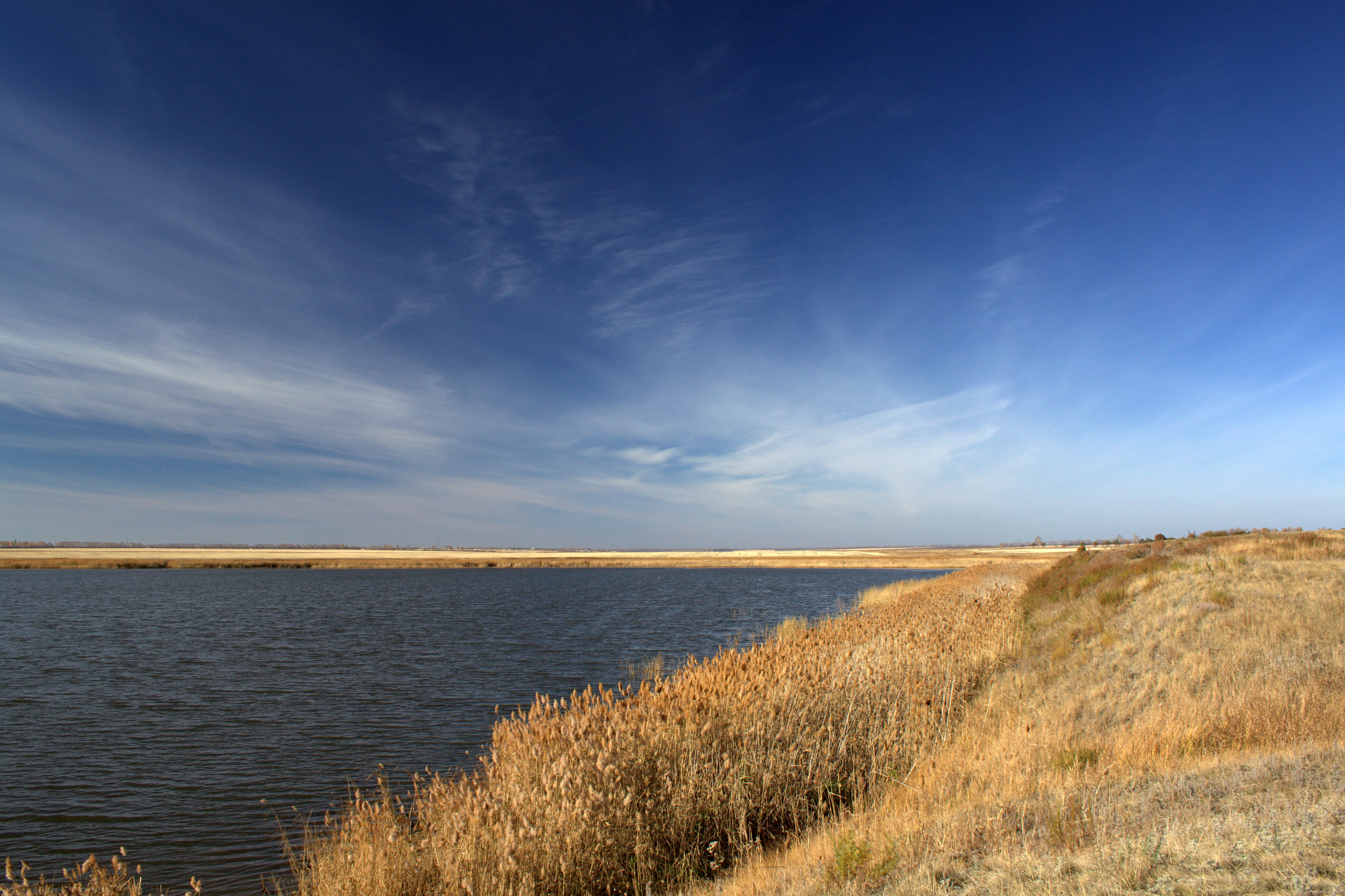
View of Pokrovskoye Lake

The Kamyshlov Log (Russian: Камышловский лог or Урочище Камышловский лог; Kazakh: Камыстысай), is the valley of a disappeared river in Siberia. Administratively it falls within Omsk Oblast, Siberian Federal District, of the Russian Federation, as well as the North Kazakhstan Region of Kazakhstan.

The first geographical observations about the Kamyshlov Log in the early 18th century described it as a flowing river, consisting in a chain of long lakes interconnected by channels, which seasonally dried up, but flowed again during periods of high water. However, by the 19th century most of the surrounding steppe was converted into agricultural fields and the flow between the lakes gradually stopped. The runoff along an almost imperceptible channel last took place in 1865 when the water reached the village of Poludino.

== Geography ==
The Kamyshlov Log is part of the Ishim Plain, West Siberian Plain. It is the 500 km (310 mi) long ancient valley of the Kamyshlov river, which has left a chain of disconnected residual lakes having fresh and briny waters. The course of the now vanished river stretched across the Bozaral Basin, between the Ishim and Irtysh rivers. The upper stretch begins in Kazakhstan, at the Kamysakty river, which flows from the Kokchetav Upland into the Bolshoy Tarangul lake at 54°02′N 68°22′E. The trench runs first roughly northeastwards and then eastwards. It has a width between 1 kilometer (0.62 mi) and 20 kilometers (12 mi), with a depth ranging from 10 meters (33 ft) to 20 meters (66 ft). The lakes are mostly shallow and some dry up in the summer. Some of the main ones are Kamysty, Taldyaral, Ulken Zharma (Үлкен Жарма), Reinfeld, Pokrovskoye, Sandy, Churino, Severnoye, Sergeevskoye, Zheltoye, Ovtsevodskoye, Krugloye and Topkoye.

The steppe and forest-steppe zones of the southern West Siberian Plain have a cyclic intervals of wet and dry spells. Historically, the average duration of a cycle is between 50 and 60 years with each high-water and low-water period lasting from 25 to 30 years. Peaks of high-water periods were observed in 1705–1715, 1750–1760, 1787–1798, 1820–1832, 1856–1870, 1910–1920, 1948–1955, 1985–1992, and peaks of dry periods in 1730–1740, 1767–1778, 1805–1813, 1840–1853, 1875–1885, 1935–1944, 1974–1984. The worst drought was recorded in the 1875-1885 period with catastrophic effects on the water bodies of the region. The water levels were so low that many lakes turned into grassy tracts or desert depressions with sparse vegetation.

== See also ==
- Geography of Russia
