= Poludino =

Poludino Kazakh: Полудино Russian: Полудино
- Location in Kazakhstan
- Coordinates: 54°51′42″N 69°55′05″E
- Country: Kazakhstan
- Region: North Kazakhstan Region
- District: Magzhan Zhumabayev District

Population (2009)
  - Total: 1,492
- Time zone: UTC+6

Poludino (Kazakh: Полудино) is a village located in Magzhan Zhumabayev District in North Kazakhstan Region of Kazakhstan. Population: 1,492 (2009 census results);1,790 (1999 census results).

== Geography ==
Poludino is located 42 km (26 mi) from the district center Bulayevo, and 61 km (38 mi) from the regional center Petropavl. It is located near Lake Pitnoye. Lake Polovinnoye is located 4.6 km to the east.

== History ==
Poludino is the location of Poludinskaya fortress, which was founded at the same time as Petropavlovsk in 1752. According to one version, it got its name because the topographic expedition arrived from Petropavlovsk at noon. The Poludinskaya fortress was located between Petropavlovsk and the Lebyazhinskaya fortress, and in addition to them, there were several more redoubts on this section of the Presnogorkovskaya fortified line. The fortress was built according to the method of the French engineer Vaubon. After 100 years, the fortress was liquidated as unnecessary. The village of Poludennaya, which arose in this way, later became a volost center.
