= Kamysakty =

River in Kazakhstan

Kamysakty Қамысақты
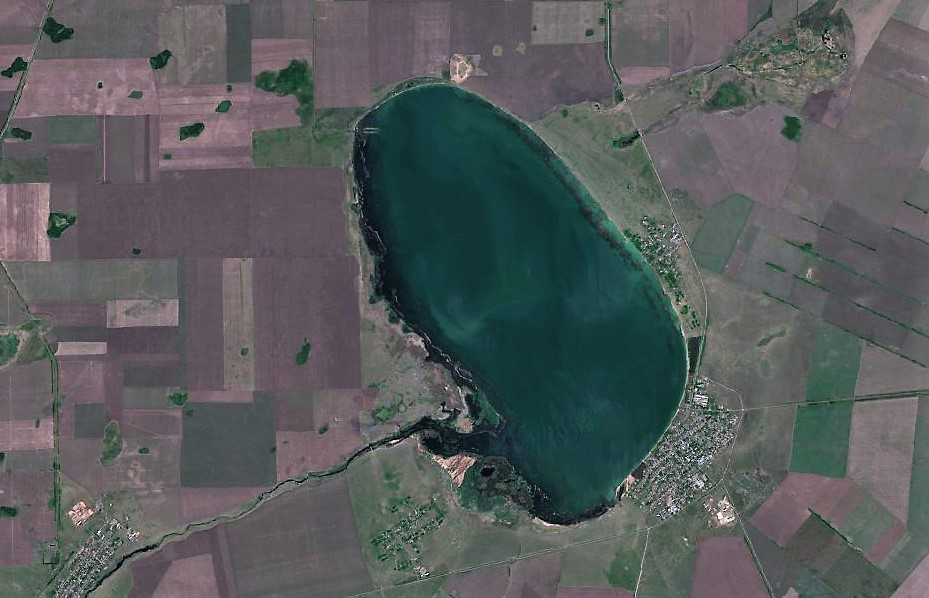
- Kamysakty final stretch and mouth in the Ulken Torangyl SW lakeshore Sentinel-2 image.

- Mouth location in Kazakhstan

Location
- Countries: Kazakhstan

Physical characteristics
- Source: Kokshetau Hills
  - coordinates: 53°24′28″N 68°17′47″E
  - elevation: 291 m (955 ft)
- Mouth: Ulken Torangyl
  - coordinates: 54°00′28″N 68°21′38″E
  - elevation: 147 m (482 ft)
- Length: 106 km (66 mi)
- Basin size: 1,800 km^{2} (690 sq mi)

The Kamysakty (Kazakh: Қамысақты; Russian: Камысакты) is a river in the Aiyrtau and Esil districts, North Kazakhstan Region, Kazakhstan. It is 106 kilometres (66 mi) long and has a catchment area of 1,800 square kilometres (690 sq mi).

Until 1865 the Kamysakty formed the uppermost stretch of the Kamyshlov, a former left tributary of the Irtysh. Its ancient valley can be traced by a residual chain of lakes for almost 500 kilometers (310 mi) all the way to the Irtysh. The river is currently part of the Ishim Water Management Basin.

== Course ==
The Kamysakty belongs to the Ishim River basin. It has its sources on the northwestern slopes of the Kokshetau Hills, close to lake Ulken Koskol. The river heads roughly northwards most of its course. In its final stretch it bends northeastwards and enters the southwestern shore of lake Ulken Torangyl from the west.

The width of the river valley is between 100 m (330 ft) and 300 m (980 ft). The channel is between 10 m (33 ft) and 40 m (130 ft), with the banks bound by low cliffs in stretches. These are not higher than 4 m (13 ft). Kamysakty is fed mainly by snow. During seasonal summer droughts the river stops flowing and breaks up into pools along its entire length.

== See also ==
- Kamyshlov Log
- List of rivers of Kazakhstan
