= Rus' land =

Rus' land may refer to:

- Ruthenia, a designation for the historical lands of the Rus'
- Rus' land (Rus' chronicles), a term used in Rus' chronicles to describe the core territory of Kievan Rus'
- Land of Russia:
  - Territorial evolution of Russia
  - Geography of Russia, the land of the Russian Federation

== See also ==
- Russia
