= Akkayin District =

Coordinates: 54.517488°N 69.418262°E

Akkayin
- District
- Аққайың ауданы
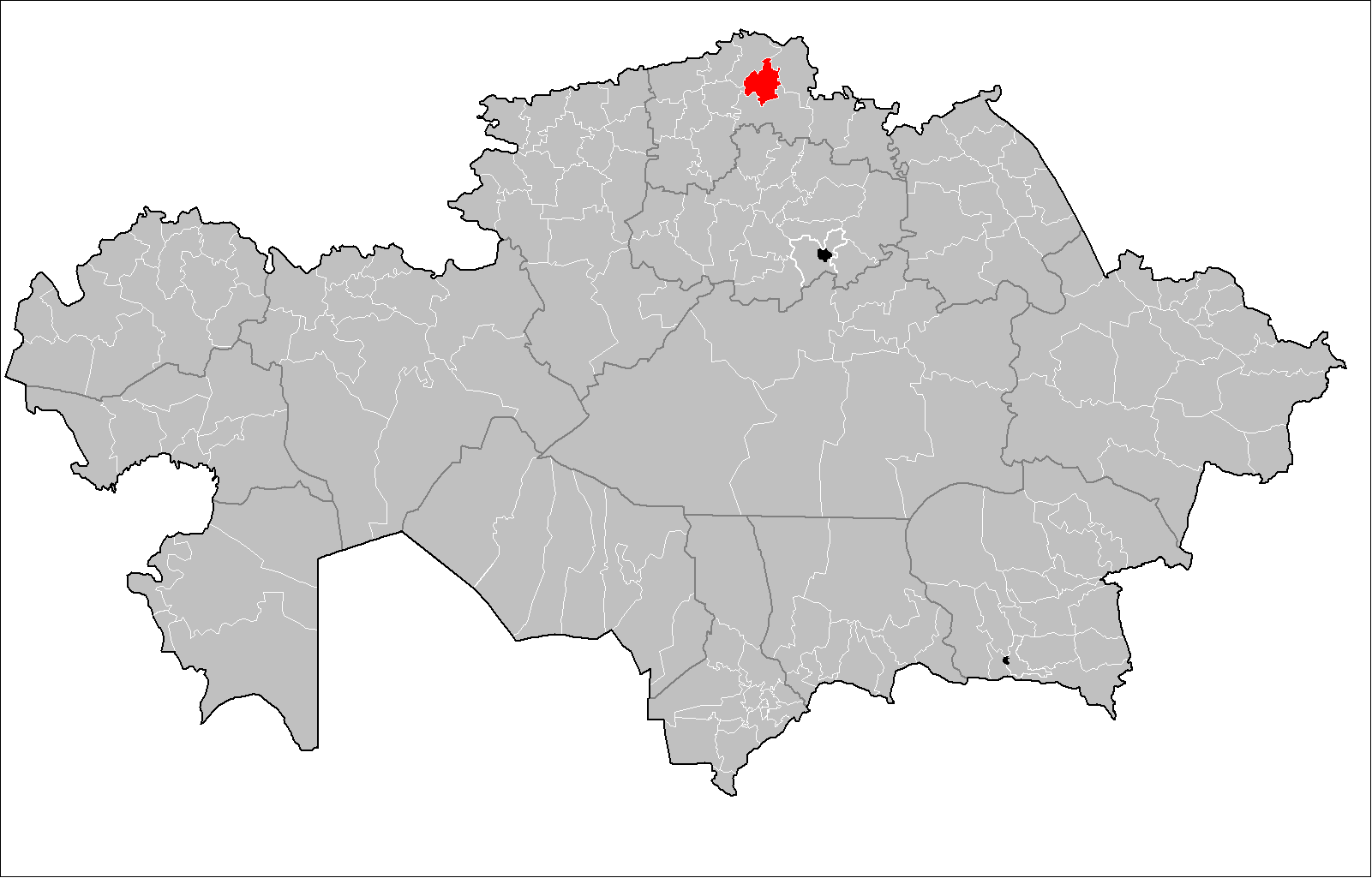
- Country: Kazakhstan
- Region: North Kazakhstan Region
- Administrative center: Smirnovo

Government
  - Akim: Zhanar Qusaiyn

Population (2013)
  - Total: 21,535
- Time zone: UTC+6 (East)

Akkayin (Kazakh: Аққайың ауданы Aqqaiyñ audany) is a district of North Kazakhstan Region in northern Kazakhstan. The administrative center of the district is the selo of Smirnovo. Population: 21,535 (2013 estimate); 22,941 (2009 census results); 31,705 (1999 census results).

== Geography ==
Lake Taldyaral and part of Shaglyteniz are located in the district.
