= Smirnovo (North Kazakhstan Region) =

Smirnovo Смирново
- Village
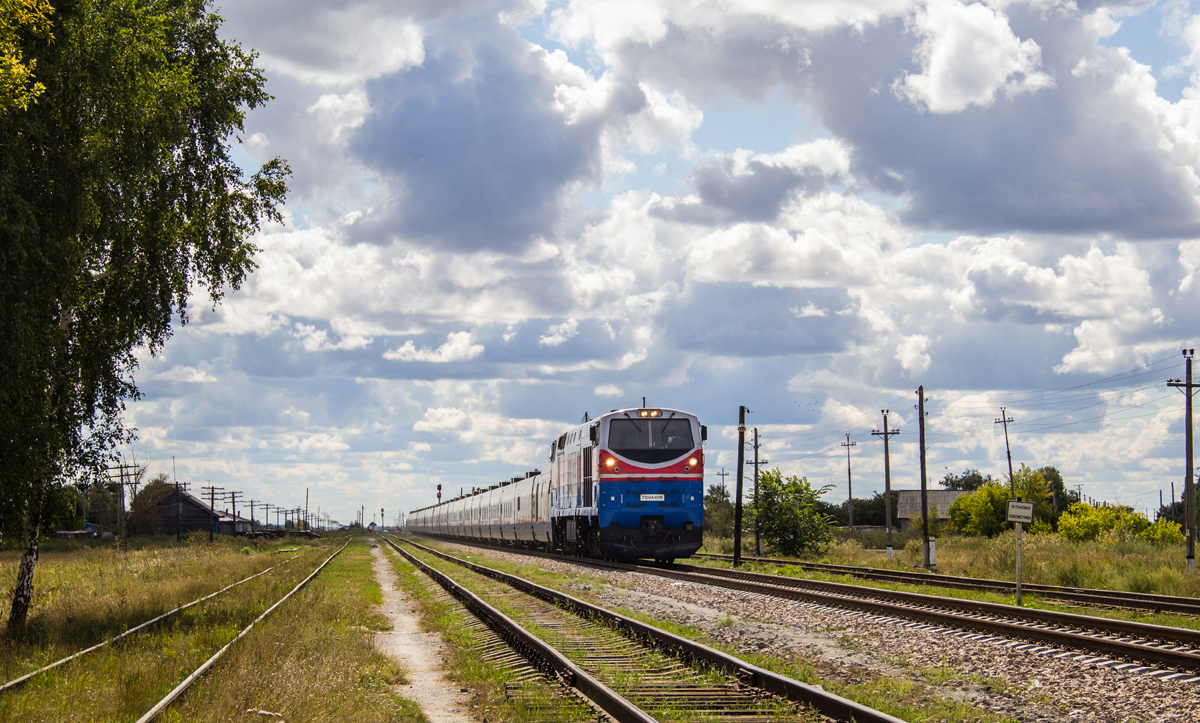
- Train at Smirnovo railway station

- Location in Kazakhstan
- Coordinates: 54°30′42″N 69°25′05″E
- Country: Kazakhstan
- Region: North Kazakhstan Region
- District: Akkayin District
- Rural District: Smirnov Rural District

Population (2021)
  - Total: 5,341
- Time zone: UTC+6 (East Kazakhstan Time)
- Post code: 150300

Smirnovo (Kazakh: Смирново) is a village and the administrative center of Akkayin District, North Kazakhstan Region, Kazakhstan. It is also the head of Smirnov Rural District (KATO code - 594630100). It was founded in the early 19th century as Darmin. Population: 5,796 (2009 census results); 7,556 (1999 census results).

== Geography ==
Smirnovo lies at the southern end of the West Siberian Plain, 45 kilometers (28 mi) to the SSE of Petropavl city. Lake Taldyaral lies 5 kilometers (3.1 mi) to the southeast.
