= Yavlenka =

Yavlenka Явленка
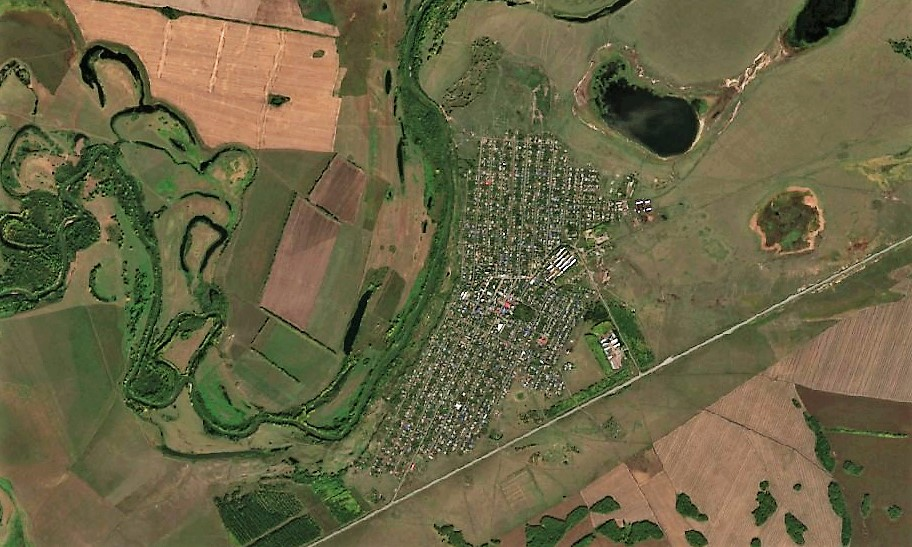
- Sentinel-2 image of Yavlenka and the Ishim River

- Location in Kazakhstan
- Coordinates: 54°20′49″N 68°27′25″E
- Country: Kazakhstan
- Region: North Kazakhstan Region
- District: Esil District
- Rural District: Yavlen Rural District
- Settled: 1875

Population (2023)
  - Total: 5,952
- Time zone: UTC+6 (East Kazakhstan Time)
- Postcode: 150500

Yavlenka (Kazakh: Явленка) is a town and the administrative center of Esil District, North Kazakhstan Region of Kazakhstan. It is the administrative center and the only settlement of the Yavlen rural district. KATO code - 594230100. Population: 5,630 (2009 census results); 6,106 (1999 census results).

== Geography ==
Yavlenka is located on the right bank of the Ishim River, 78 kilometers (48 mi) southwest of Petropavl city, the capital of the region. Lake Alua lies 8 kilometers (5.0 mi) to the northwest and Ulken Torangyl 30 kilometers (19 mi) to the SSW.
