= Alua (lake) =

Salt lake in Kazakhstan

- Алуа
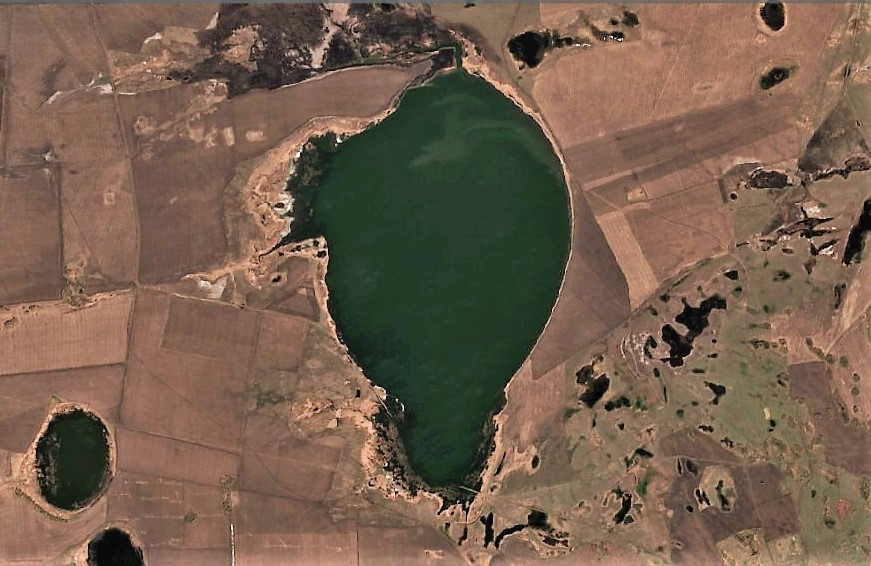
- Sentinel-2 image of the lake

- Location within Kazakhstan
- Location: Ishim Plain
- Coordinates: 54°23′24″N 68°16′31″E
- Type: endorheic
- Primary outflows: none
- Basin countries: Kazakhstan
- Max. length: 4.4 kilometers (2.7 mi)
- Max. width: 2.7 kilometers (1.7 mi)
- Surface area: 7.7 square kilometers (3.0 sq mi)
- Residence time: UTC+6
- Shore length^{1}: 11.8 kilometers (7.3 mi)
- Surface elevation: 117.5 meters (385 ft)
- Islands: none
- Settlements: Yavlenka
- ^{1} Shore length is not a well-defined measure.

Alua (Kazakh: Алуа; Russian: Алва) is a salt lake in Esil District, North Kazakhstan Region, Kazakhstan.

The lake is located 8 kilometers (5.0 mi) to the NW of Yavlenka town, the administrative center of the district. Small Amangeldi village lies 3 kilometers (1.9 mi) to the southeast of the eastern lakeshore.

== Legend ==
"Alua" is an ethnic Kazakh girl's name. According to local folklore, a young man named Zharylkamys fell in love with a girl named Alua and decided to marry her even though their clans adamantly opposed the union. Eventually the lovers ran away and hid in a thicket by the eastern lakeside, but Zharylkamys was found and killed by the clansmen chasing them. Seeing her lover dead, Alua committed suicide. Following the tragic outcome the lovers were buried at that same spot and as years went by the lake was named after the girl. This legend was collected by Sabit Mukanov in his autobiographical trilogy School of Life.

== Geography ==
Alua is an endorheic lake belonging to the Ishim River basin. It is located at the southern edge of the Ishim Plain. The shores are flat and the bottom of the lake is muddy.

The lake is surrounded by agricultural fields and pasture land. It is fed by rain and snow. Lake Menkeser lies 20 kilometers (12 mi) to the NW and Stanovoye 35 kilometers (22 mi) to the north.

== Flora and fauna ==
Some stretches of the lakeshore are overgrown with reeds. The mute swan is one of the bird species sighted at the lake.

== See also ==
- List of lakes of Kazakhstan
