= Geography of Russia =

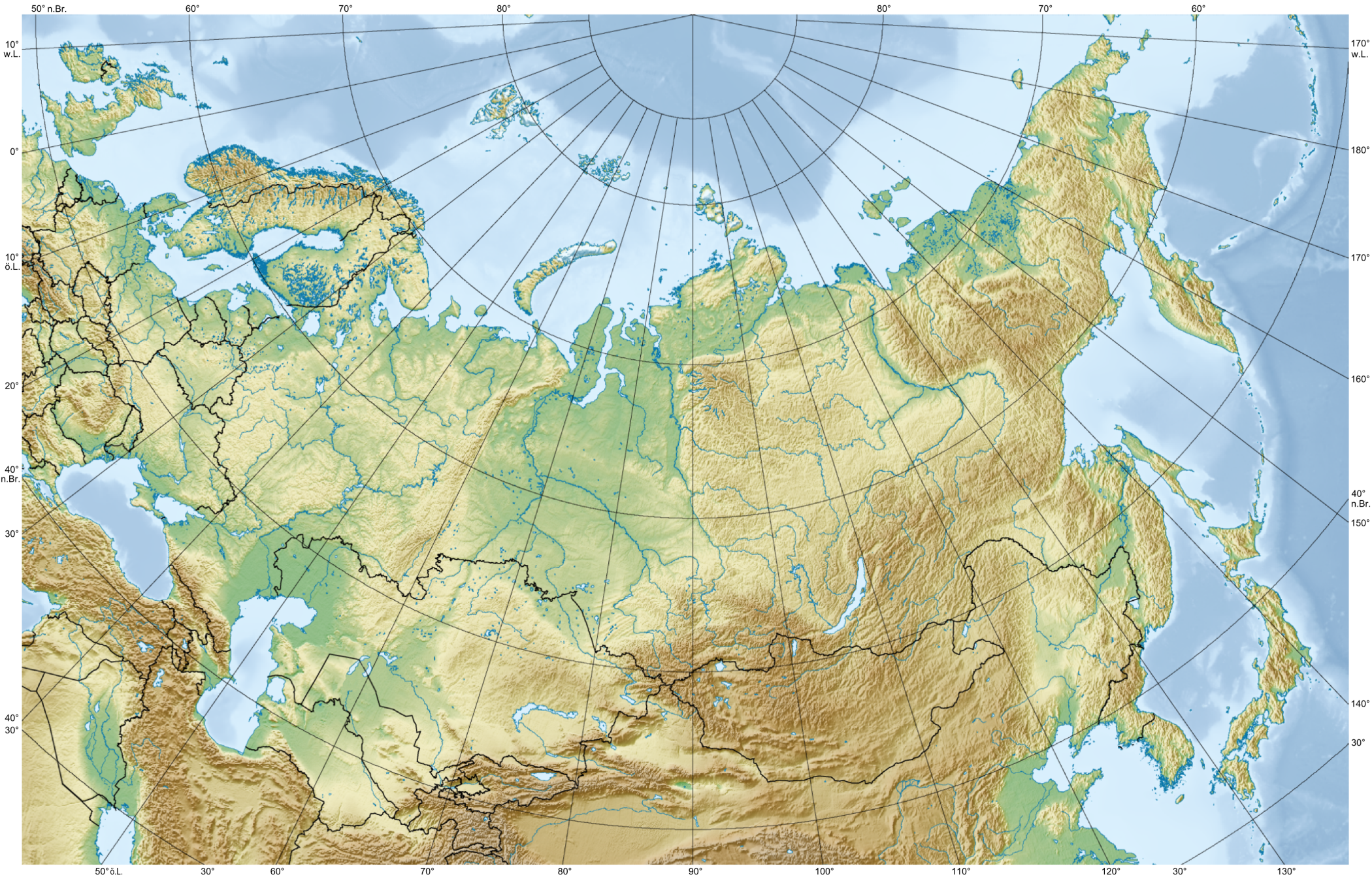
- Continent: Europe and Asia
- Region: Eastern Europe (European Russia); Northern Asia (Siberia)
- Coordinates: 60°00′N 100°00′E
- Area
  - Land: 95.78%
  - Water: 4.22%
- Coastline: 37,654 km (23,397 mi)
- Borders: Poland 204.1 km (126.8 mi) Lithuania 266 km (165 mi); Norway 195.8 km (121.7 mi); Finland 1,271.8 km (790.3 mi); Estonia 138 km (86 mi); Latvia 280.5 km (174.3 mi); Belarus 1,239 km (770 mi); Ukraine 1,925.8 km (1,196.6 mi); Georgia 875.5 km (544.0 mi); Azerbaijan 372.6 km (231.5 mi); Kazakhstan 7,512.8 km (4,668.2 mi); China 4,209.3 km (2,615.5 mi) (Note: Russia shares two separate land borders with China, the much shorter western section is further west than its land border with Mongolia.); Mongolia 3,485 km (2,165 mi); North Korea 17 km (11 mi); Japan United States
- Highest point: Mount Elbrus; 5,642 m (18,510 ft)
- Lowest point: Caspian Sea, −28 m (−92 ft)
- Longest river: Yenisei–Angara–Selenge, 5,539 km (3,442 mi)
- Largest lake: Lake Baikal; 31,722 km^{2} (12,248 sq mi)
- Climate: European Russia and Siberia: mostly cool climate Extreme north: tundra Extreme southeast: temperate continental
- Terrain: Most of Russia consists of two plains (the East European Plain and the West Siberian Plain), two lowlands (the North Siberian and the Kolyma, in far northeastern Siberia), two plateaus (the Central Siberian Plateau and the Lena Plateau to its east), and a series of mountainous areas mainly concentrated in the extreme northeast or extending intermittently along the southern border.
- Natural resources: Oil, gas, coal, timber, metals, diamonds, copper, lead, zinc, bauxite, nickel, tin, mercury, gold, silver, platinum, titanium, manganese, potash, uranium, cobalt, molybdenum, tungsten, aluminum, polymetals, chromium, phosphates, apatites, talc, asbestos, mica, salt, amber, precious and semiprecious stones, sand, clay, limestone, marble, granite, iron ore, arable land, tobacco, tea, citrus fruit, hydroelectricity, fresh water, fruits, and vegetables.
- Natural hazards: Earthquakes, landslides, storms, hurricanes, forest fires, and floods.
- Environmental issues: Deforestation, energy irresponsibility, pollution, and nuclear waste.
- Exclusive economic zone: 7,566,673 km^{2} (2,921,509 mi^{2})

Russia (Russian: Россия) is the largest country in the world, covering over 17,098,242 square kilometers (6,601,668 sq mi), encompassing more than one-eighth of Earth's inhabited land area (excludes Antarctica). Russia extends across eleven time zones, and has the most borders of any country in the world, with sixteen sovereign nations. (Note: Russia shares land borders with fourteen sovereign nations: Norway and Finland to the northwest; Estonia, Latvia, Belarus and Ukraine to the west, as well as Lithuania and Poland (with Kaliningrad); Georgia and Azerbaijan to the southwest; Kazakhstan and Mongolia to the south; China and North Korea to the southeast—while having maritime boundaries with Japan and the United States. Russia also shares borders with the two partially recognized breakaway states of South Ossetia and Abkhazia.)

Russia is a transcontinental country, stretching vastly over two continents, Europe and Asia. It spans the northernmost edge of Eurasia, and has the world's fourth-longest coastline, at 37,653 kilometers (23,396 mi). (Note: Russia has an additional 850 kilometers (530 mi) of coastline along the Caspian Sea, which is the world's largest inland body of water, and has been variously classified as a sea or a lake.) Russia, alongside Canada and the United States, is one of only three countries with a coast along three oceans, due to which it has links with over thirteen marginal seas. (Note: Russia borders, clockwise, to its southwest: the Black Sea and the Sea of Azov; to its west: the Baltic Sea; to its north: the Barents Sea, the Kara Sea, the Laptev Sea, the Pechora Sea, the White Sea, and the East Siberian Sea; to its northeast: the Chukchi Sea and the Bering Sea; and to its southeast: the Sea of Okhotsk and the Sea of Japan.) It lies between latitudes 41° and 82° N, and longitudes 19° E and 169° W. Russia is larger than three continents of the world (Note: Russia, by land area, is larger than the continents of Australia, Antarctica, and Europe; although it covers a large part of the latter itself.) and has about the same surface area as Pluto. Russia encompasses, by far, the largest forest area of any country in the world.

== Global position and boundaries ==
Russia on the globe

Kaliningrad Oblast, the westernmost part of Russia along the Baltic Sea, is about 9,000 kilometers (5,600 mi) apart from its easternmost part, Big Diomede Island in the Bering Strait. From north to south, the country ranges from the northern tip of the Russian Arctic islands at Franz Josef Land to the southern tip of the Republic of Dagestan on the Caspian Sea, spanning about 4,500 kilometers (2,800 mi) of extremely varied, often inhospitable terrain.

Extending for 57,792 kilometers (35,910 mi), the Russian border is the world's longest. Along the 20,139-kilometer (12,514-mile) land frontier, Russia has boundaries with 14 countries: Poland and Lithuania (both via Kaliningrad Oblast), Norway, Finland, Estonia, Latvia, Belarus, Ukraine, Georgia, Azerbaijan, Kazakhstan, China, Mongolia, and North Korea.

Approximately two-thirds of the frontier is bounded by seawater. Virtually all of the lengthy northern coast is well above the Arctic Circle; except for the port of Murmansk—which receives currents that are somewhat warmer than would be expected at that latitude, due to the effects of the Gulf Stream—that coast is locked in ice much of the year. Thirteen seas and parts of two oceans—the Arctic and Pacific—wash Russian shores. It is separated by close sea, making it a maritime boundary. It also shares one with Japan.

== Administrative and territorial divisions ==
With a few changes of status, most of the Soviet Union's administrative and territorial divisions of the Russian Republic were retained in constituting the Russian Federation. As of 2014, there were eighty-three administrative territorial divisions (called federal subjects): twenty-two republics, nine krais (territories), forty-six oblasts (provinces), one autonomous oblast, four autonomous okrugs, and three cities with federal status, namely the cities of Moscow, Saint Petersburg, and Sevastopol. The inclusion of Crimea as a republic, and Sevastopol as a federal city is disputed, with the Secretary General of NATO claiming, "Crimea's annexation is illegal and illegitimate and NATO Allies will not recognise it."

The republics include a wide variety of peoples, including northern Europeans, Tatars, Caucasus peoples, and indigenous Siberians. The largest federal subjects are in Siberia. Located in east-central Siberia, the Sakha Republic (Yakutia) is the largest federal subject in the country (and the largest country subdivision in the world), twice the size of Alaska. Second in size is Krasnoyarsk Krai, located west of Sakha in Siberia. Kaliningrad Oblast, which is a noncontiguous constituent entity of Russia, is the smallest oblast. This is both the smallest republic and the smallest federal subject of Russia except for the three federal cities. The two most populous federal subjects, Moscow Oblast (with Moscow) and Krasnodar Krai, are in European Russia.

== Human geography ==
=== Demographics ===
Russia had a population of 141.18 million according to the 2010 census, which rose to 146.2 million as of 2021 following the annexation of Crimea in 2014. It is the most populous country in Europe, and the ninth-most populous country in the world; with a population density of 9 inhabitants per square kilometre (23 inhabitants/mi^{2}).

=== Urban areas ===
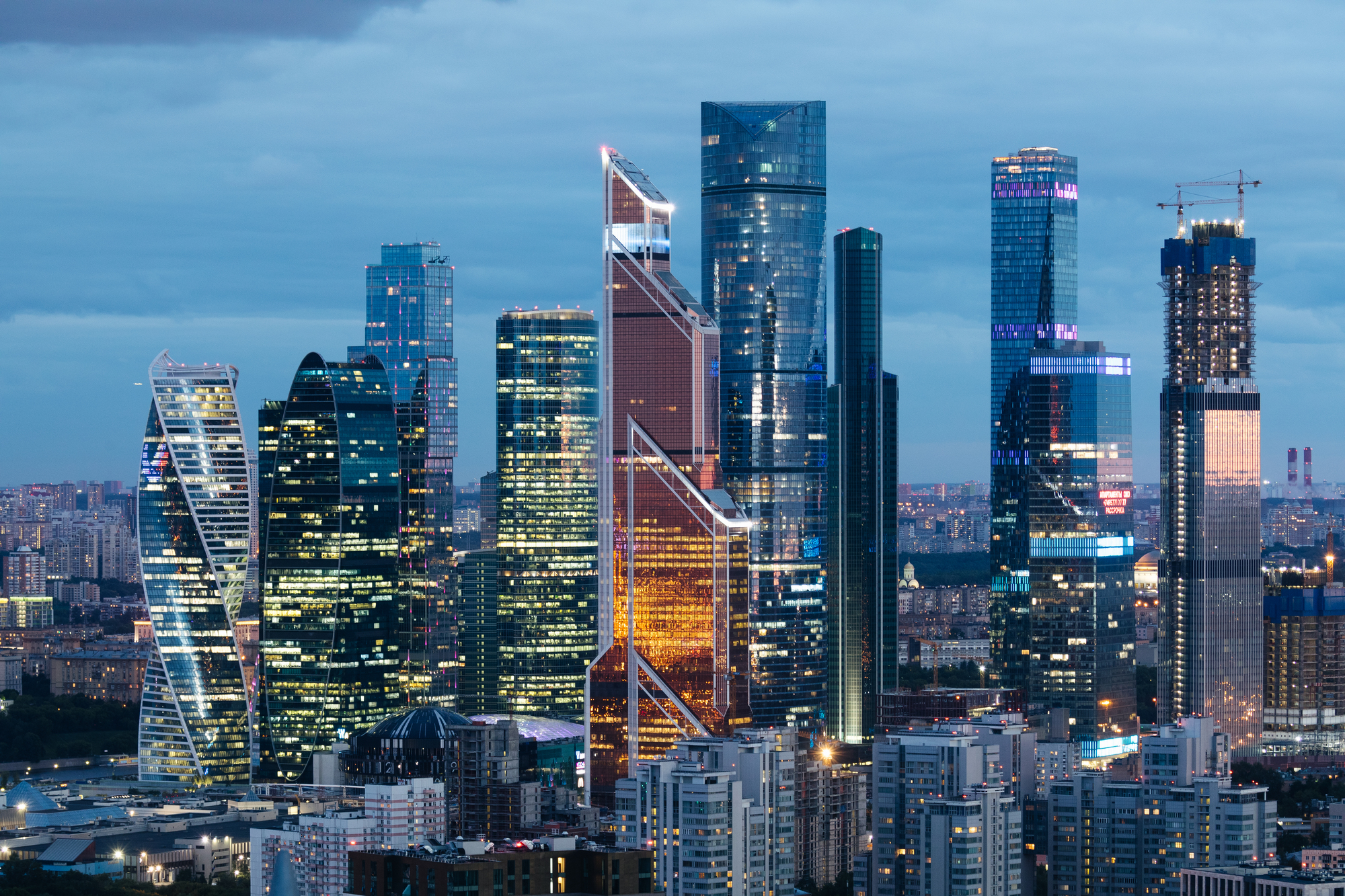
Moscow, the capital and largest city of Russia

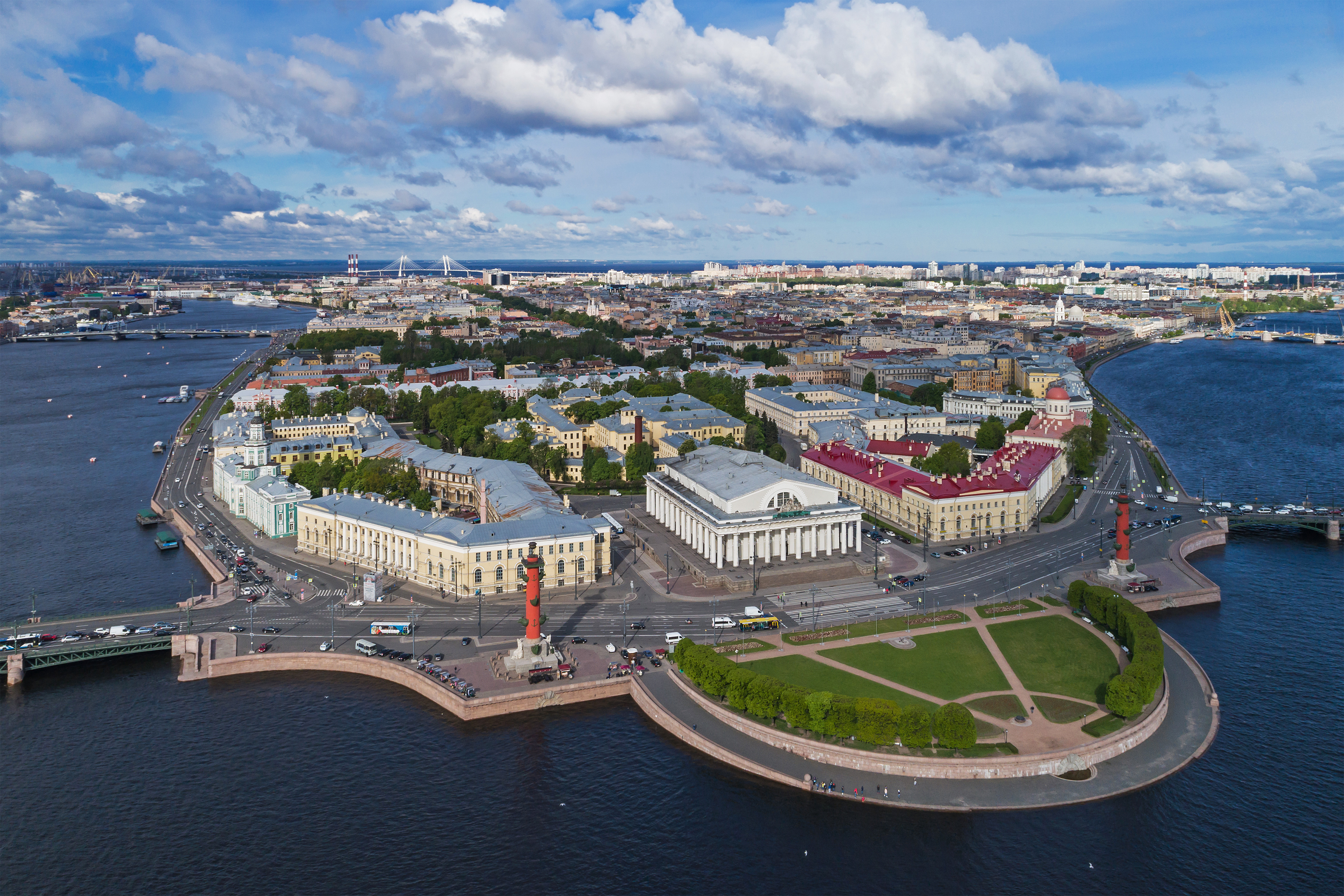
Saint Petersburg, the cultural capital and the second-largest city

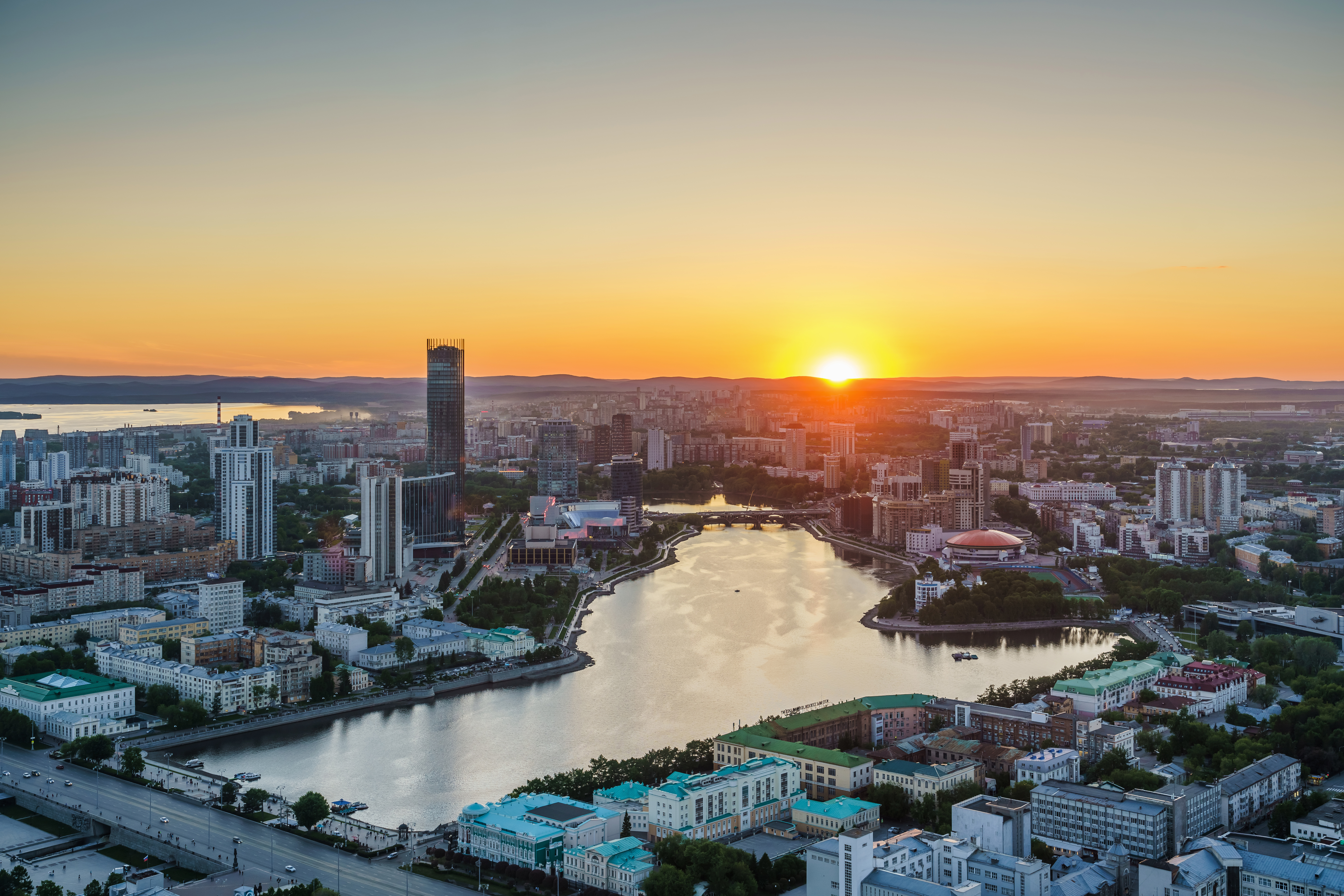
Yekaterinburg, the fourth-largest city in the country.

Russia is one of the world's most urbanized countries, with roughly 75% of its total population living in urban areas. Moscow, the capital and largest city, has a population estimated at 12.4 million residents within the city limits, while over 17 million residents in the urban area, and over 20 million residents in the metropolitan area. Moscow is among the world's largest cities, being the most populous city entirely within Europe, the most populous urban area in Europe, the most populous metropolitan area in Europe, and also the largest city by land area on the European continent. Saint Petersburg, the cultural capital, is the second-largest city, with a population of roughly 5.4 million inhabitants. Other major urban areas are Yekaterinburg, Novosibirsk, Kazan, Nizhny Novgorod, and Chelyabinsk.

— from 10 000 000 people

— from 2 000 000 to 6 000 000 people
— from 1 000 000 to 2 000 000 people
— from 600 000 to 1 000 000 people

Russian cities with a population of 600,000 or more (according to 2021 Russian census)

Largest cities or towns in Russia 2025 estimate
Rank	Name	Federal subject	Pop.	Rank	Name	Federal subject	Pop.
1	Moscow	Moscow	13,274,285	11	Samara	Samara Oblast	1,154,223
2	Saint Petersburg	Saint Petersburg	5,652,922	12	Rostov-on-Don	Rostov Oblast	1,143,123
3	Novosibirsk	Novosibirsk Oblast	1,637,266	13	Omsk	Omsk Oblast	1,101,367
4	Yekaterinburg	Sverdlovsk Oblast	1,548,187	14	Voronezh	Voronezh Oblast	1,041,722
5	Kazan	Tatarstan	1,329,825	15	Perm	Perm Krai	1,027,518
6	Krasnoyarsk	Krasnoyarsk Krai	1,211,756	16	Volgograd	Volgograd Oblast	1,012,219
7	Nizhny Novgorod	Nizhny Novgorod Oblast	1,198,245	17	Saratov	Saratov Oblast	886,165
8	Chelyabinsk	Chelyabinsk Oblast	1,176,770	18	Tyumen	Tyumen Oblast	872,077
9	Ufa	Bashkortostan	1,166,098	19	Tolyatti	Samara Oblast	662,683
10	Krasnodar	Krasnodar Krai	1,154,885	20	Makhachkala	Dagestan	625,322

== Physiography and hydrography ==
Geographers traditionally divide the vast territory of Russia into five natural zones: the tundra zone; the taiga, or forest, zone; the steppe, or plains, zone; the arid zone; and the mountain zone. Most of Russia consists of two plains (the East European Plain and the West Siberian Plain), three lowlands (the North Siberian, the Central Yakutian and the East Siberian), two plateaus (the Central Siberian Plateau and the Lena Plateau), and two systems of mountainous areas (the East Siberian Mountains in far northeastern Siberia and the South Siberian Mountains along the southern border).

=== Ecoregions ===
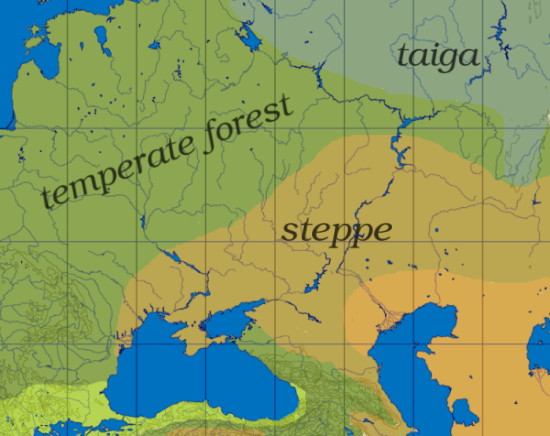
The wider area of the Urals, showing the transition of temperate forest, taiga, steppe and semi-desert

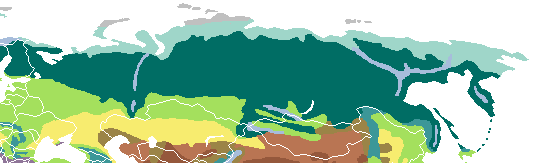
Ice sheet and polar desert
Tundra
Alpine tundra
Taiga
Montane forest
Temperate broadleaf and mixed forest
Temperate steppe
Dry steppe
Russia's 49 outlined terrestrial ecoregions, each of a colored biome, stretch across the Palearctic realm of Eurasia. Russia contains 8 of 14 terrestrial biomes, or major habitat types, as defined by Olson & Dinerstein, et al. (2001).
01. Tropical and subtropical moist broadleaf forests
02. Tropical and subtropical dry broadleaf forests
03. Tropical and subtropical coniferous forests
04. Temperate broadleaf and mixed forests
05. Temperate coniferous forests
06. Taiga and Boreal forest
07. Tropical and subtropical grasslands, savannas, and shrublands
08. Temperate grasslands, savannas, and shrublands
09. Flooded grasslands and savannas
10. Montane grasslands and shrublands
11. Tundra
12. Mediterranean forests, woodlands, and scrub
13. Deserts and xeric shrublands
14. Mangroves
Rock and Ice, or Abiotic Land Zones

==== East European plain ====
The East European Plain encompasses most of European Russia. The West Siberian Plain, which is the world's largest, extends east from the Urals to the Yenisei River. Because the terrain and vegetation are relatively uniform in each of the natural zones, Russia presents an illusion of uniformity. Nevertheless, Russian territory contains all the major vegetation zones of the world except a tropical rain forest.

==== Icecaps ====
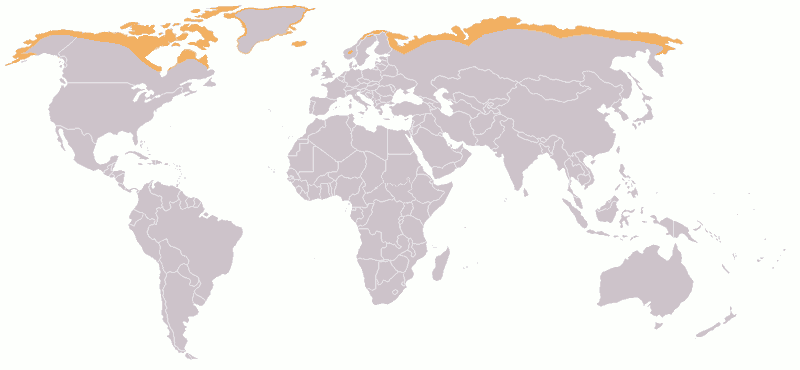
Map of arctic tundra.

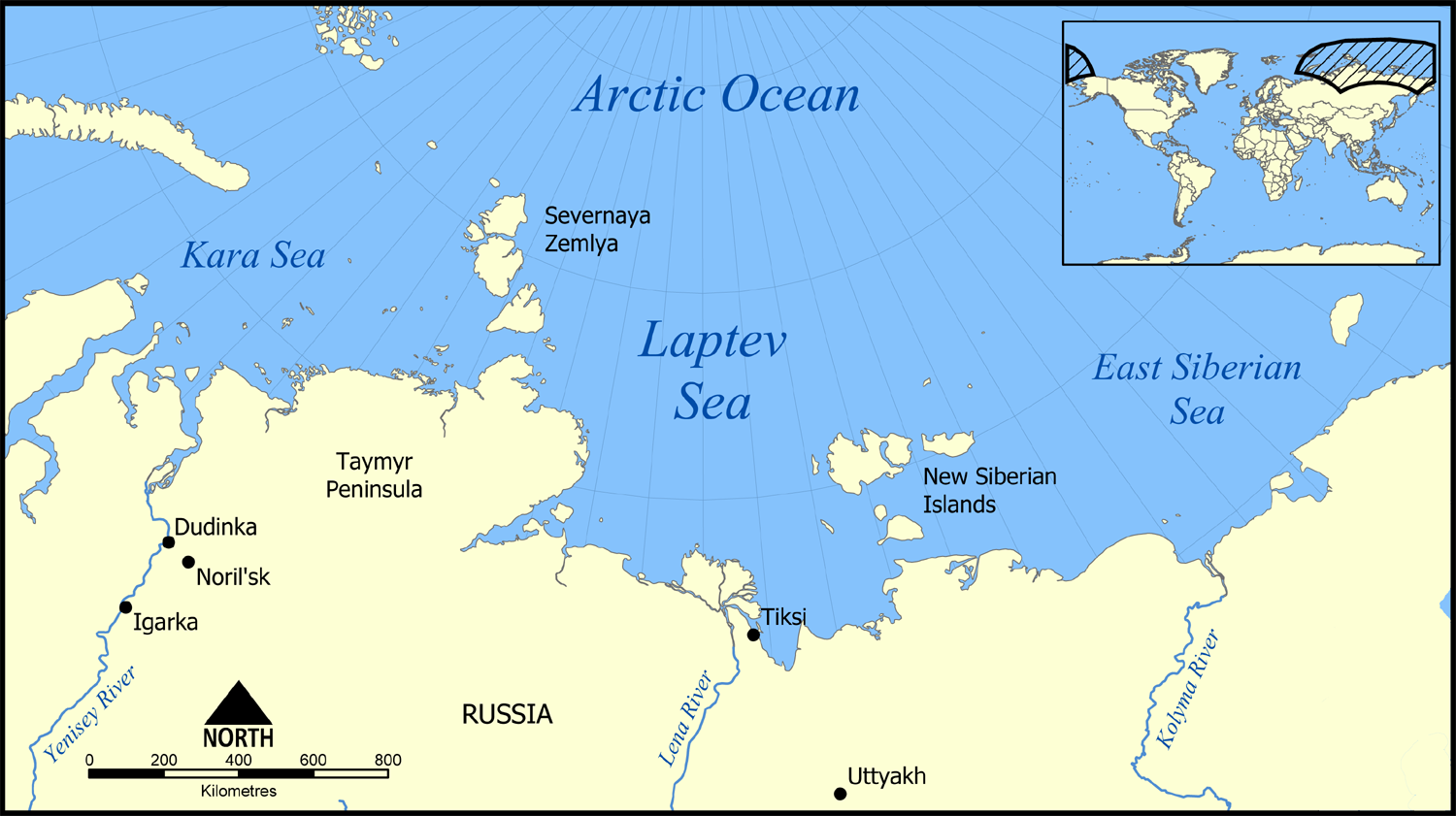
Map of the Russian Arctic.

The Russian Arctic stretches for close to 7,000 kilometres (4,300 mi) west to east, from Karelia and the Kola Peninsula to Nenetsia, the Gulf of Ob, the Taymyr Peninsula and the Chukchi Peninsula (Kolyma, Anadyr River, Cape Dezhnev). Russian islands and archipelagos in the Arctic Sea include Novaya Zemlya, Severnaya Zemlya, and the New Siberian Islands.

About 10 percent of Russia is tundra—a treeless, marshy plain. The tundra is Russia's northernmost zone, stretching from the Finnish border in the west to the Bering Strait in the east, then running south along the Pacific coast to the northern Kamchatka Peninsula. The zone is known for its herds of wild reindeer, for so-called white nights (dusk at midnight, dawn shortly thereafter) in summer, and for days of total darkness in winter. The long, harsh winters and lack of sunshine allow only mosses, lichens, and dwarf willows and shrubs to sprout low above the barren permafrost. Although several powerful Siberian rivers traverse this zone as they flow northward to the Arctic Ocean, partial and intermittent thawing hamper drainage of the numerous lakes, ponds, and swamps of the tundra. Frost weathering is the most important physical process here, gradually shaping a landscape that was severely modified by glaciation in the last ice age. Less than one percent of Russia's population lives in this zone. The fishing and port industries of the northwestern Kola Peninsula and the huge oil and gas fields of northwestern Siberia are the largest employers in the tundra. With a population of 180,000, the industrial frontier city of Norilsk is third in population to Murmansk and Arkhangelsk among Russia's settlements above the Arctic Circle. From here you can also see the auroras (northern lights).

==== Taiga ====
Taiga, the most extensive natural area of Russia, stretches from the western borders of Russia to the Pacific. It occupies the territory of the Eastern Europe and West Siberian plains to the north of ° N and most of the territory east of Yenisei River taiga forests reach the southern borders of Russia in Siberia taiga only accounts for over 60% of Russia. In the north–south direction the eastern taiga is divided (east of the Yenisei River), with a continental climate, and west, with a milder climate, in general, the climate zone is moist, moderately warm (cool in the north) in the summer and harsh winter, there is a steady snow cover in the winter. In the latitudinal direction, the taiga is divided into three subzones - northern, middle and southern taiga. In the western taiga dense spruce and fir forests on wetlands alternate with pine forests, shrubs, and meadows on the lighter soils. Such vegetation is typical of the eastern taiga, but it plays an important role not fir and larch. Coniferous forest, however, does not form a continuous array and sparse areas of birch, alder, willow (mainly in river valleys), the wetlands - marshes. Within the taiga are widespread fur-bearing animals - sable, marten, ermine, moose, brown bear, Wolverine, wolf, and muskrat.

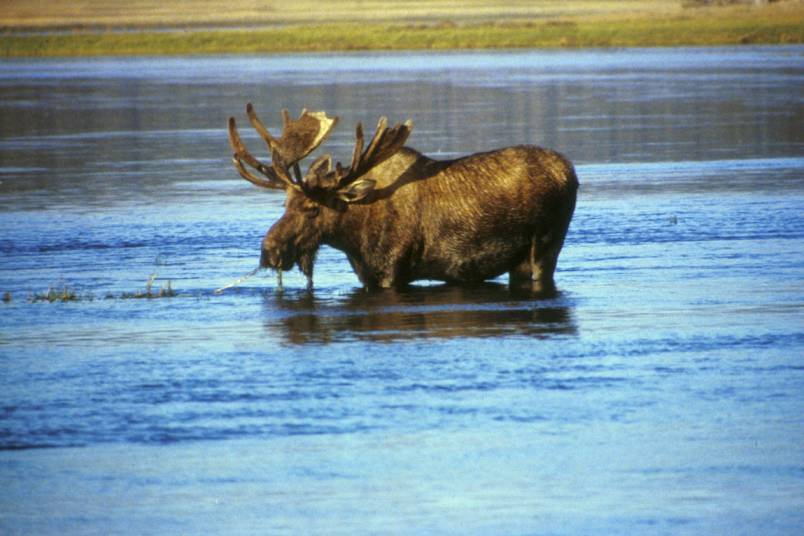
Moose

In the taiga is dominated by podzolic and cryogenic taiga soils, characterized by clearly defined horizontal structure (only in the southern taiga there is sod-podzolic soil). Formed in a leaching regime and in poor humus. Groundwater is normally found in the forest close to the surface, washing calcium from the upper layers, resulting in the top layer of soil of the taiga being discolored and oxidized. Few areas of the taiga, suitable for farming, are located mainly in the European part of Russia. Large areas are occupied by sphagnum marshes (here is dominated by podzolic-boggy soil). To enrich the soil for agricultural purposes lime and other fertilizers should be used.

Russian Taiga has the world's largest reserves of coniferous wood, but from year to year - as a result of intensive logging - they decrease. Development of hunting, farming (mainly in river valleys).

==== Mixed and deciduous forests ====
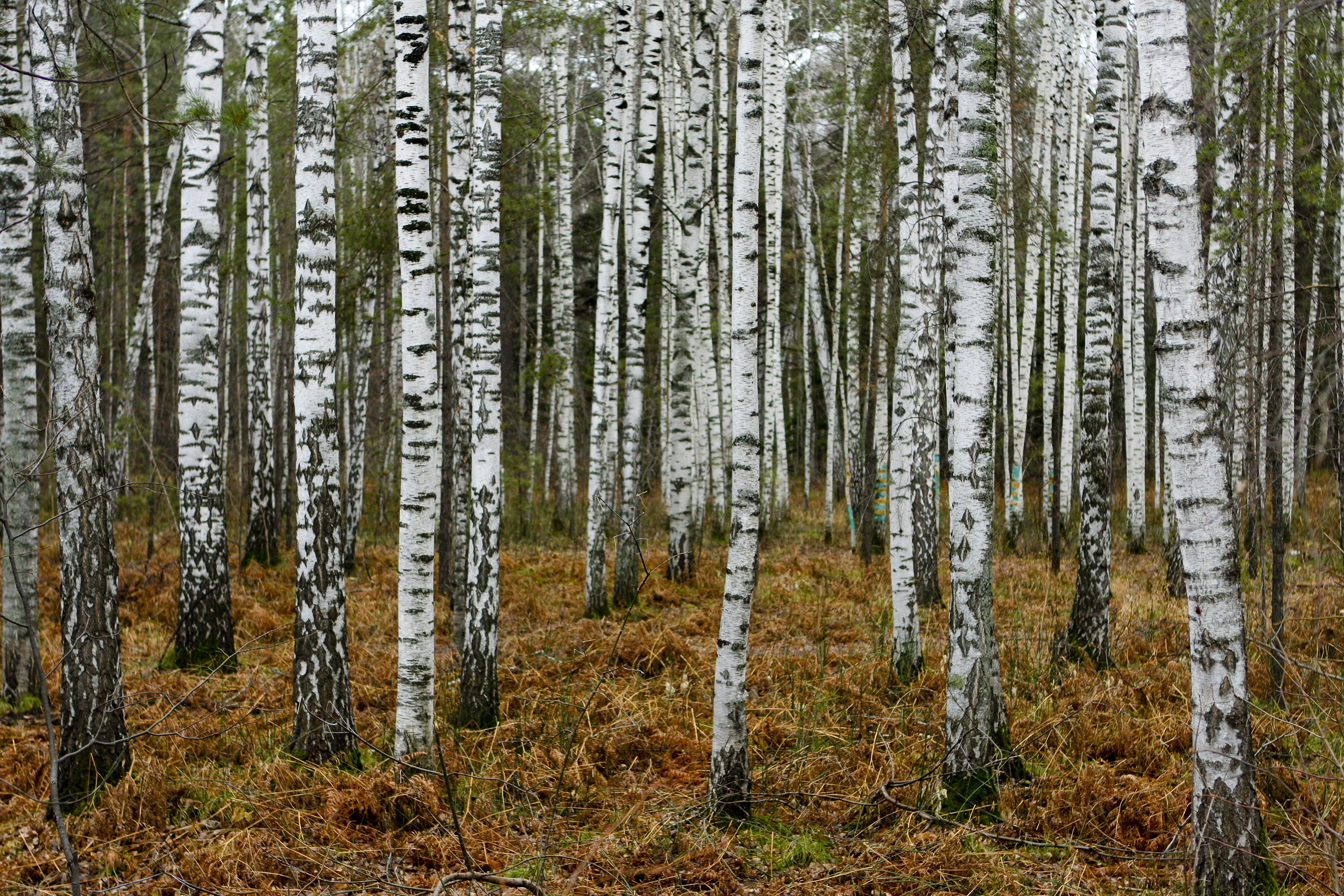
A birch forest in Novosibirsk. Birch is a national tree of Russia.

The mixed and deciduous forest belt is triangular, widest along the western border and narrower towards the Ural Mountains. The main trees are oak and spruce, but many other growths of vegetation such as ash, aspen, birch, hornbeam, maple, and pine reside there. Separating the taiga from the wooded steppe is a narrow belt of birch and aspen woodland located east of the Urals as far as the Altay Mountains. Much of the forested zone has been cleared for agriculture, especially in European Russia. Wildlife is more scarce as a result of this, but the roe deer, wolf, fox, and squirrel are very common.

==== Steppe ====
The steppe has long been depicted as the typical Russian landscape. It is a broad band of treeless, grassy plains, interrupted by mountain ranges, extending from Hungary across Ukraine, southern Russia, and Kazakhstan before ending in Manchuria. In a country of extremes, the steppe zone provides the most favorable conditions for human settlement and agriculture because of its moderate temperatures and normally adequate levels of sunshine and moisture. Even here, however, agricultural yields are sometimes adversely affected by unpredictable levels of precipitation and occasional catastrophic droughts. The soil is very dry.

=== Topography ===
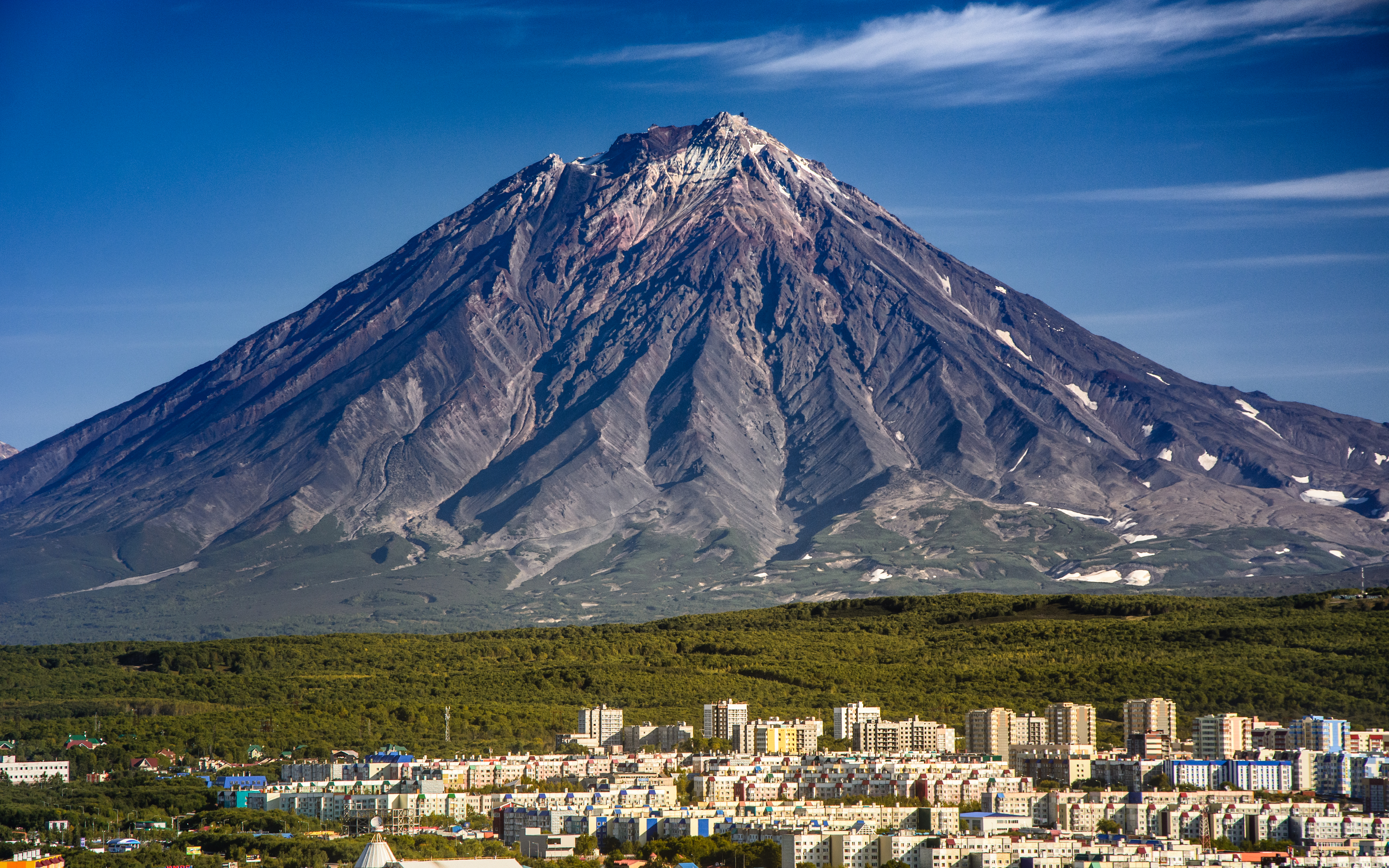
Koryaksky volcano towering over Petropavlovsk-Kamchatsky

Russia's mountain ranges are located principally along its continental dip (the Ural Mountains), along the southwestern border (the Caucasus), along the border with Mongolia (the eastern and western Sayan Mountains and the western extremity of the Altay Mountains), and in eastern Siberia (a complex system of ranges in the northeastern corner of the country and forming the spine of the Kamchatka Peninsula, and lesser mountains extending along the Sea of Okhotsk and the Sea of Japan). Russia has nine major mountain ranges. In general, the eastern half of the country is much more mountainous than the western half, the interior of which is dominated by low plains. The traditional dividing line between the east and the west is the Yenisei River valley. In delineating the western edge of the Central Siberian Plateau from the West Siberian Plain, the Yenisei runs from near the Mongolian border northward into the Arctic Ocean west of the Taymyr Peninsula.

==== Ural Mountains ====
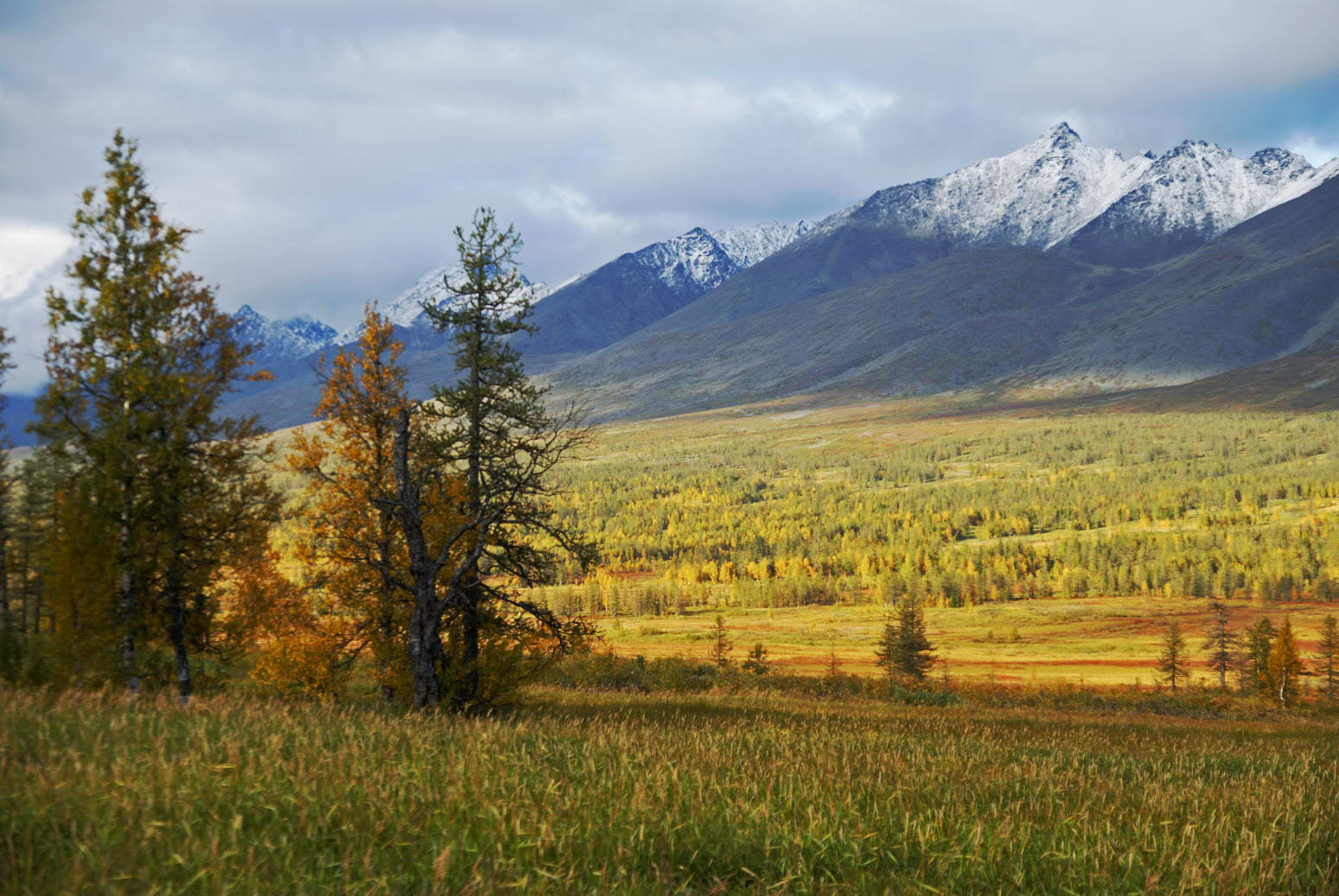
Yugyd Va National Park.

The Ural Mountains form the natural boundary between Europe and Asia; the range extends about 2,100 kilometres (1,300 mi) from the Arctic Ocean to the northern border of Kazakhstan. Several low passes provide major transportation routes through the Urals eastward from Europe. The highest peak, Mount Narodnaya, is 1,894 metres (6,214 ft). The Urals also contain valuable deposits of minerals.

==== West Siberian Plain ====
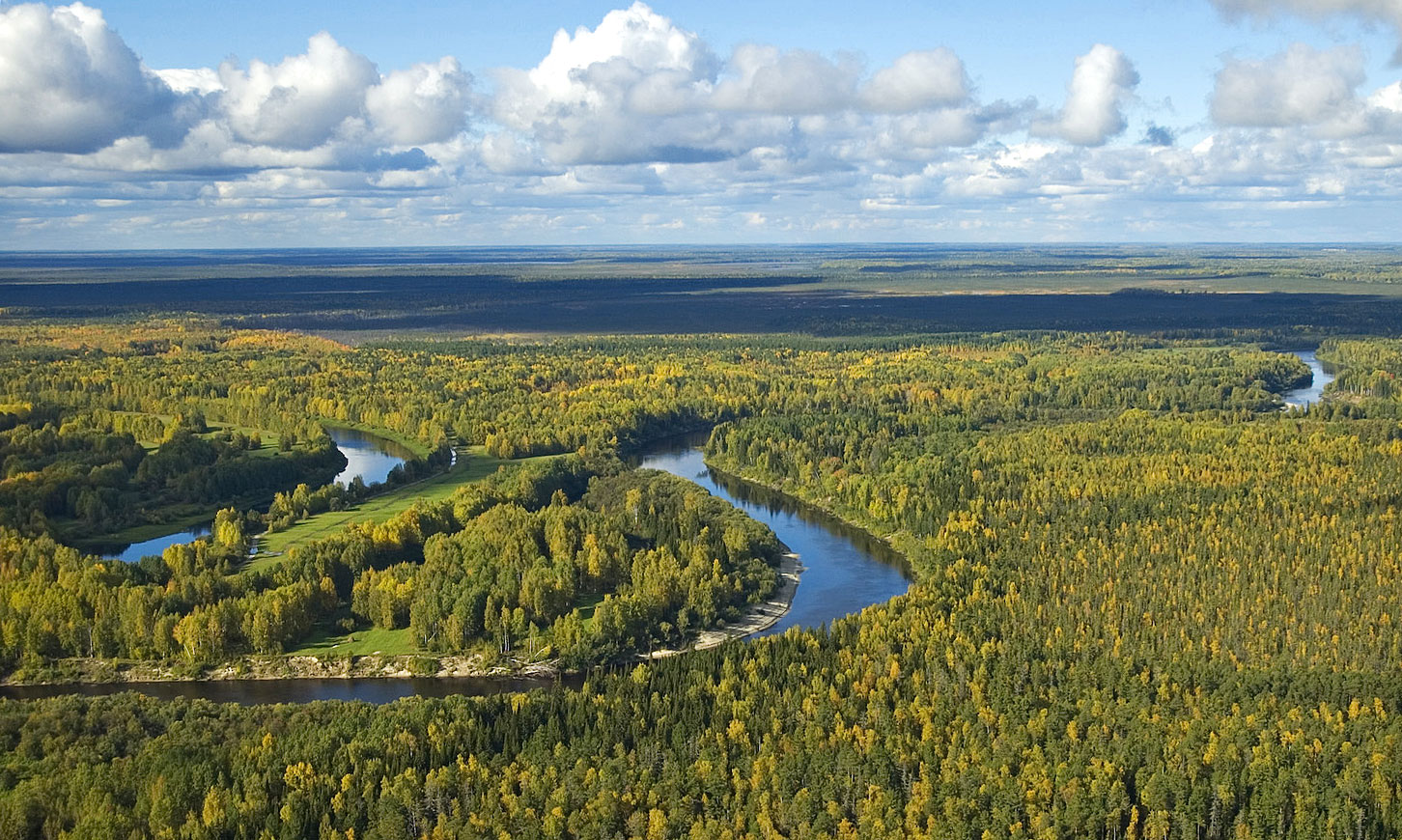
Vasyugan River

To the east of the Urals is the West Siberian Plain, stretching about 1,900 kilometres (1,200 mi) from west to east and about 2,400 kilometres (1,500 mi) from north to south. With more than half its territory below 200 metres (660 ft) in elevation, the plain contains some of the world's largest swamps and floodplains. The plain is largely flat and featureless. The only slightly elevated areas are the Siberian Uvaly across the central part and the Ob Plateau in the south. There are steppe areas in the southern part reaching into Kazakhstan, such as the Ishim Steppe with the Kamyshlov Log trench. Most of the plain's population lives in the drier section south of 77 degrees north latitude.

==== Central Siberian plateau ====
The region directly east of the West Siberian Plain is the Central Siberian Plateau, which extends eastward from the Yenisei River valley to the Lena River valley. The region is divided into several plateaus, with elevations ranging between 320 and 740 metres (1,050 and 2,430 ft); the highest elevation is about 1,800 metres (5,900 ft), in the northern Putorana Mountains. The plain is bounded on the south by the Primorsky Range and the Baikal Mountains, and on the north by the North Siberian Lowland, an extension of the West Siberian Plain extending into the Taymyr Peninsula on the Arctic Ocean.

==== Sayan and Stanovoy Mountains ====
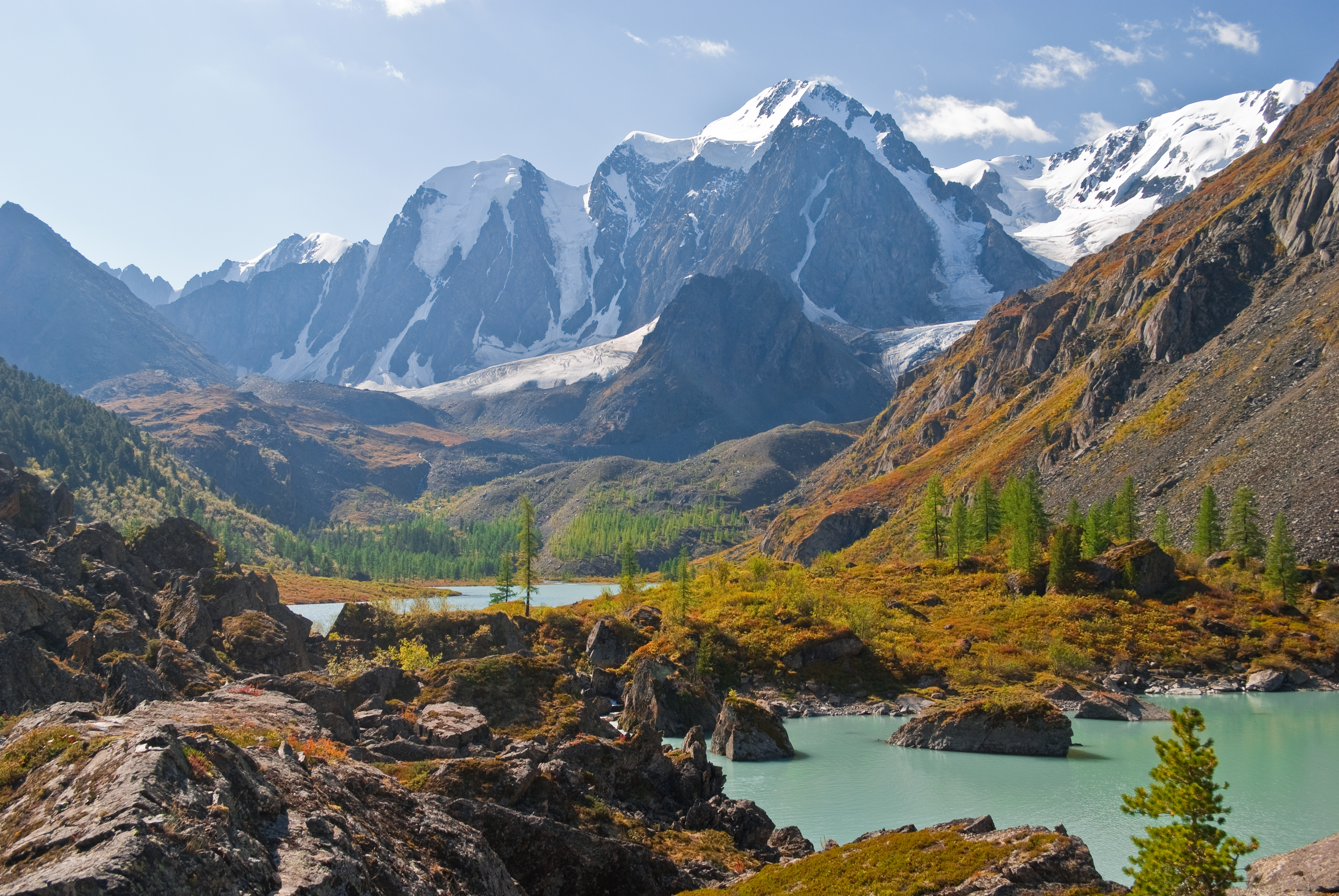
Altay Mountains

In the mountain system west of Lake Baikal in south-central Siberia, the highest elevations are 3,300 metres (10,800 ft) in the Western Sayan, 3,200 metres (10,500 ft) in the Eastern Sayan, and 4,500 metres (14,800 ft) at Belukha Mountain in the Altay Mountains. The Eastern Sayan reach nearly to the southern shore of Lake Baikal; at the lake, there is an elevation difference of more than 4,500 metres (14,800 ft) between the nearest mountain, 2,840 metres (9,320 ft) high, and the deepest part of the lake, which is 1,700 metres (5,600 ft) below sea level. The mountain systems east of Lake Baikal are lower, forming a complex of minor ranges and valleys that reaches from the lake to the Pacific coast. The maximum height of the Stanovoy Range, which runs west to east from northern Lake Baikal to the Sea of Okhotsk, is 2,550 metres (8,370 ft). To the south of that range is southeastern Siberia, whose mountains reach 800 metres (2,600 ft). Across the Strait of Tartary from that region is Sakhalin Island, Russia's largest island, where the highest elevation is about 1,700 metres (5,600 ft). The small Moneron Island, the site of the shootdown of Korean Air Lines Flight 007, is found to its west.

==== Caucasus Mountains ====
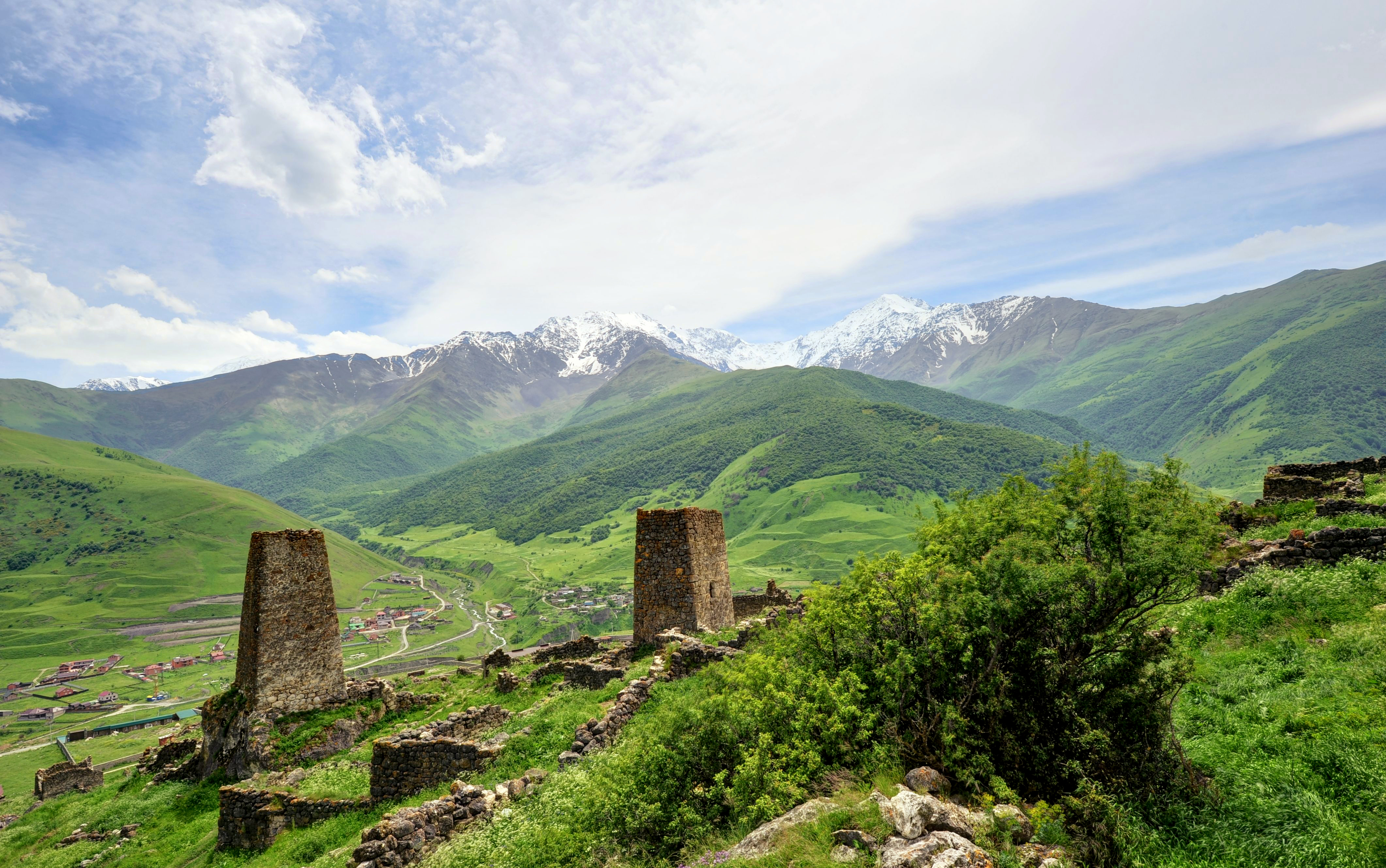
Caucasus Mountains

Truly alpine terrain appears in the southern mountain ranges. Between the Black and Caspian seas, the Caucasus Mountains rise to impressive heights, forming a boundary between Europe and Asia. One of the peaks, Mount Elbrus, is the highest point in Europe, at 5,642 metres (18,510 ft). The geological structure of the Caucasus extends to the northwest as the Crimean and Carpathian Mountains and southeastward into Central Asia as the Tian Shan and Pamirs. The Caucasus Mountains create an imposing natural barrier between Russia and its neighbors to the southwest, Georgia and Azerbaijan.

==== Northeast Siberia and Kamchatka ====
Northeastern Siberia, north of the Stanovoy Range, is an extremely mountainous region. The long Kamchatka Peninsula, which juts southward into the Sea of Okhotsk, includes many volcanic peaks, some of which are still active. The highest is the 4,750-metre (15,580 ft) Klyuchevskaya Sopka, the highest point in the Russian Far East. The volcanic chain continues from the southern tip of Kamchatka southward through the Kuril Islands chain and into Japan. Kamchatka also is one of Russia's two centers of seismic activity (the other is the Caucasus). In 1995, a major earthquake largely destroyed the oil-processing town of Neftegorsk. Also located in this region is the very large Beyenchime-Salaatin crater.

=== Drainage ===
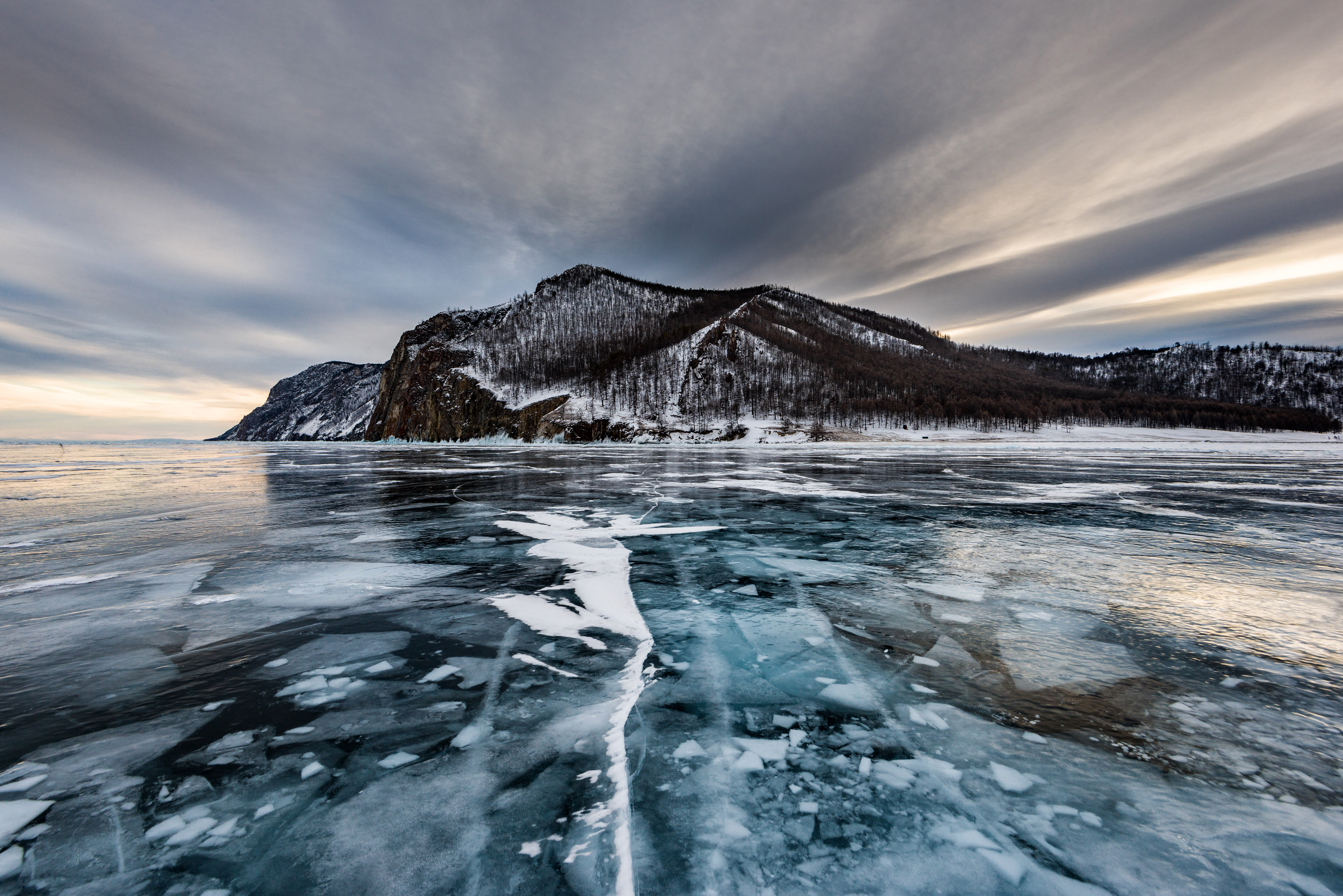
A frozen Lake Baikal, near Olkhon Island.

Russia, home to over 100,000 rivers, is divided into twenty watershed districts. It has one of the world's largest surface water resources, with its lakes containing approximately one-quarter of the world's liquid fresh water. Russia is second only to Brazil by total renewable water resources.

Forty of Russia's rivers longer than 1,000 kilometres (620 mi) are east of the Ural Mountains, including the three major rivers that drain Siberia as they flow northward to the Arctic Ocean: the Irtysh-Ob system (totaling 5,380 kilometres or 3,340 miles), the Yenisey (5,075 kilometres or 3,153 miles), and the Lena (4,294 kilometres or 2,668 miles), they are among the world's longest rivers. The basins of those river systems cover about eight million square kilometres (3.1 million square miles), discharging nearly 50,000 cubic meters of water per second (1.8 million cu ft/s) into the Arctic Ocean. The northward flow of these rivers means that source areas thaw before the areas downstream, creating vast swamps such as the 48,000-square-kilometre (19,000 sq mi) Vasyugan Swamp in the center of the West Siberian Plain. The same is true of other river systems, including the Pechora and the Northern Dvina in western Russia, and the Kolyma and the Indigirka in Siberia. Approximately 10 percent of Russian territory is classified as swampland.

Russia's inland bodies of water are chiefly a legacy of extensive glaciation. Ladoga and Onega in northwestern Russia are two of the largest lakes in Europe. However, Lake Baikal is the largest and most prominent among Russia's fresh water bodies, is the world's deepest, purest, oldest and most capacious fresh water lake, containing over one-fifth of the world's fresh surface water. Numerous smaller lakes dot northern Russia and Siberian plains. The largest of these are lakes Belozero, Topozero, Vygozero, and Ilmen in the country's northwest and Lake Chany in southwestern Siberia.

A number of other rivers drain Siberia from eastern mountain ranges into the Pacific Ocean. The Amur River and its main tributary, the Ussuri, form a long stretch of the winding boundary between Russia and China. The Amur system drains most of southeastern Siberia. Three basins drain European Russia. The Dnieper, which flows mainly through Belarus and Ukraine, has its headwaters in the hills west of Moscow. The 1,860-kilometre (1,160 mi) Don, which is the fifth-longest river in Europe, originates in the Central Russian Upland south of Moscow and then flows into the Sea of Azov at Rostov-on-Don. The Volga, widely seen as Russia's national river due to its historical and cultural importance, is the longest river in Europe, it rises in the Valdai Hills west of Moscow and meandering southeastward for 3,510 kilometres (2,180 mi) before emptying into the Caspian Sea. Altogether, the Volga system drains about 1.4 million square kilometres (540,000 mi^{2}). Linked by several canals, western Russia's rivers long have been a vital transportation system; the Volga remains the country's most commercial river, and carries about two-thirds of Russia's inland water traffic.

== Agriculture geography ==
One billion acres of land is arable in Russia, but only about 0.1 percent is permanent agriculture. The landscapes of region have extremely varied environments because of the following:

- Tundra landscapes cover most of the region, where conditions are harsh because of the cold climates, and plant life is not very well supported to grow because of the harsh conditions. This has become a problem, as the unfavorable conditions make agriculture more difficult.
- Mountain ranges are spread through the region, such as the Ural Mountains, which have become the dividing line between European Russia and Eurasian Russia.
- European Russia also has the European plains which extend about 3,200 kilometres (2,000 mi).

The workforce involved in agriculture workforce was reported to be about 9.4% of the population in 2016.

The main export of Russia is grain, which is about 6% of the world trade. Other exported products include fish and oil with 3%, meals with 2%, and meat which accounts for less than 1%.

=== Pre-industrial agriculture ===
Agriculture has always been important for Russia. The land was worked by its peasant class.

== Climate ==
Köppen climate classification of Russia.

Average temperatures in Russia

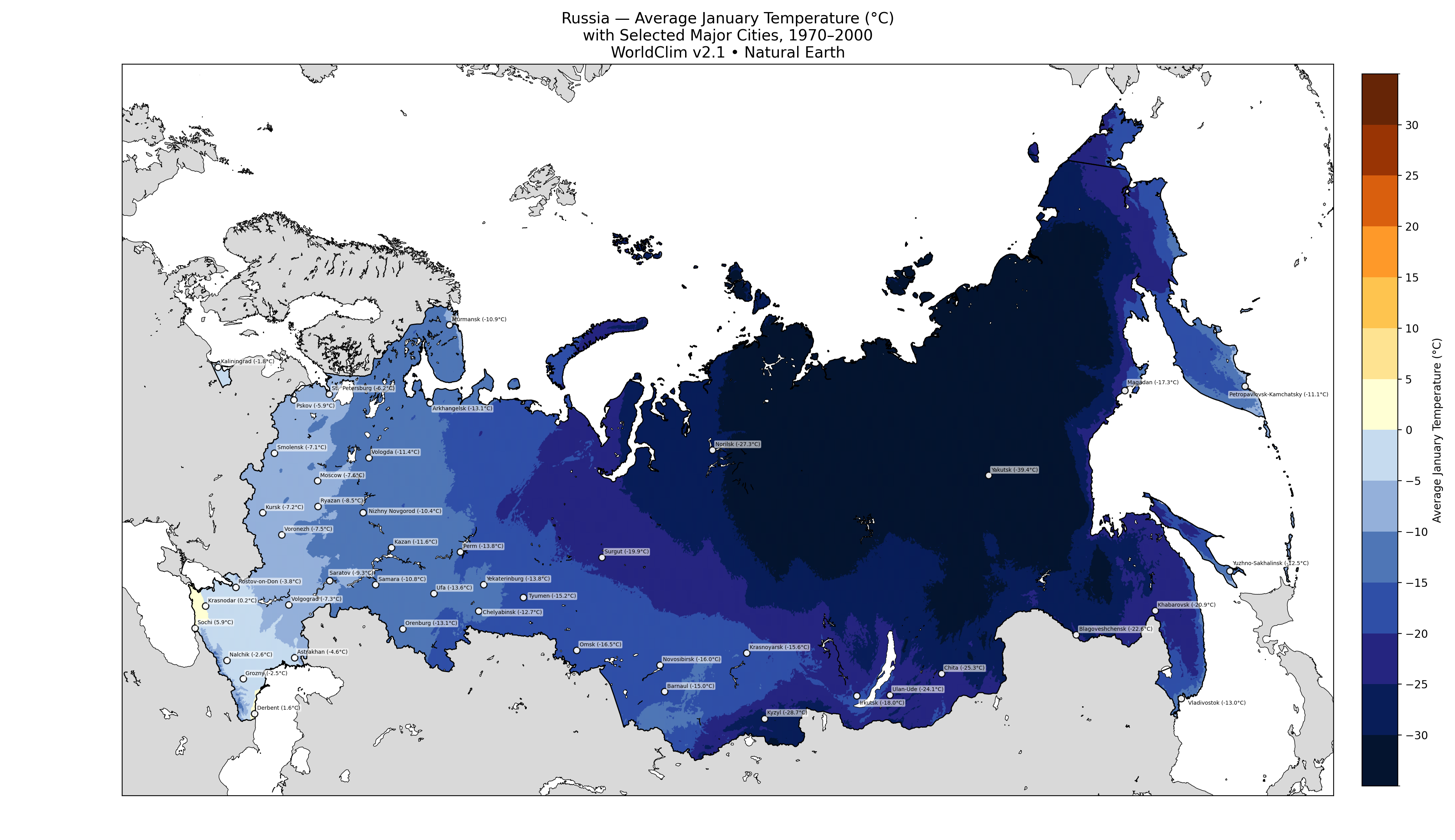
Map of Russia showing the average air temperature in January

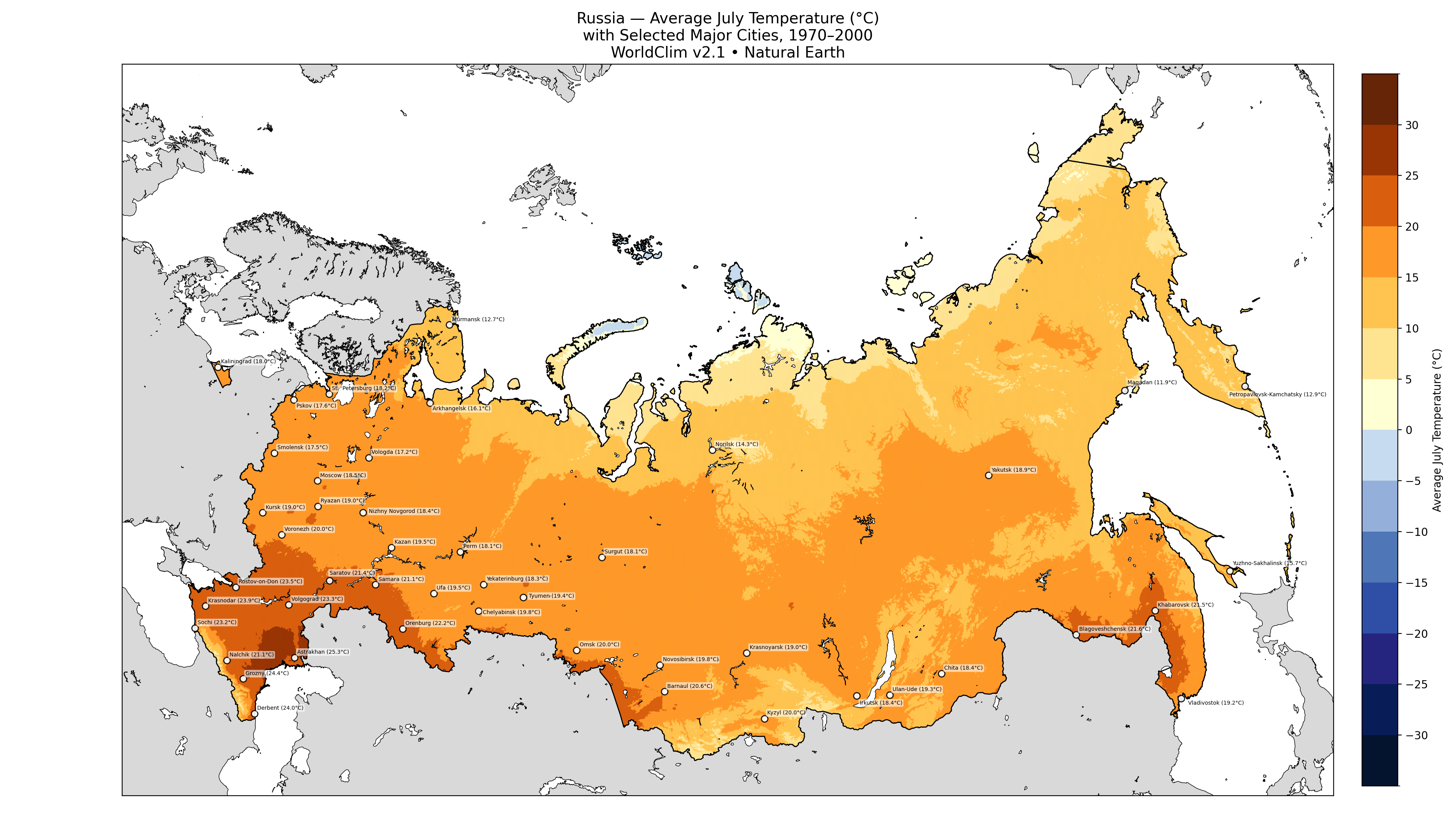
Map of Russia showing the average air temperature in July

The sheer size of Russia and the remoteness of many areas from the sea result in the dominance of the humid continental climate, which is prevalent in all parts of the country except for the tundra and the extreme southwest. Mountains in the south and east obstruct the flow of warm air masses from the Indian and Pacific oceans, while the plain of the west and north makes the country open to Arctic and Atlantic influences. Most of Northwest Russia and Siberia has a subarctic climate, with extremely severe winters in the inner regions of Northeast Siberia (mostly Sakha, where the Northern Pole of Cold is located with the record low temperature of −71.2 °C or −96.2 °F), and more moderate winters elsewhere. Russia's vast stretch of land along the Arctic Ocean and the Russian Arctic islands have a polar climate.

The coastal part of Krasnodar Krai on the Black Sea, most notably Sochi, and some coastal and interior strips of the North Caucasus possess a humid subtropical climate with mild and wet winters. In many regions of East Siberia and the Russian Far East, winter is dry compared to summer; while other parts of the country experience more even precipitation across seasons. Winter precipitation in most parts of the country usually falls as snow. The westernmost parts of Kaliningrad Oblast on the Vistula Spit, and some parts in the south of Krasnodar Krai and the North Caucasus have an oceanic climate. The region along the Lower Volga and Caspian Sea coast, as well as some southernmost silvers of Siberia, possess a semi-arid climate and an arid climate.

Throughout much of the territory, there are only two distinct seasons—winter and summer—as spring and autumn are usually brief periods of change between extremely low and extremely high temperatures. The coldest month is January (February on the coastline); the warmest is usually July. Great ranges of temperature are typical. In winter, temperatures get colder both from south to north and from west to east. Summers can be quite hot, even in Siberia.

== Area and boundaries ==
Area (excluding Crimea):

- Total: 17,098,242 km^{2} (6,601,668 sq mi)
- Land: 16,376,870 km^{2} (6,323,140 sq mi)
- Water: 721,380 km^{2} (278,530 sq mi)

Area - comparative:
Slightly larger than twice the size of Brazil

Land boundaries:

- Total (excluding Crimea): 19,917 km (12,376 mi)

Kaliningrad forms the westernmost part of Russia, having no land connection to the rest of the country. It is bounded by Poland, Lithuania, and the Baltic Sea.

Crimea, a peninsula on the Black Sea, is claimed and de facto administered by the Russian Federation since Russia occupied and annexed it from neighboring Ukraine in March 2014. It is recognized as a territory of Ukraine by most of the international community.

Border countries:

Table of countries with a land border with Russia (listed anti-clockwise around Russia).
Country	Length	
Country	km	mi
Norway	195.8	121.7
Finland	1,271.8	790.3
Estonia	138	86
Latvia	270.5	168.1
Lithuania	266	165
Poland	204.1	126.8
Belarus	1,239	770
Ukraine	1,925.8	1,196.6
Georgia	875.5	544.0
Azerbaijan	372.6	231.5
Kazakhstan	7,512.8	4,668.2
Mongolia	3,485	2,165
China	4,209.3	2,615.5
North Korea	17	11
Japan	water	
US	water	

If Abkhazia and South Ossetia are counted as sovereign states:
Country	Length	
Country	km	mi
Abkhazia	255.4	158.7
South Ossetia	70	43
remaining border with Georgia	365	227

Coastline excluding Crimea: 37,653 km (23,396 mi)

Maritime claims:

- Russian continental shelf: 200 m (660 ft) depth or to the depth of exploitation
- Exclusive economic zone: 7,566,673 km^{2} (2,921,509 mi^{2}) with 200 nmi (370.4 km; 230.2 mi)
- Territorial sea: 12 nmi (22.2 km; 13.8 mi)

Elevation extremes:

- Lowest point: Caspian Sea: −28 m (−92 ft)
- Highest point: Mount Elbrus: 5,642 m (18,510 ft)

== Natural resources and land use ==
Russia holds the greatest reserves of mineral resources of any country in the world. Though they are abundant, they are in remote areas with extreme climates, making them expensive to mine. The country is the most abundant in mineral fuels. It may hold as much as half of the world's coal reserves and even larger reserves of petroleum. Deposits of coal are scattered throughout the region, but the largest are located in central and eastern Siberia. The most developed fields lie in western Siberia, in the northeastern European region, in the area around Moscow, and in the Urals. The major petroleum deposits are located in western Siberia and in the Volga-Urals. Smaller deposits are found throughout the country. Natural gas, a resource of which Russia holds around forty percent of the world's reserves, can be found along Siberia's Arctic coast, in the North Caucasus, and in northwestern Russia. Major iron-ore deposits are located south of Moscow, near the Ukrainian border in the Kursk Magnetic Anomaly; this area contains vast deposits of iron ore that have caused a deviation in the Earth's magnetic field. There are smaller deposits in other parts of the country. The Ural mountains hold small deposits of manganese. nickel, tungsten, cobalt, molybdenum and other iron alloying elements occur in adequate quantities.

Russia also contains most of the nonferrous metals. Aluminium ores are scarce and are found primarily in the Ural region, northwestern European Russia, and south-central Siberia. Copper is more abundant and major reserves are located in the Urals, the Norilsk area near the mouth of the Yenisey in eastern Siberia, and the Kola Peninsula. Another vast deposit located east of Lake Baikal only became exploited when the Baikal-Amur Mainline (BAM) railroad was finished in 1989.

The North Caucasus, far eastern Russia, and the western edge of the Kuznetsk Basin in southern Siberia contain an abundance of lead and zinc ores. These are commonly found along with copper, gold, silver, and a large amount of other rare metals. The country has one of the largest gold reserves in the world; mostly in Siberia and the Urals. Mercury deposits can be found in the central and southern Urals and in south-central Siberia.

Raw materials are abundant as well, including potassium and magnesium salt deposits in the Kama River region of the western Urals. Russia also contains one of the world's largest deposits of apatite found in the central Kola Peninsula. Rock salt is located in the southwestern Urals and the southwest of Lake Baikal. Surface deposits of salt are found in salt lakes along the lower Volga Valley. Sulfur can be found in the Urals and the middle Volga Valley.

Eight percent of the land is used for arable farming, four percent—for permanent pastures, forty-six percent of the land is forests and woodland, and forty-two percent is used for other purposes.

A recent global remote sensing analysis suggested that there were 1,002 km^{2} (387 sq mi) of tidal flats in Russia, making it the 33rd ranked country in terms of tidal flat area.

== Natural hazards ==
Volcanic activity in the Kuril Islands and volcanoes and earthquakes on the Kamchatka Peninsula are other natural hazards.

== See also ==
- Geography of the Soviet Union
- Geology of Russia
- History of Russia
- List of Russian explorers
- Territorial evolution of Russia
