= Esil District, North Kazakhstan Region =

Coordinates: 54°21′N 68°27′E

Esil District
- District
- Есіл ауданы
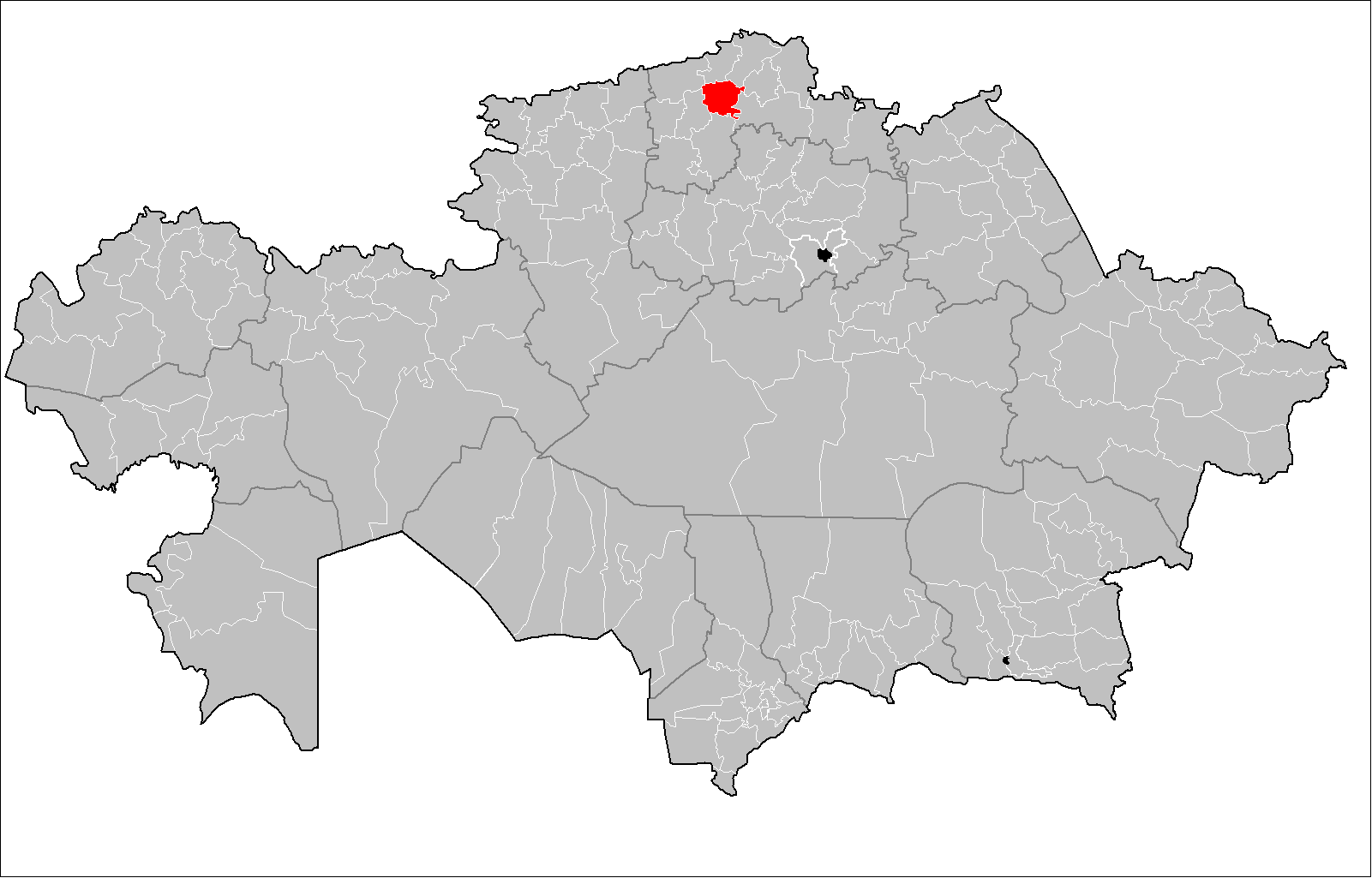
- Country: Kazakhstan
- Region: North Kazakhstan Region
- Administrative center: Yavlenka

Government
  - Akim: Mereke Mukhamedyarov

Population (2013)
  - Total: 26,615
- Time zone: UTC+6 (East)

Esil District (Kazakh: Есіл ауданы, Esıl audany) is a district of North Kazakhstan Region in northern Kazakhstan. The administrative center of the district is Yavlenka. Population: 26,615 (2013 estimate); 28,552 (2009 census results); 38,236 (1999 census results).

== Geography ==
Lakes Ulken Torangyl and Alua are located in the district.
