= Ulken Torangyl =

Lake in Kazakhstan

- Үлкен Тораңғыл
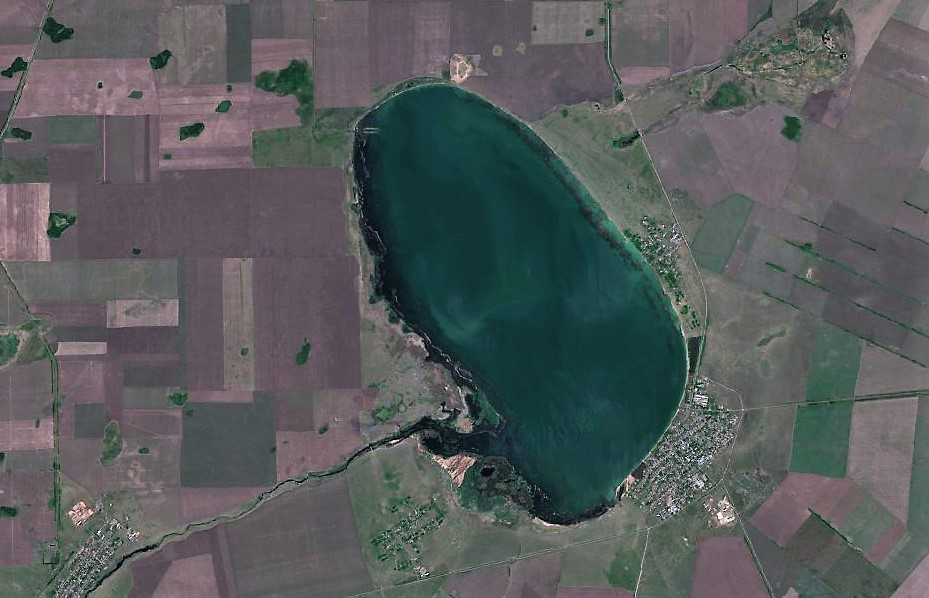
- Sentinel-2 image of the lake

- Location within Kazakhstan
- Location: Ishim Plain
- Coordinates: 54°02′10″N 68°21′59″E
- Type: endorheic
- Primary inflows: Kamysakty
- Primary outflows: none
- Catchment area: 2,000 square kilometers (770 sq mi)
- Basin countries: Kazakhstan
- Max. length: 10.3 kilometers (6.4 mi)
- Max. width: 5 kilometers (3.1 mi)
- Surface area: 42.2 square kilometers (16.3 sq mi)
- Average depth: 5 meters (16 ft)
- Max. depth: 6 meters (20 ft)
- Water volume: 0.95 cubic kilometers (0.23 cu mi)
- Residence time: UTC+6
- Shore length^{1}: 29.6 kilometers (18.4 mi)
- Surface elevation: 147 m (482 ft)
- Islands: none
- Settlements: Korneyevka and Sovietskoye
- ^{1} Shore length is not a well-defined measure.

Ulken Torangyl (Kazakh: Үлкен Тораңғыл; Russian: Большой Тарангул) is a lake in Esil District, North Kazakhstan Region, Kazakhstan.

The lake is located 30 kilometers (19 mi) to the SSW of Yavlenka town, the administrative center of the district. Korneyevka lies near the eastern lakeshore.

== Geography ==
Ulken Torangyl is an endorheic lake belonging to the Ishim River basin. It is located at the southern edge of the Ishim Plain. The shores are sandy. The 106-kilometer (66 mi) long Kamysakty river flows from the south into the southwestern shore of the lake. The Kamysakty and lake Ulken Torangyl form the upper section of the Kamyshlov Log from which the ancient valley of the Kamyshlov can be traced by a residual chain of lakes for almost 500 kilometers (310 mi) all the way to the Irtysh.

The lake is surrounded by agricultural fields. Lake Shaglyteniz lies 87 kilometers (54 mi) to the east and the Sergeyev Dam 60 kilometers (37 mi) to the WSW.

== Flora and fauna ==
Large swathes of the lakeshore are covered with reeds. There are 21 kinds of fish in the waters of the lake, including introduced species.

== See also ==
- Kamyshlov Log
- List of lakes of Kazakhstan
