= Magzhan Zhumabayev District =

Coordinates: 54°54′54″N 70°27′00″E

Magzhan Zhumabayev
- District
- Мағжан Жұмабаев ауданы
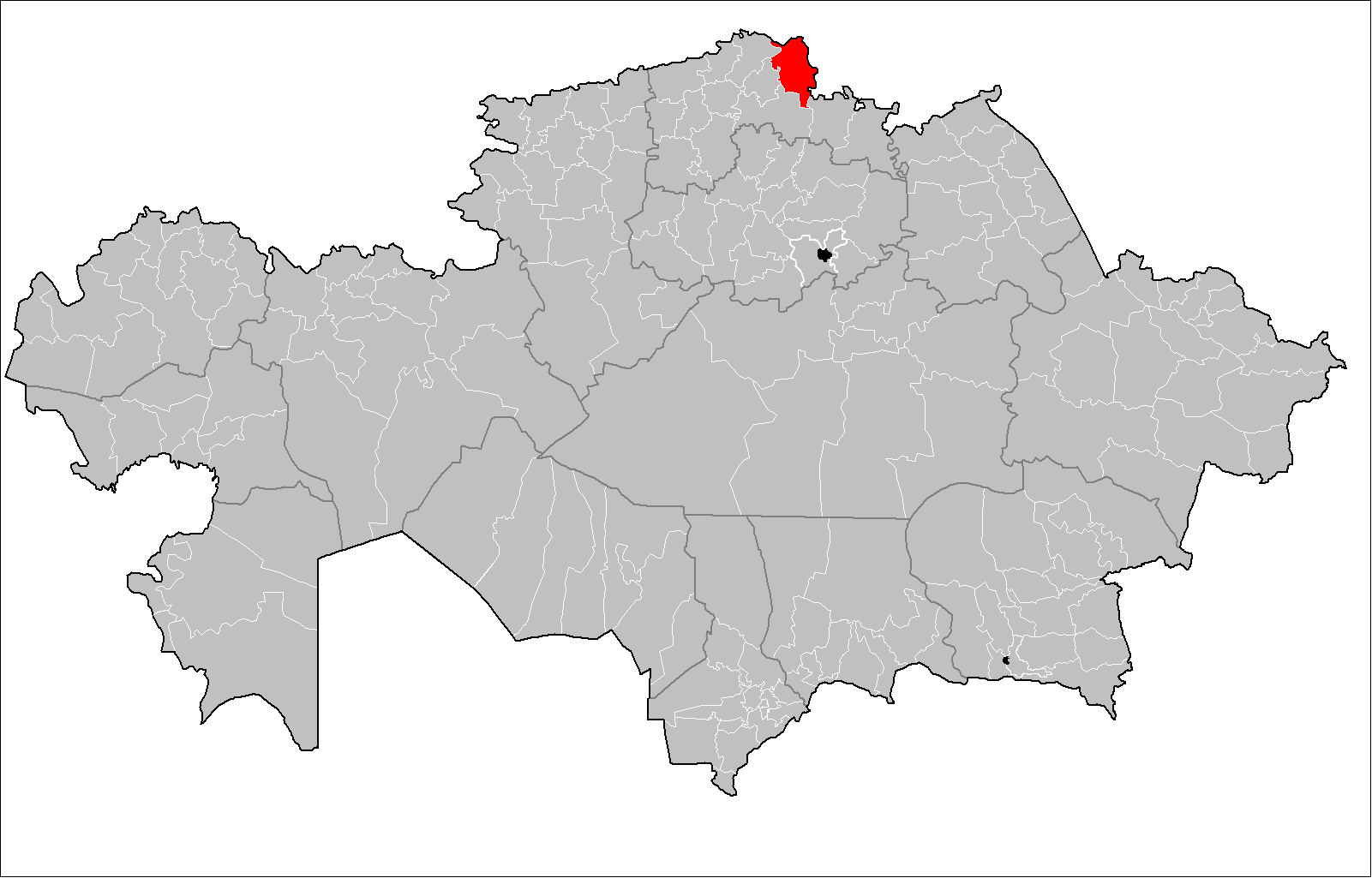
- Country: Kazakhstan
- Region: North Kazakhstan Region
- Administrative center: Bulayevo

Government
  - Akim: Rakhat Smagulov

Population (2013)
  - Total: 34,055
- Time zone: UTC+6 (East)

Magzhan Zhumabayev (Kazakh: Мағжан Жұмабаев ауданы, Mağjan Jūmabaev audany) is a district of North Kazakhstan Region in northern Kazakhstan. The administrative center of the district is the town of Bulayevo. Population: 34,055 (2013 estimate); 36,924 (2009 census results); 49,679 (1999 census results).

The district was renamed in 2000 after Kazakh writer and poet Magzhan Zhumabayev. Formerly it was known as Bulayevsky District.

== Geography ==
Part of swampy lake Shelegino lies close to the Kazakhstan–Russia border in the northeastern limit of the district.
