= Bulayevo =

- village
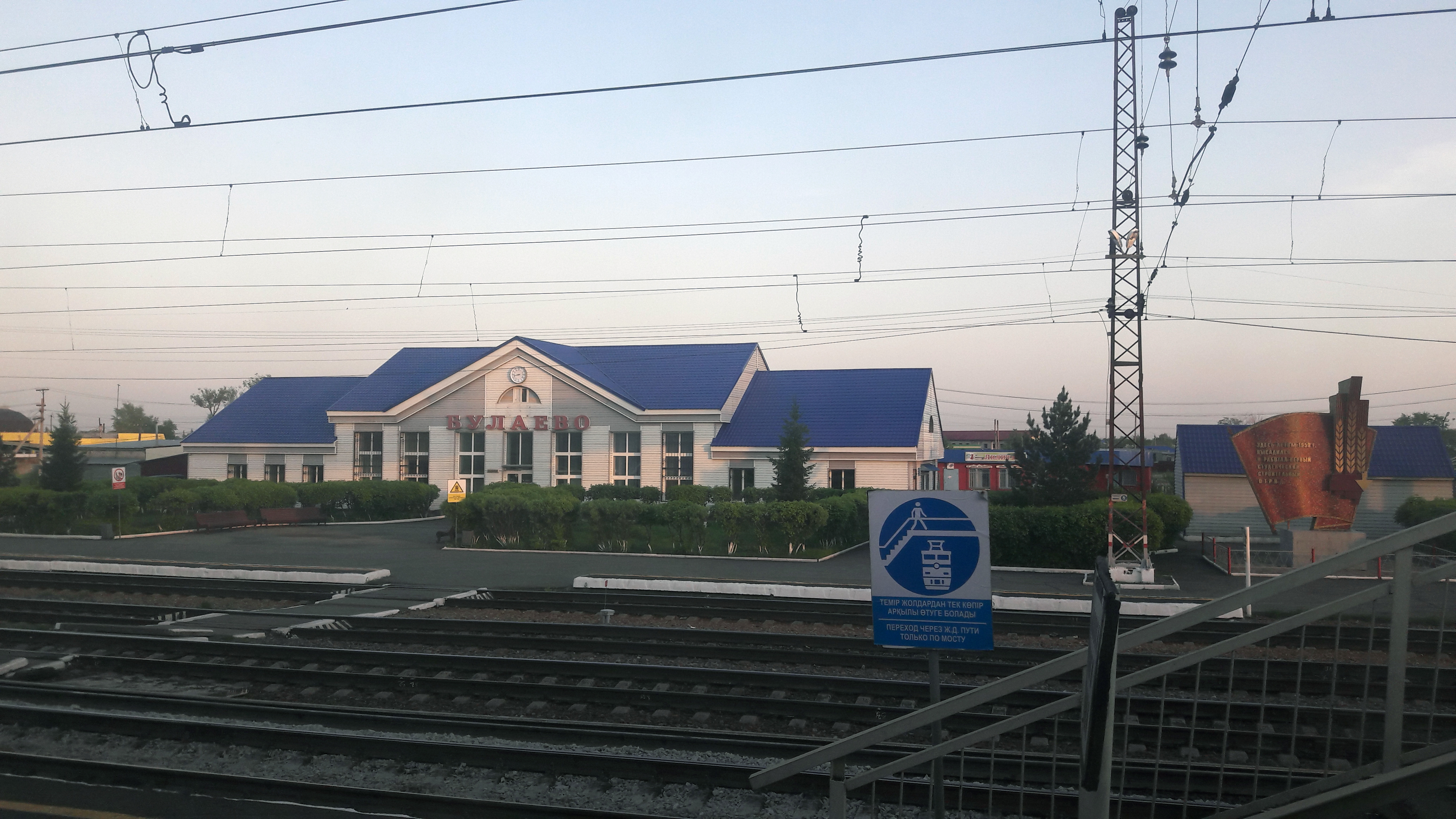
- Bulayevo station

- Location within Kazakhstan
- Coordinates: 54.9056°N 70.4439°E
- Country: Kazakhstan
- Region: North Kazakhstan Region
- District: Magzhan Zhumabayev District

Population (2009)
  - Total: 8,433
- Time zone: UTC+6 (East)

Bulayevo (Kazakh: Булаев, Bulaev) is a town and the administrative center of Magzhan Zhumabayev District in North Kazakhstan Region of Kazakhstan. Population: 8,433 (2009 census results);9,638 (1999 census results).

== Climate ==
Climate data for Bulayevo (1991–2020)
Month	Jan	Feb	Mar	Apr	May	Jun	Jul	Aug	Sep	Oct	Nov	Dec	Year
Mean daily maximum °C (°F)	−12.4 (9.7)	−10 (14)	−1.9 (28.6)	10.3 (50.5)	20.1 (68.2)	24.5 (76.1)	25.3 (77.5)	23.3 (73.9)	17 (63)	8.7 (47.7)	−3.1 (26.4)	−9.7 (14.5)	7.7 (45.9)
Daily mean °C (°F)	−16.6 (2.1)	−14.7 (5.5)	−6.9 (19.6)	4.5 (40.1)	13.0 (55.4)	18.0 (64.4)	19.2 (66.6)	17.0 (62.6)	10.7 (51.3)	3.7 (38.7)	−6.8 (19.8)	−13.7 (7.3)	2.3 (36.1)
Mean daily minimum °C (°F)	−20.4 (−4.7)	−18.9 (−2.0)	−11.2 (11.8)	−0.2 (31.6)	6.6 (43.9)	12.0 (53.6)	13.8 (56.8)	11.7 (53.1)	5.8 (42.4)	−0.1 (31.8)	−10.1 (13.8)	−17.5 (0.5)	−2.4 (27.7)
Average precipitation mm (inches)	17.5 (0.69)	15.8 (0.62)	18.6 (0.73)	25.2 (0.99)	31.0 (1.22)	46.1 (1.81)	73.5 (2.89)	53.9 (2.12)	30.6 (1.20)	31.7 (1.25)	29.6 (1.17)	23.7 (0.93)	397.2 (15.64)
Average precipitation days (≥ 1.0 mm)	6.0	5.1	4.9	5.5	6.5	7.6	9.3	7.6	6.5	7.3	8.3	6.9	81.5
Source: NOAA
