= Siverga =

Lake in Kazakhstan and Russia

- Сиверга
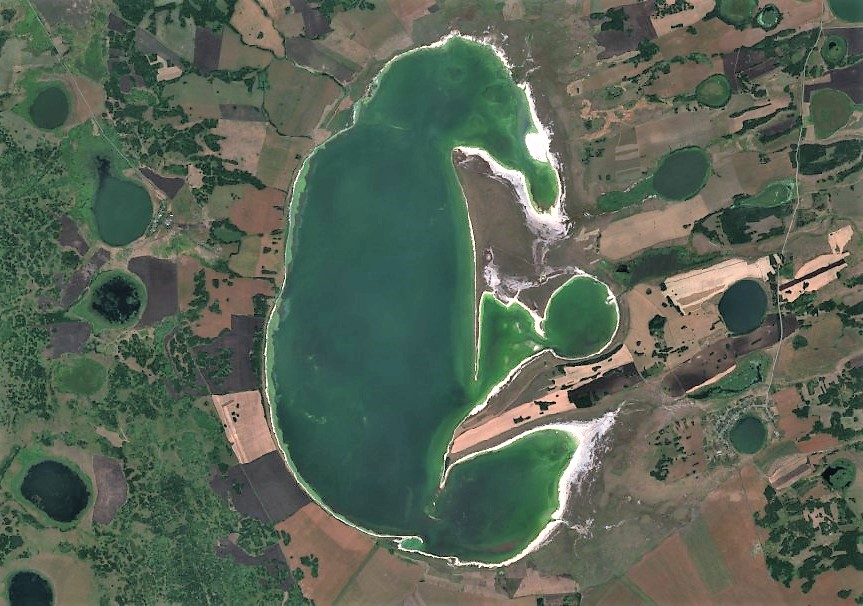
- Sentinel-2 image of the lake

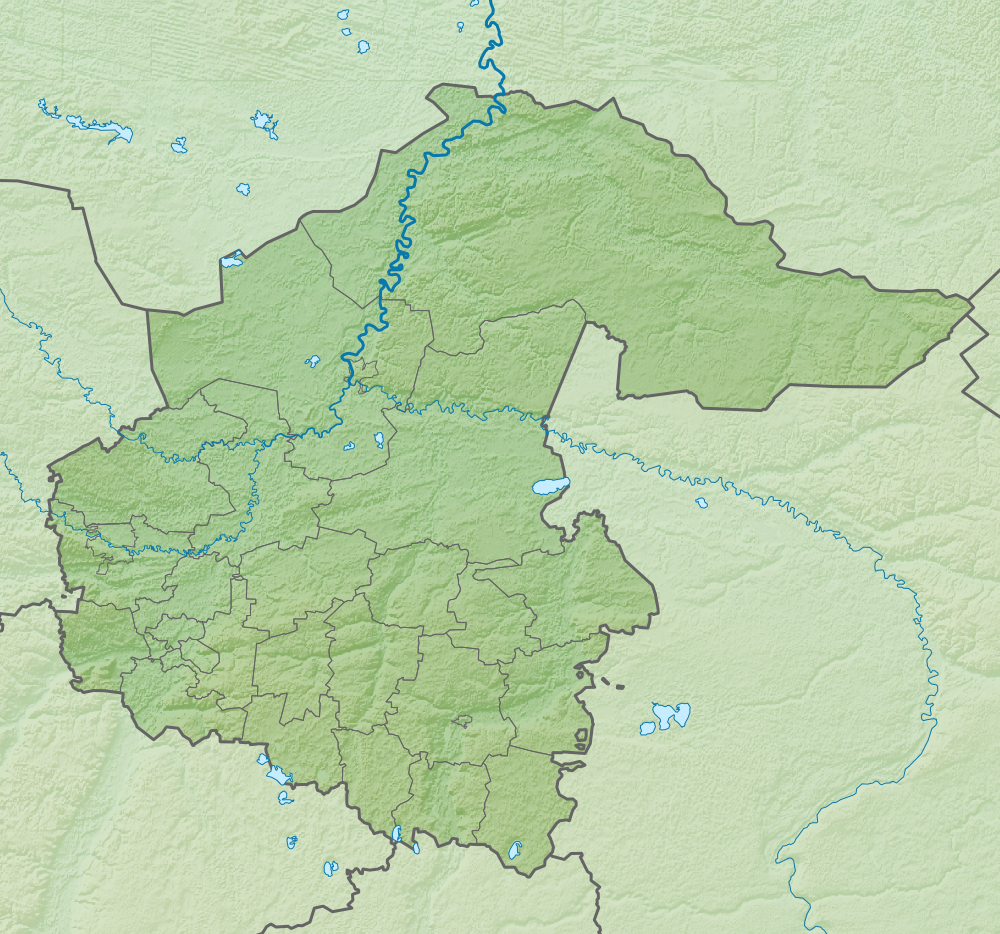
- Location within Tyumen Oblast Location within Kazakhstan
- Location: Ishim Plain; West Siberian Plain
- Coordinates: 55°24′21″N 68°43′44″E
- Type: endorheic
- Basin countries: Russian Federation & Kazakhstan
- Max. length: 12 kilometers (7.5 mi)
- Max. width: 5 kilometers (3.1 mi)
- Surface area: 53 square kilometers (20 sq mi)
- Residence time: UTC+6
- Shore length^{1}: 53 kilometers (33 mi)
- Surface elevation: 118 meters (387 ft)
- ^{1} Shore length is not a well-defined measure.

Siverga (Kazakh: Сиверга; Russian: Сиверга , is a salt lake in Kyzylzhar District, North Kazakhstan Region, Kazakhstan and Berdyuzhye and Kazan districts of Tyumen Oblast, Russian Federation.

The lake is located 45 kilometers (28 mi) to the southeast of Berdyuzhye and 32 kilometers (20 mi) to the southwest of Kazanskoye, the district capitals in Russia, and 43 kilometers (27 mi) to the NNW of Petropavl city, the regional capital in Kazakhstan. Polovinnoye village lies 1.5 kilometers (0.93 mi) to the west of the western shore and Novoalexandrovka 1 kilometer (0.62 mi) to the southeast of the eastern shore. Siverga is located at the Kazakhstan–Russia border, with most of the lake in Russia and only a small sector of the southern end in Kazakhstan.

== Geography ==
Siverga is an endorheic lake belonging to the Ishim River basin. It is located in an area dotted with small lakes at the southern edge of the Ishim Plain, part of the West Siberian Plain. The lake has an elongated capital letter "E" shape, stretching from north to south for almost 12 kilometers (7.5 mi). It has two bays opening to the northeastern and southeastern ends respectively. There is also a bay in the center of the eastern shore with an attached small circular lake.

Lake Akush is located 8 kilometers (5.0 mi) to the southeast, also on the border, and Tavolzhan 60 kilometers (37 mi) to the east. Lake Stanovoye lies in Kazakhstan, 67 kilometers (42 mi) to the SSW and Medvezhye in Russia, 43 kilometers (27 mi) to the WSW.

== Fauna ==
The lake is a 7,500 hectares (19,000 acres) important bird area, providing a habitat for a number of migratory bird species, including the nesting of the pallid harrier and the northern pintail. The Dalmatian pelican has also been reported at the lake. In the Russian Federation Siverga is also an officially protected area.

== See also ==
- List of lakes of Russia
