= Filatovo (lake) =

Lake in Russia

- Филатово
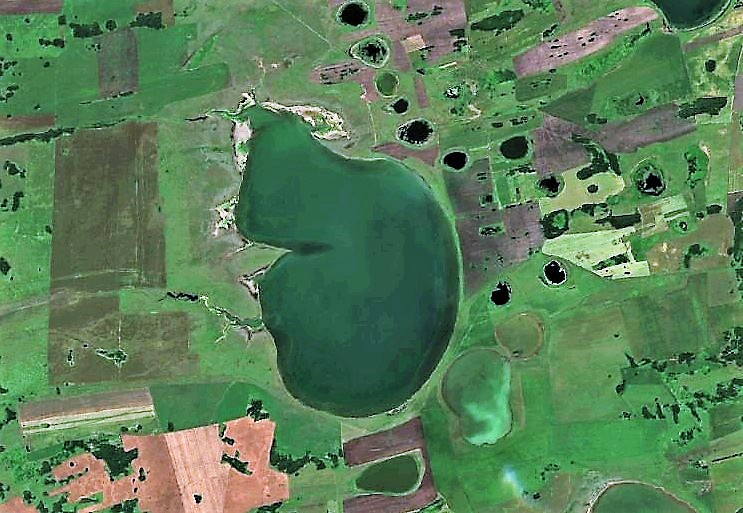
- Sentinel-2 picture of the lake

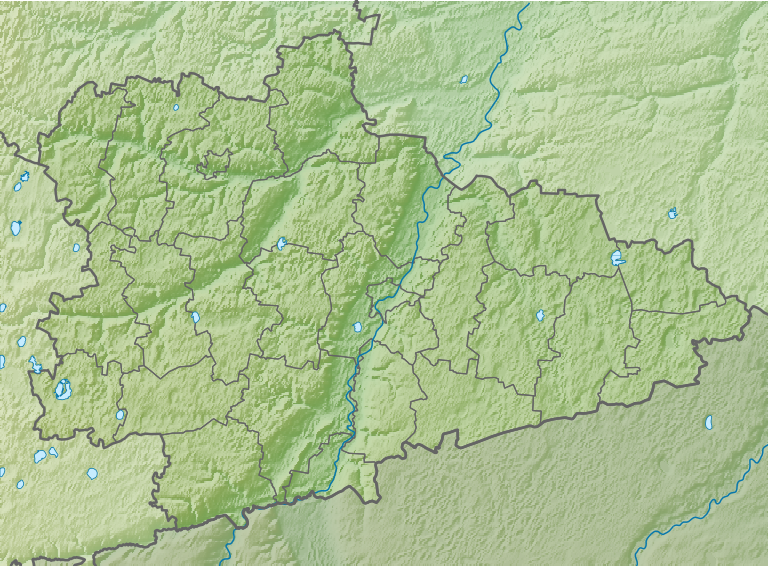
- Location within Kurgan Oblast Location within Russia
- Location: Ishim Plain
- Coordinates: 54°48′06″N 67°02′18″E
- Type: endorheic
- Basin countries: Russia
- Max. length: 7.6 kilometers (4.7 mi)
- Max. width: 4.5 kilometers (2.8 mi)
- Surface area: 22.5 square kilometers (8.7 sq mi)
- Residence time: UTC+5
- Surface elevation: 124 meters (407 ft)
- Islands: no

Filatovo (Russian: Филатово) is a body of water in Makushinsky District, Kurgan Oblast, Russia. It is the largest lake in the district.

The lake is located 46 kilometers (29 mi) to the south of Makushino and 57 kilometers (35 mi) to the southwest of Petukhovo. Presnovka, the capital of Zhambyl District, North Kazakhstan Region, lies 12 kilometers (7.5 mi) to the south, in Kazakhstan.

== Geography ==
Filatovo is a salt lake of the Ishim Plain, the southern part of the West Siberian Plain. The lake is roughly drop-shaped and the western shore has a landspit projecting eastwards. The Kazakhstan–Russia border fringes the southern end of the lake.

The area where Filatovo is located is dotted with smaller lakes. Larger lake Medvezhye lies 67 kilometers (42 mi) to the northeast and lake Menkeser 60 kilometers (37 mi) to the southeast, beyond the Kazakhstan-Russia border.

== Flora and fauna ==
Filatovo is surrounded by steppe vegetation. The main aquatic fauna of the lake is the small crustacean Artemia salina.

== See also ==
- List of lakes of Russia
