= Akush =

Lake in Kazakhstan and Russia

- Акуш / Ақыш
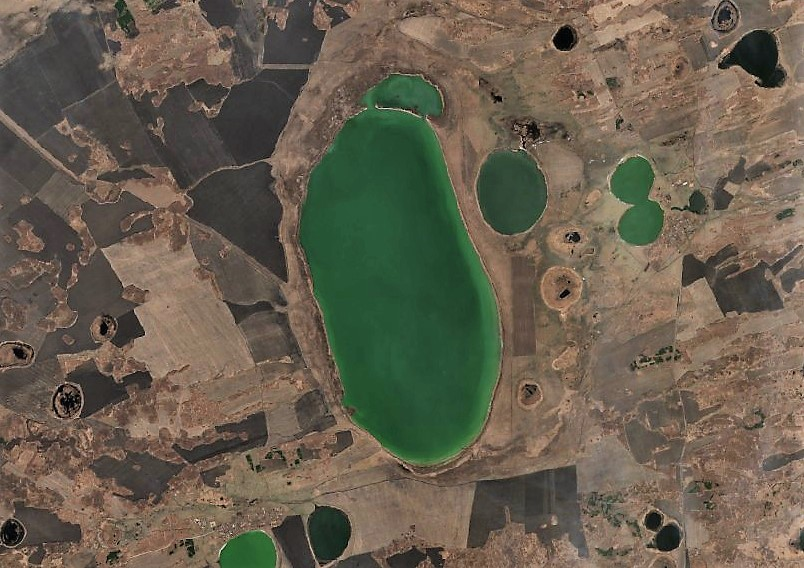
- Sentinel-2 image of the lake

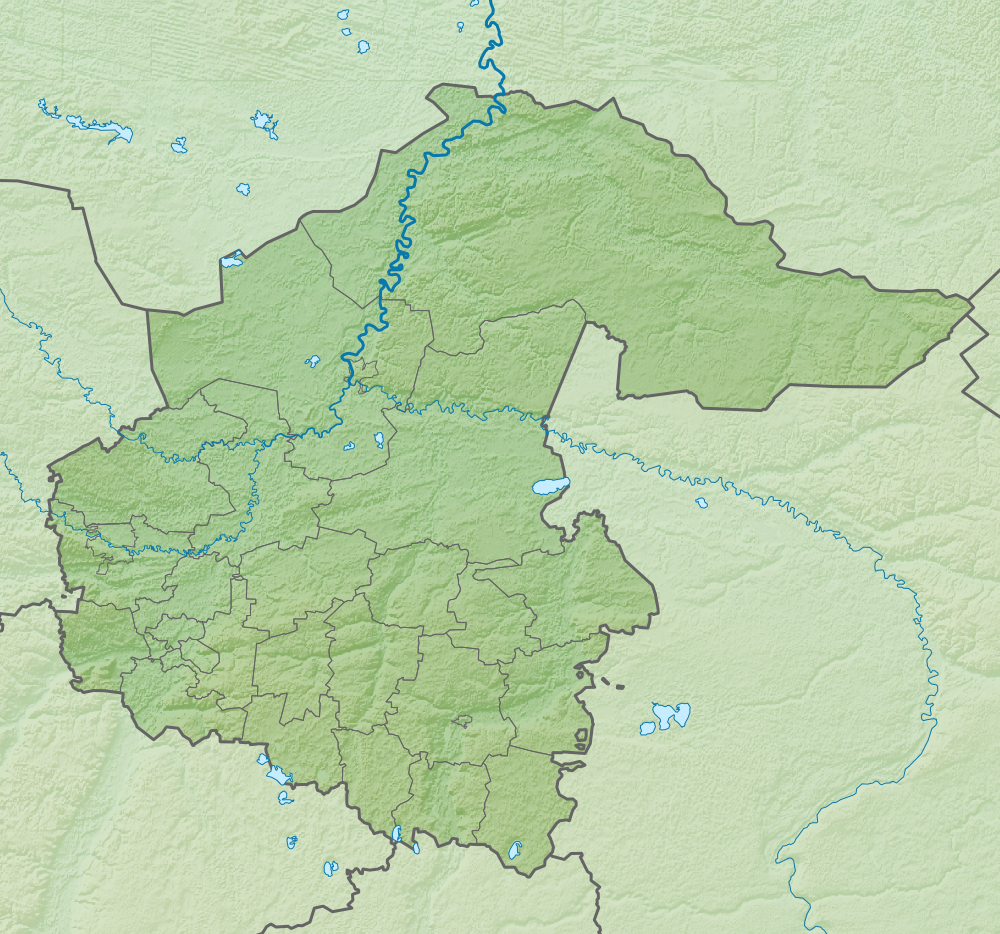
- Location within Kazakhstan Location within Tyumen Oblast
- Location: Ishim Plain; West Siberian Plain
- Coordinates: 55°19′28″N 68°57′47″E
- Type: endorheic
- Primary outflows: none
- Basin countries: Kazakhstan
- Max. length: 8.6 kilometers (5.3 mi)
- Max. width: 3.8 kilometers (2.4 mi)
- Surface area: 25.8 square kilometers (10.0 sq mi)
- Average depth: 3 meters (9.8 ft)
- Max. depth: 4 meters (13 ft)
- Residence time: UTC+6
- Shore length^{1}: 20.9 kilometers (13.0 mi)
- Surface elevation: 120 meters (390 ft)
- ^{1} Shore length is not a well-defined measure.

Akush (Russian: Акуш) or Akysh (Kazakh: Ақыш), is a salt lake in Kyzylzhar District, North Kazakhstan Region, Kazakhstan and Kazan District, Tyumen Oblast, Russian Federation.

The lake is located 35 kilometers (22 mi) to the SSW of Kazanskoye, the district capital in Russia, and 43 kilometers (27 mi) to the NNW of Petropavl city, the regional capital in Kazakhstan. Dubrovnoye village lies 3 kilometers (1.9 mi) to the southwest of the southern end. Lake Akush is located at the Kazakhstan–Russia border, that cuts across the lake in the middle and bends northwards along the eastern shore.

== Geography ==
Akush is an endorheic lake belonging to the Ishim River basin. It is located in an area dotted with small lakes at the southern edge of the Ishim Plain, part of the West Siberian Plain. The lake has an elongated shape, stretching from NNW to SSE for over 8 kilometers (5.0 mi). It has a small bay opening to the northern end. There is a small circular lake close to its eastern lakeshore.

Lake Siverga lies 10 kilometers (6.2 mi) to the northwest, also on the border, and Tavolzhan 60 kilometers (37 mi) to the east. Lake Stanovoye lies in Kazakhstan, 67 kilometers (42 mi) to the southwest and Medvezhye in Russia, 55 kilometers (34 mi) to the WSW.

== See also ==
- List of lakes of Kazakhstan
