= Menkeser =

Lake in Kazakhstan

- Меңкесер / Мәңгісор
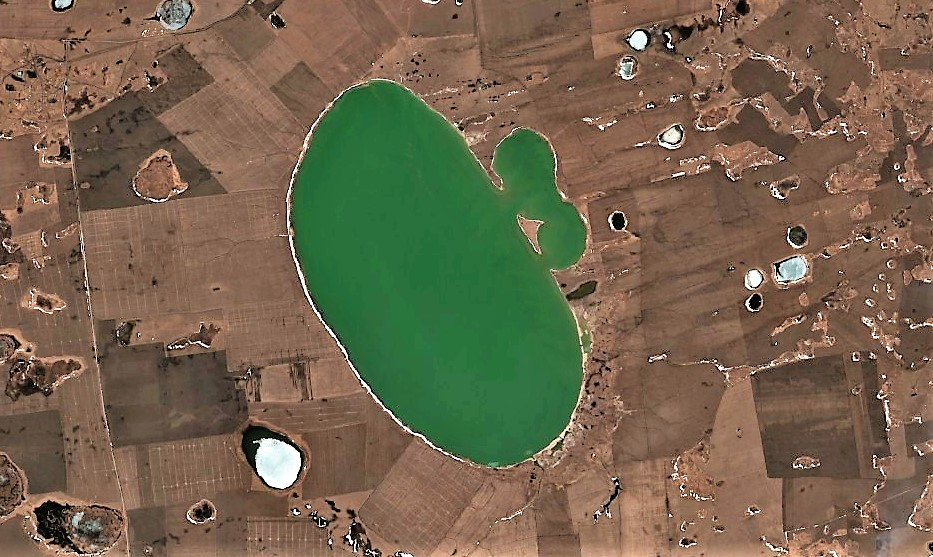
- Sentinel-2 image of the lake

- Location within Kazakhstan
- Location: Ishim Plain; West Siberian Plain
- Coordinates: 54°31′42″N 67°55′51″E
- Type: endorheic
- Primary outflows: none
- Catchment area: 38.04 square kilometers (14.69 sq mi)
- Basin countries: Kazakhstan
- Max. length: 9.1 kilometers (5.7 mi)
- Max. width: 6.1 kilometers (3.8 mi)
- Surface area: 16.4 square kilometers (6.3 sq mi)
- Average depth: 0.4 meters (1 ft 4 in)
- Max. depth: 0.7 meters (2 ft 4 in)
- Water volume: 0.0164 cubic kilometers (0.0039 cu mi)
- Residence time: UTC+6
- Shore length^{1}: 25.1 kilometers (15.6 mi)
- Surface elevation: 123.4 meters (405 ft)
- Islands: one
- ^{1} Shore length is not a well-defined measure.

Menkeser (Kazakh: Меңкесер; Russian: Мангисер) or Mangisor (Kazakh: Мәңгісор), also known as Bulandy (Kazakh: Бұланды), is a salt lake in Mamlyut District, North Kazakhstan Region, Kazakhstan.

The lake is located 57 kilometers (35 mi) to the SW of Mamlyut, the district capital, and 83 kilometers (52 mi) to the SW of Petropavl city, the regional capital. Mengeser village lies 3 kilometers (1.9 mi) to the north and Troitskoye village 15 kilometers (9.3 mi) to the WSW of the western lakeshore.

== Geography ==
Menkeser is an endorheic lake belonging to the Ishim River basin. It is located at the southern edge of the Ishim Plain, part of the West Siberian Plain. It has an oval shape, with a bay in the eastern side with a small island between the landspits delimiting the bay. The shores are flat and the bottom of the lake is covered in greenish silt with a thickness between 0.3 meters (1 ft 0 in) and 0.85 meters (2 ft 9 in).

The lake is surrounded by agricultural fields and pasture land. It is fed by rain and snow. Lake Alua lies 20 kilometers (12 mi) to the southeast, Stanovoye 30 kilometers (19 mi) to the northeast, and lake Filatovo 60 kilometers (37 mi) to the northwest, just beyond the Kazakhstan–Russia border.

== See also ==
- List of lakes of Kazakhstan
