= Sladkovo =

Sladkovo (Russian: Сладково) is the name of several rural localities in Russia:

- Sladkovo, Orenburg Oblast, a selo in Sladkovsky Selsoviet of Ileksky District of Orenburg Oblast
- Sladkovo, Tyumen Oblast, a selo in Sladkovsky District of Tyumen Oblast
