= Filatovo =

Filatovo may refer to:

- Filatovo (Gus-Khrustalny District), a village in Vladimir Oblast, Russia
- Filatovo (lake), a body of water in Kurgan Oblast, Russia
