= Shelegino =

Lake in Kazakhstan

- Шелегино
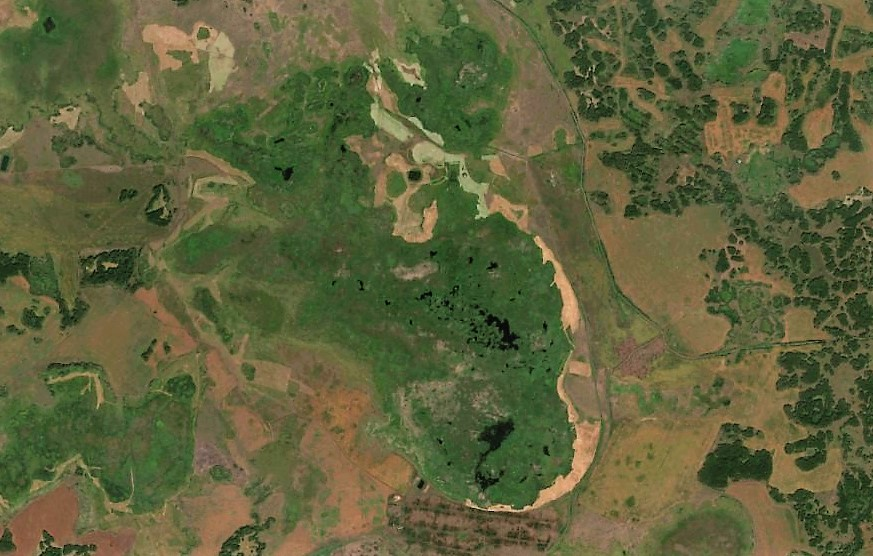
- Sentinel-2 image of the lake in August

- Location within Kazakhstan
- Location: Ishim Plain
- Coordinates: 55°07′12″N 70°00′45″E
- Type: endorheic
- Catchment area: 348 square kilometers (134 sq mi)
- Basin countries: Kazakhstan
- Max. length: 6.5 kilometers (4.0 mi)
- Max. width: 3.7 kilometers (2.3 mi)
- Surface area: 15.5 square kilometers (6.0 sq mi) to 21.7 square kilometers (8.4 sq mi)
- Max. depth: 2.3 meters (7 ft 7 in)
- Residence time: UTC+6
- Surface elevation: 132.3 meters (434 ft)

Shelegino (Kazakh: Шелегино; Russian: Шелегино) is a lake in Magzhan Zhumabayev and Kyzylzhar districts, North Kazakhstan Region, Kazakhstan. The border between the two districts runs across the lake from northwest to southeast.

Bulayevo, the district capital, is located 35 kilometers (22 mi) to the southeast. The Kazakhstan–Russia border lies 3 kilometers (1.9 mi) to the north of the lake. The water of the lake is used for drinking purposes. The banks are a pasture zone for local cattle.

== Geography ==
Shelegino is an endorheic lake of the Ishim river basin. It lies at the southern edge of the Ishim Plain, part of the West Siberian Plain. The surface of the lake is 15.5 square kilometers (6.0 sq mi), increasing to 21.7 square kilometers (8.4 sq mi) during floods. Lake Kamysty lies 30 kilometers (19 mi) to the SSE and Tavolzhan only 10 kilometers (6.2 mi) to the NNE on the other side of the border.

Shelegino is a drying lake. Its water level has dropped significantly in recent decades and currently there are only a few residual pools left. Most of the remaining surface of the lake is swampy. The lakeshore is flat and the bottom is smooth and clayey. The thickness of the silt layer varies between 0.1 meters (3.9 in) and 0.7 meters (2 ft 4 in). The water is soft and hardens at the end of summer with a mineralization varying between 0.3 grams per liter (0.048 oz/imp gal) and 0.8 grams per liter (0.13 oz/imp gal).

== Flora and fauna ==
Shelegino is surrounded by steppe and marshy areas, Reeds cover most of the shallow parts of the surface and sedges and willows grow near the shore. Few spots in the middle of the lake are not encumbered with aquatic vegetation. Migratory birds such as the greater flamingo visit the lake seasonally.

== See also ==
- List of lakes of Kazakhstan
