= Makushino =

Makushino (Russian: Макушино) is the name of several inhabited localities in Russia.

Urban localities

- Makushino, Kurgan Oblast, a town in Makushinsky District of Kurgan Oblast

Rural localities

- Makushino, Novgorod Oblast, a village in Yedrovskoye Settlement of Valdaysky District in Novgorod Oblast
- Makushino, Pskov Oblast, a village in Opochetsky District of Pskov Oblast
