= Beskol, North Kazakhstan Region =

Beskol Бескөл
- Village
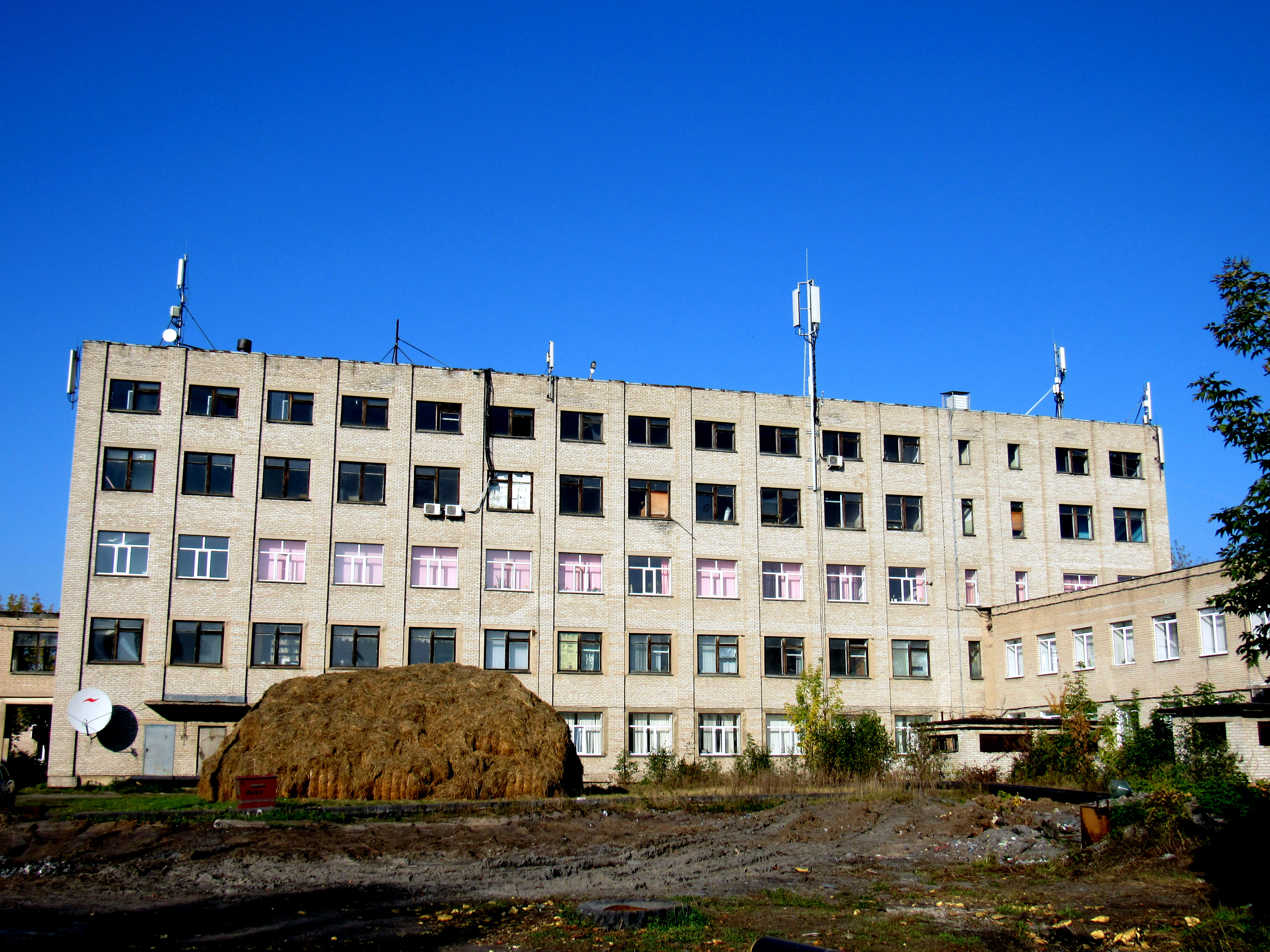

- Location in Kazakhstan
- Coordinates: 54°46′30″N 69°06′10″E
- Country: Kazakhstan
- Region: North Kazakhstan Region
- District: Kyzylzhar District
- Rural District: Beskol Rural District
- Established: 1938

Population (2023)
  - Total: 13,027
- Time zone: UTC+6 (East Kazakhstan Time)
- Post code: 150700

Beskol (Kazakh: Бескөл; Russian: Бесколь) is a settlement and the administrative center of Kyzylzhar District in North Kazakhstan Region, Kazakhstan. It is the head of the Beskol Rural District (KATO code - 595030100). Population: 8,805 (2009 census results); 7,495 (1999 census results).

== Geography ==
Beskol is located 8 kilometers (5.0 mi) to the south of Petropavl, the regional capital. Lake Akush lies at the Kazakhstan–Russia border 50 kilometers (31 mi) to the north. The A1 highway passes through the town.

== Notable people ==
- Alexander Vinokurov, a Kazakh professional cyclist and Olympic champion was born in Beskol.
