= Stanovoye =

Salt lake in Mamlyut District, North Kazakhstan Region, Kazakhstan

- Становое
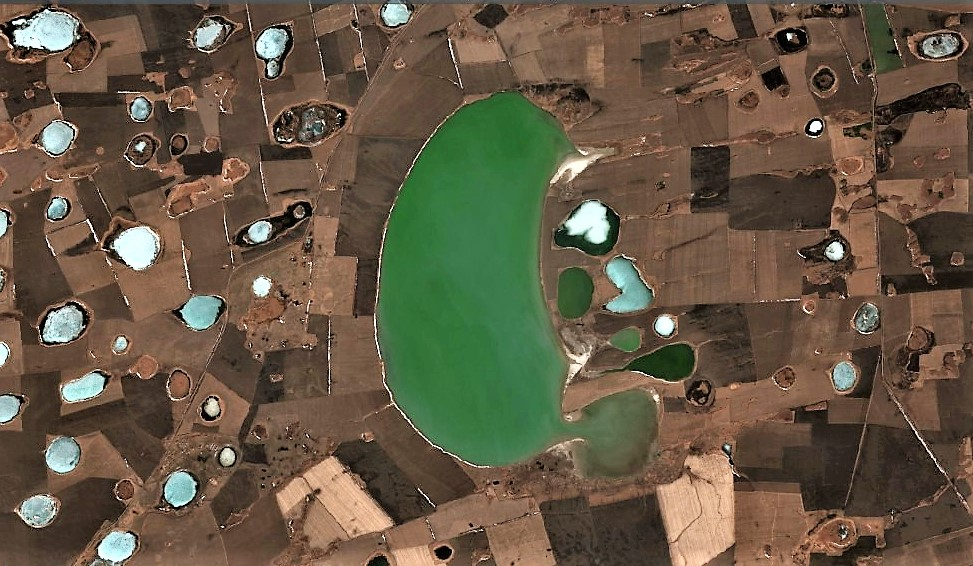
- Sentinel-2 image of the lake and surroundings

- Location within Kazakhstan
- Location: Ishim Plain; West Siberian Plain
- Coordinates: 54°45′23″N 68°19′53″E
- Type: endorheic
- Primary outflows: none
- Basin countries: Kazakhstan
- Max. length: 9.4 kilometers (5.8 mi)
- Max. width: 4.5 kilometers (2.8 mi)
- Surface area: 29.8 square kilometers (11.5 sq mi)
- Residence time: UTC+6
- Shore length^{1}: 32.6 kilometers (20.3 mi)
- Surface elevation: 119 meters (390 ft)
- ^{1} Shore length is not a well-defined measure.

Stanovoye (Kazakh: Становое), is a salt lake in Mamlyut District, North Kazakhstan Region, Kazakhstan.

The lake is located 20 kilometers (12 mi) to the SW of Mamlyut, the district capital, and 45 kilometers (28 mi) to the WSW of Petropavl city, the regional capital. Stanovoye village lies 2.5 kilometers (1.6 mi) to the north of the northern lakeshore.

== Geography ==
Stanovoye is an endorheic lake belonging to the Ishim River basin. It is located in an area dotted with small lakes at the southern edge of the Ishim Plain, part of the West Siberian Plain. The lake has an elongated shape, stretching from north to south for over 9 kilometers (5.6 mi). It has a shallow bay opening to the southeastern end. There are four small lakes close to its eastern lakeshore.

Stanovoye is fed by rain and snow. The bottom of the lake is muddy and the mud is reputed to have medicinal properties. Lake Menkeser lies 30 kilometers (19 mi) to the southwest and lake Alua 35 kilometers (22 mi) to the south. Lakes Akush and Siverga are located at the Kazakhstan–Russia border roughly 67 kilometers (42 mi) to the northeast, and Medvezhye 45 kilometers (28 mi) to the NNW, to the north of the border.

== Flora ==
Typha and other kind of reeds grow in stretches of the lakeshore. The agricultural fields and pasture land surrounding the lake are used by the adjacent settlements.

== See also ==
- List of lakes of Kazakhstan
