= Sladkovsky =

Sladkovsky (masculine), Sladkovskaya (feminine), or Sladkovskoye (neuter) may refer to:

- Sladkovsky District, a district of Tyumen Oblast, Russia
- Sladkovskoye, a rural locality (a selo) in Sverdlovsk Oblast, Russia
