= Medvezhye (Kurgan Oblast) =

Body of water in Petukhovsky District, Kurgan Oblast, Russian Federation

- Медвежье
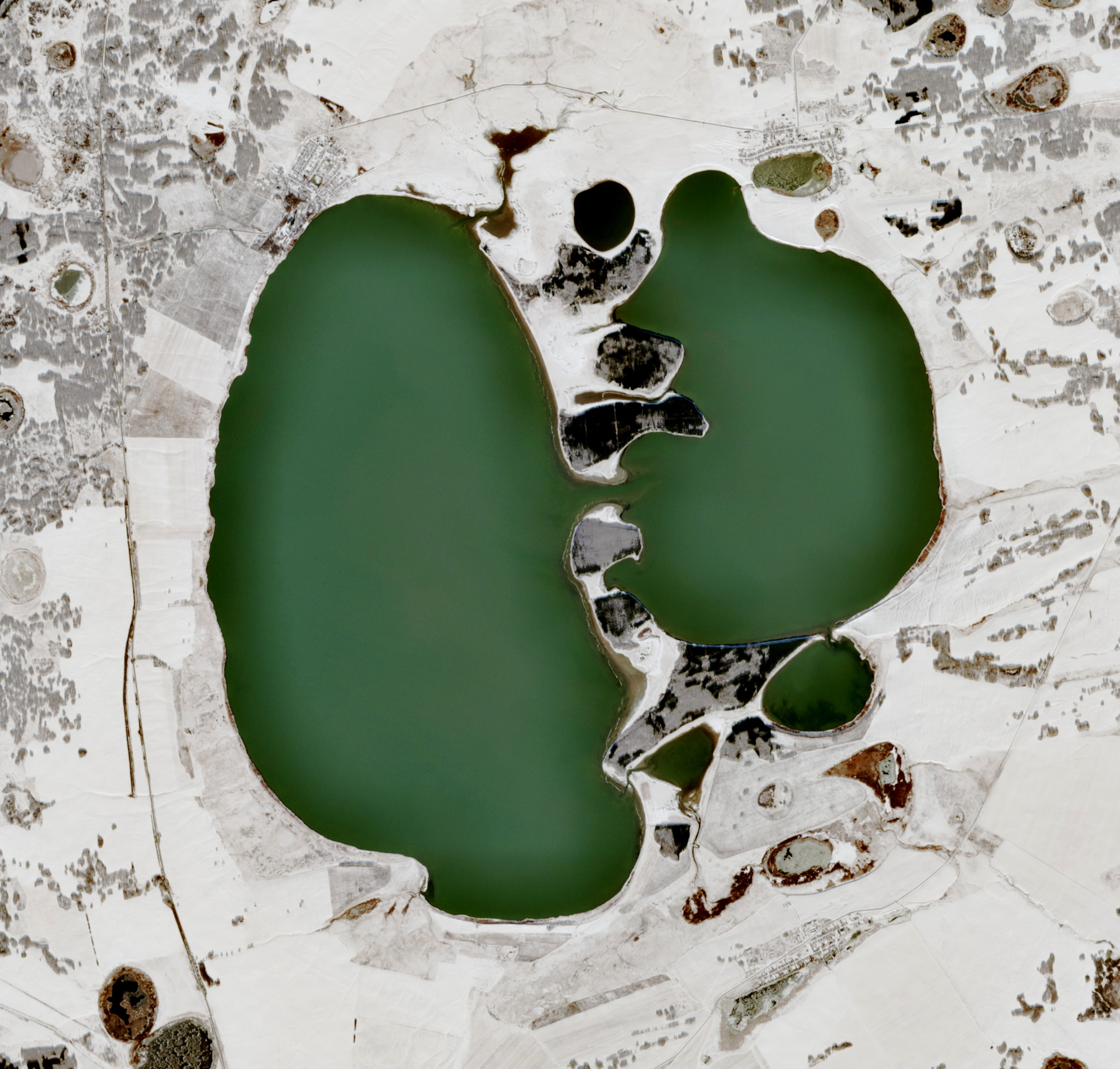
- Sentinel-2 picture of the lake

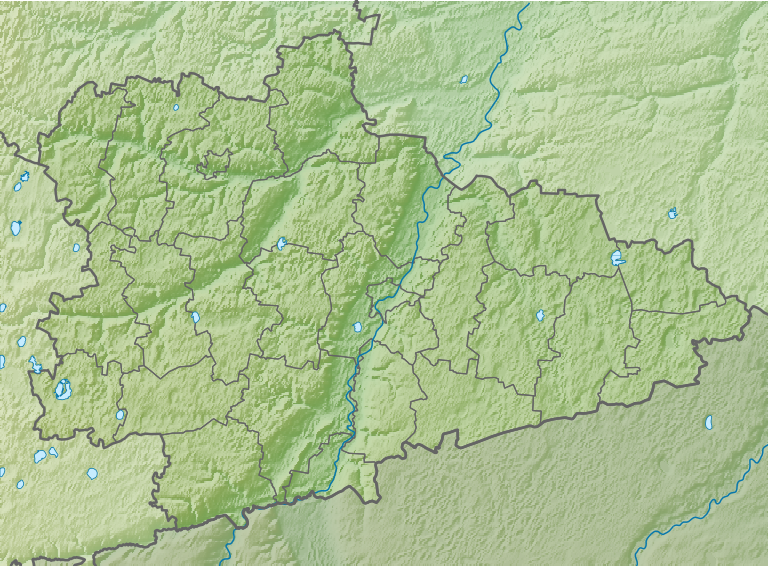
- Location within Kurgan Oblast Location within Russia
- Location: West Siberian Plain
- Coordinates: 55°12′00″N 68°01′00″E
- Type: endorheic
- Basin countries: Russia
- Max. length: 9.9 kilometers (6.2 mi)
- Max. width: 5.3 kilometers (3.3 mi)
- Surface area: 63.88 square kilometers (24.66 sq mi)
- Average depth: 0.6 meters (2 ft 0 in)
- Max. depth: 1.2 meters (3 ft 11 in)
- Surface elevation: 111 meters (364 ft)

Medvezhye (Russian: Медвежье озеро), meaning "bear lake", is a body of water in Petukhovsky District, Kurgan Oblast, Russian Federation.

There are two settlements by the lake Kurort Ozero Medvezhye and Novoye Ilinskoye. The mud of the lake is deemed to have medicinal properties. According to legend a bear with a sore paw dipped it in the lake and was healed. Lake Medvezhye is a protected area.

== Geography ==
Medvezhye is a salt lake located in the Ishim Plain, the southern part of the West Siberian Plain. The middle of the lake has a section stretching from north to south of irregular-shaped islands and peninsulas with marshy stretches in between. This section is roughly 1.5 kilometers (0.93 mi) wide and divides the lake into two parts: Big Medvezhye (Bolshoye Medvezhye) on the western and Small Medvezhye (Maloye Medvezhye) on the eastern side. A narrow sound in the middle connects both sides. The bottom of the lake is flat and muddy.

The area where Medvezhye lies is dotted with small lakes. Lake Sazykul lies 25 kilometers (16 mi) to the northwest, Siverga 43 kilometers (27 mi) to the northeast and Akush 55 kilometers (34 mi) to the ENE. Lake Filatovo lies 67 kilometers (42 mi) to the southwest by the Kazakhstan-Russia border, and Stanovoye lies in Kazakhstan 45 kilometers (28 mi) to the SSE.

== Fauna ==
During the summer Artemia salina crustaceans breed in large numbers in the lake. There are no fish in its waters.

== See also ==
- List of lakes of Russia
