= Presnovka (Zhambyl District) =

Presnovka Пресновка
- Village
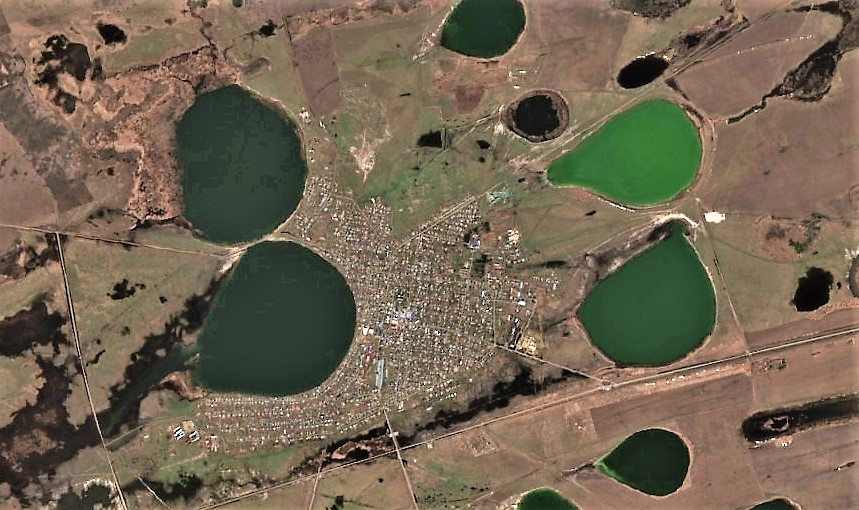
- Presnovka is located between four small lakes

- Location in Kazakhstan
- Coordinates: 54°40′00″N 67°08′36″E
- Country: Kazakhstan
- Region: North Kazakhstan Region
- District: Zhambyl District
- Rural District: Presnov Rural District

Population (2019)
  - Total: 5,322
- Time zone: UTC+6 (East Kazakhstan Time)
- Post code: 150600

Presnovka (Kazakh: Пресновка) is a village and the administrative center of Zhambyl District, North Kazakhstan Region, Kazakhstan. It is also the head of Presnov Rural District (KATO code - 594630100). Presnovka was founded as a military fort in March 1752. Population: 5,725 (2009 census results); 6,585 (1999 census results).

== Geography ==
Presnovka lies near the Kazakhstan-Russia border, 12 kilometers (7.5 mi) to the south of lake Filatovo and 49 kilometers (30 mi) to the west of lake Menkeser.
