= Mamlyut District =

Coordinates: 54°56′35″N 68°30′00″E

Mamlyut
- District
- Мамлют ауданы
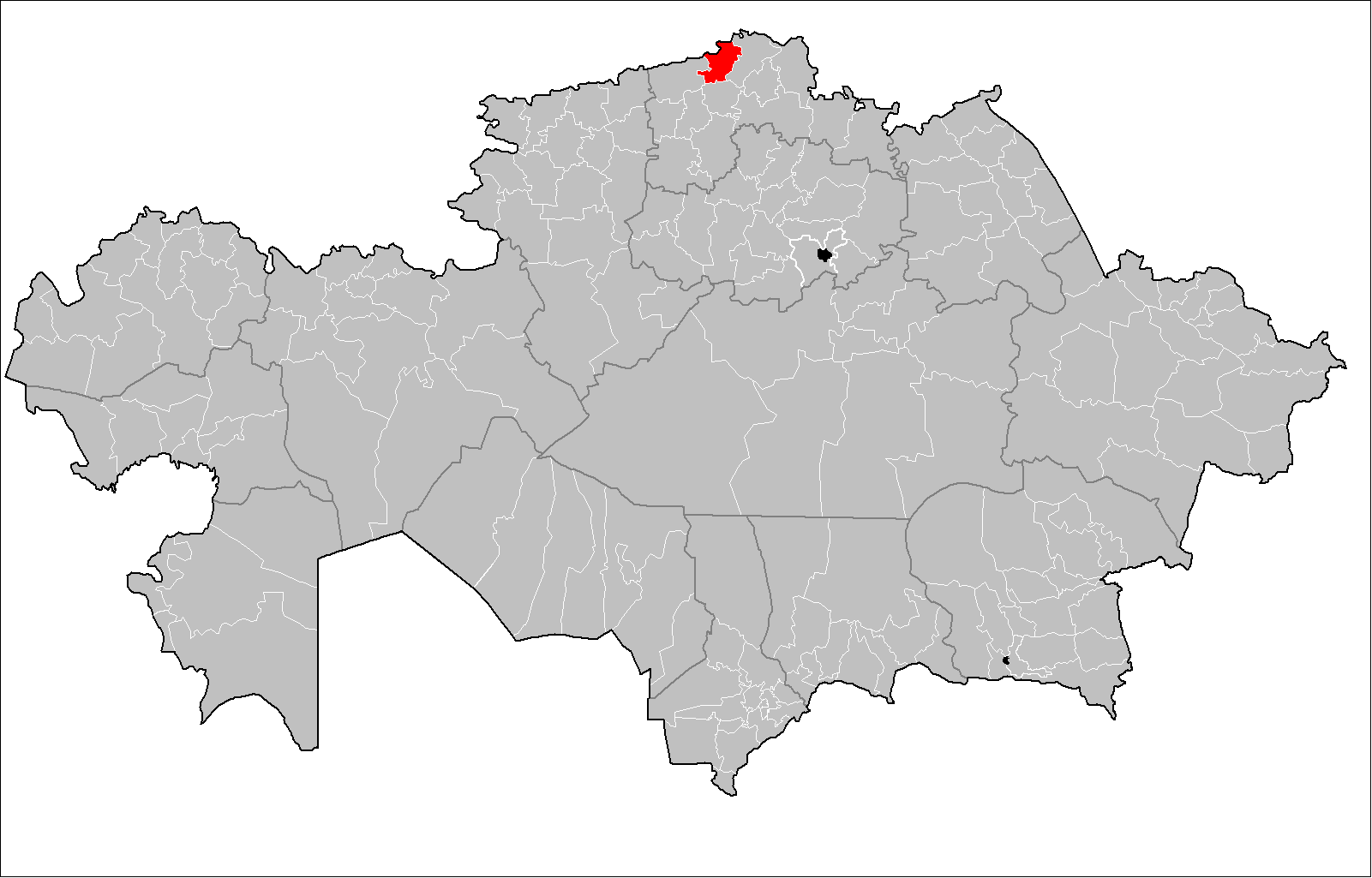
- Country: Kazakhstan
- Region: North Kazakhstan Region
- Administrative center: Mamlyut

Government
  - Akim: Yelena Stepanenko

Population (2013)
  - Total: 20,241
- Time zone: UTC+6 (East)

Mamlyut (Kazakh: Мамлют ауданы, Mamliut audany) is a district of North Kazakhstan Region in northern Kazakhstan. The administrative center of the district is the town of Mamlyut. Population: 20,241 (2013 estimate); 21,369 (2009 census results); 29,110 (1999 census results).

== Geography ==
The district is located in the Ishim Plain and it is dotted with lakes. Menkeser and Stanovoye are the largest ones. The Kazakhstan–Russia border limits Mamlyut District to the north.
