= Kyzylzhar District =

Coordinates: 54°51′N 69°15′E

Kyzylzhar
- District
- Қызылжар ауданы
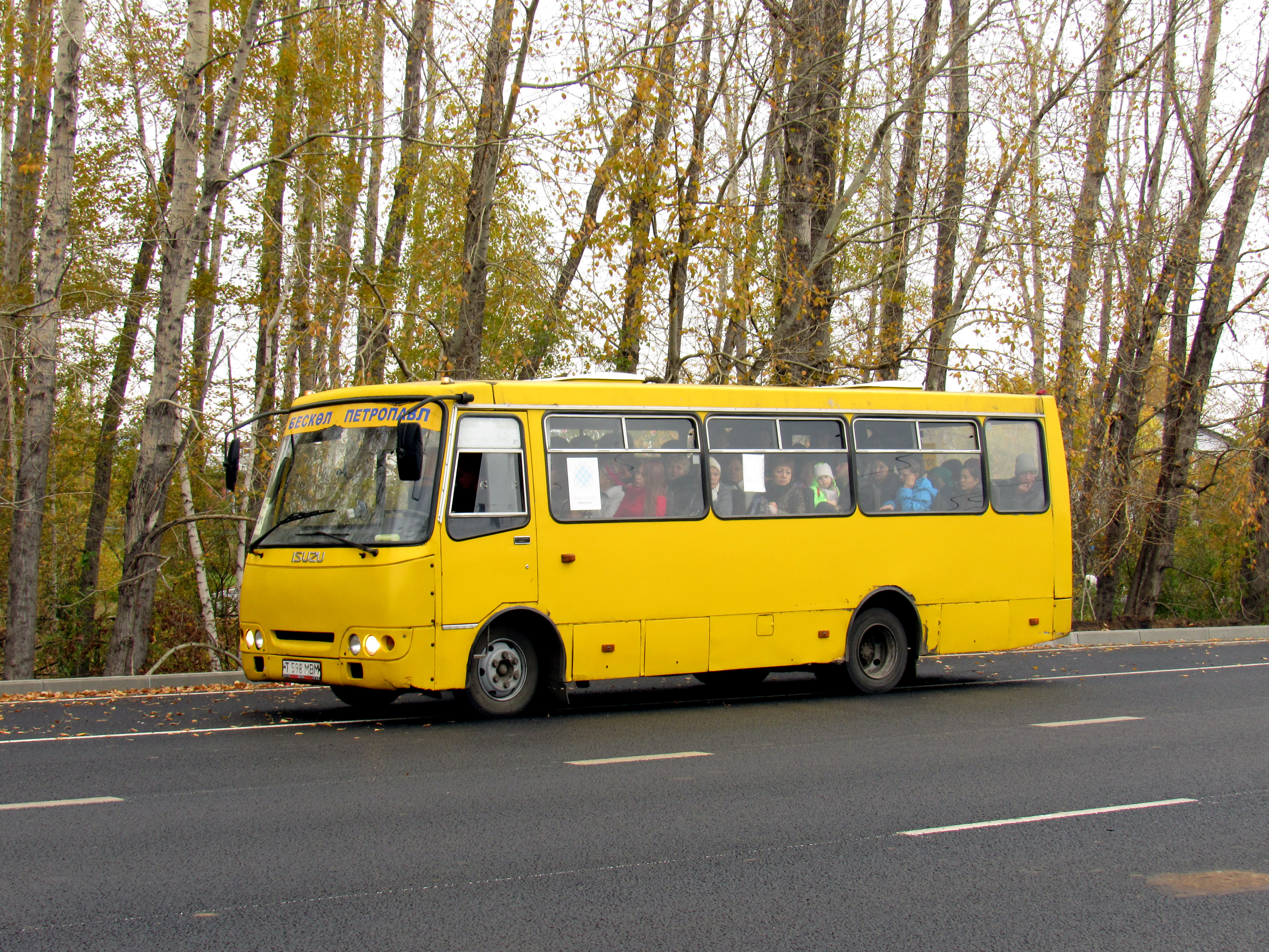
- Kyzylzhar District bus

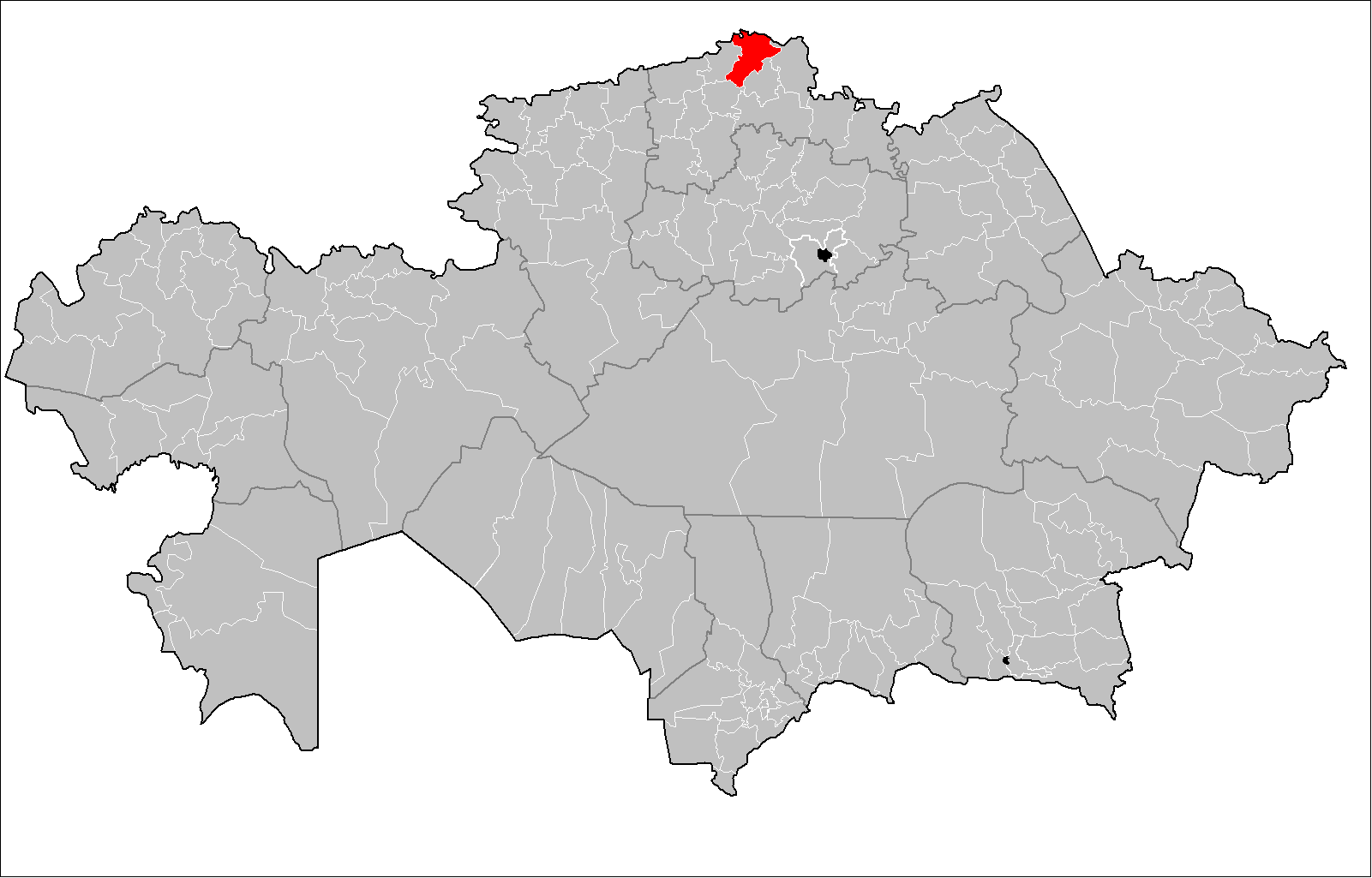
- Country: Kazakhstan
- Region: North Kazakhstan Region
- Administrative center: Beskol

Government
  - Akim (mayor): Beibut Ismanov

Population (2013)
  - Total: 44,681
- Time zone: UTC+6 (East)

Kyzylzhar (Kazakh: Қызылжар ауданы, Qyzyljar audany) is a district of North Kazakhstan Region in northern Kazakhstan. The administrative center of the district is Beskol. Population: 44,681 (2013 estimate); 44,454 (2009 census results); 50,258 (1999 census results).

== Geography ==
The district capital Beskol is located 8 kilometers (5.0 mi) to the south of Petropavl, the regional capital. The A1 highway passes through Kyzylzhar District. Lakes Akush, Siverga and Shelegino lie at the Kazakhstan–Russia border in the northern limit of the district.
