= Tavolzhan =

Lake in Tyumen Oblast, Russia

- Таволжан / Солёное
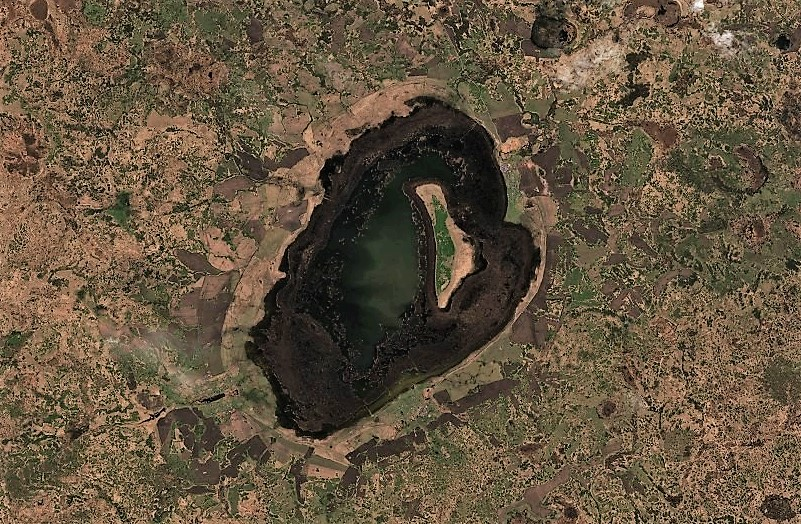
- Sentinel-2 image of the lake in May

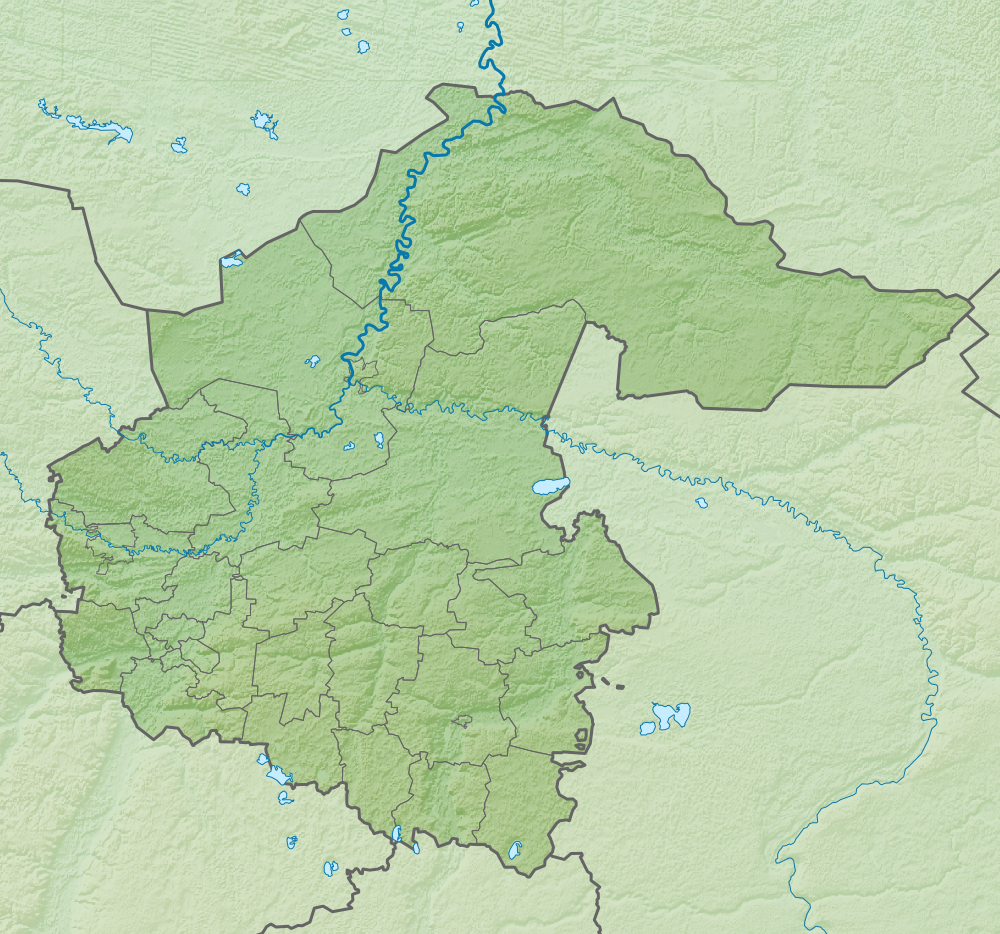
- Location within Tyumen Oblast Location within Russia
- Location: West Siberian Plain
- Coordinates: 55°18′41″N 70°03′35″E
- Type: endorheic
- Basin countries: Russian Federation
- Max. length: 16.2 kilometers (10.1 mi)
- Max. width: 7.5 kilometers (4.7 mi)
- Surface area: 71 square kilometers (27 sq mi)
- Residence time: UTC+5
- Surface elevation: 120 meters (390 ft)
- Islands: Tavolzhan Island

Tavolzhan (Russian: Озеро Таволжан), also known as Solyonoye (Russian: Озеро Солёное) is a salt lake in Sladkovsky District, Tyumen Oblast, Russian Federation.

The lake is the largest in the district and is located 20 kilometers (12 mi) to the southwest of Sladkovo, the district capital. Tavolzhan village lies by the eastern lakeshore, Alexandrovka close to the southwestern end and Mikhailovka near the southern shore. The nearest city is Petropavl in Kazakhstan, 63 kilometers (39 mi) to the southwest of the southern end.

== Geography ==
Tavolzhan is an endorheic lake located in an area dotted with small lakes of the Ishim Plain, part of the West Siberian Plain. The lake extends from northeast to southwest for almost 16 kilometers (9.9 mi). It has a 5.4 kilometers (3.4 mi) long island, Tavolzhan Island, stretching along the eastern shore, opposite Tavolzhan village. During dry spells the level of the lake sinks and the island becomes attached to the mainland. Even in periods of drought lake Tavolzhan does not dry out, and in winter its surface gets frozen.

Lakes Akush and Siverga are located 60 kilometers (37 mi) to the west and Shelegino only 10 kilometers (6.2 mi) to the SSW. The Kazakhstan–Russia border lies 5 kilometers (3.1 mi) to the south of the southern lakeshore.

== Flora and fauna ==
The area of the lake is mainly forest-steppe, with birch-aspen forest in the southern part of Tavolzhan Island. Yellow-flowered Adonis volgensis grows near the banks and there are reed thickets in stretches of the lakeshore. Two species of Zannichellia submerged aquatic plants are found in the waters. Tavolzhan is located in a major migration route for birds. The protected species permanently living in the lake include the white-tailed eagle, which nests in the southern part of the island, the great grey shrike, the great jerboa and the winter white dwarf hamster. The area around the lake also provides a habitat for the Siberian roe deer.

Tavolzhan is part of the "Tobol-Ishim Forest-steppe" Ramsar site. A 35,000 hectares (86,000 acres) officially protected area of the Russian Federation has been proposed to be established in lake Tavolzhan.

== See also ==
- List of lakes of Russia
- List of Ramsar sites in Russia
