= Sladkovo, Tyumen Oblast =

Rural locality in Tyumen Oblast, Russia

Sladkovo Сладково
- Selo
- Interactive map of Sladkovo
- Location of Sladkovo Sladkovo (Tyumen Oblast)
- Coordinates: 55°31′37″N 70°19′59″E
- Country: Russia
- Federal subject: Tyumen Oblast
- Administrative district: Sladkovsky District
- Founded: 1782

Population (2010 Census)
  - Total: 3,303
  - Estimate (2021): 3,438 (+4.1%)
- Time zone: UTC+5 (MSK+2)
- Postal code: 627610
- OKTMO ID: 71636445101

Sladkovo (Russian: Сладково) is a rural locality (a selo) and the administrative center of Sladkovsky District, Tyumen Oblast, Russia. Population: 3,303 (2010 census); 3,477 (2002 census); 3,651 (1989 Soviet census).

== Geography ==
Sladkovo lies in the Ishim Plain, 20 kilometers (12 mi) to the northeast of lake Tavolzhan (Solyonoye), the largest lake in the district.
