= Mamlyut =

Mamlyut Мамлют
- City
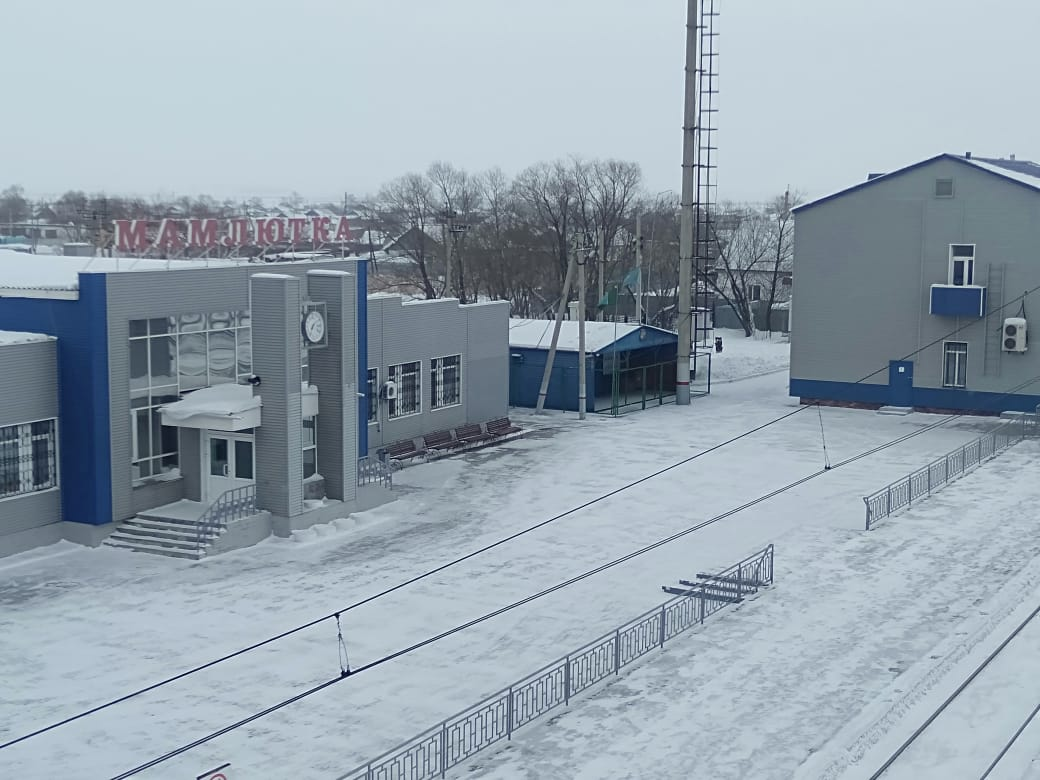

- Location in Kazakhstan
- Coordinates: 54°56′15″N 68°32′22″E
- Country: Kazakhstan
- Region: North Kazakhstan Region
- District: Mamlyut District

Government
  - Akim (mayor): Serik Bakeev

Population (2013)
  - Total: 7,320
- Time zone: UTC+6 (Asia/Almaty)
- Postal code: 150900
- Website: http://www.maml.sko.kz

Mamlyut (Kazakh: Мамлют; Russian: Мамлютка) is a town (till 1969 a village) in Mamlyut District, North Kazakhstan Region, Kazakhstan. It is the capital of the district and the only settlement of the Mamlyut City Administration (KATO code 595220100).

== Geography ==
Mamlyut is located in an area of small lakes. Larger lake Stanovoye is located 20 kilometers (12 mi) to the southwest. There is a railway station on the Kurgan — Petropavl line in the town. The highest temperature recorded in Mamlyut was 39.9 °C 103.8 °F
