= Filatovo (Gus-Khrustalny District) =

Filatovo Филатово
- Village
- Location within Vladimir Oblast Location within Russia
- Coordinates: 55°19′N 41°00′E
- Country: Russia
- Region: Vladimir Oblast
- District: Gus-Khrustalny District
- Time zone: UTC+3:00

Filatovo (Russian: Филатово) is a rural locality (a village) in Kupreyevskoye Rural Settlement, Gus-Khrustalny District, Vladimir Oblast, Russia. The population was 174 as of 2010.

== Geography ==
Filatovo is located 55 km southeast of Gus-Khrustalny (the district's administrative centre) by road. Yakimets is the nearest rural locality.
