= Makushinsky District =

Makushinsky District Макушинский район
- District
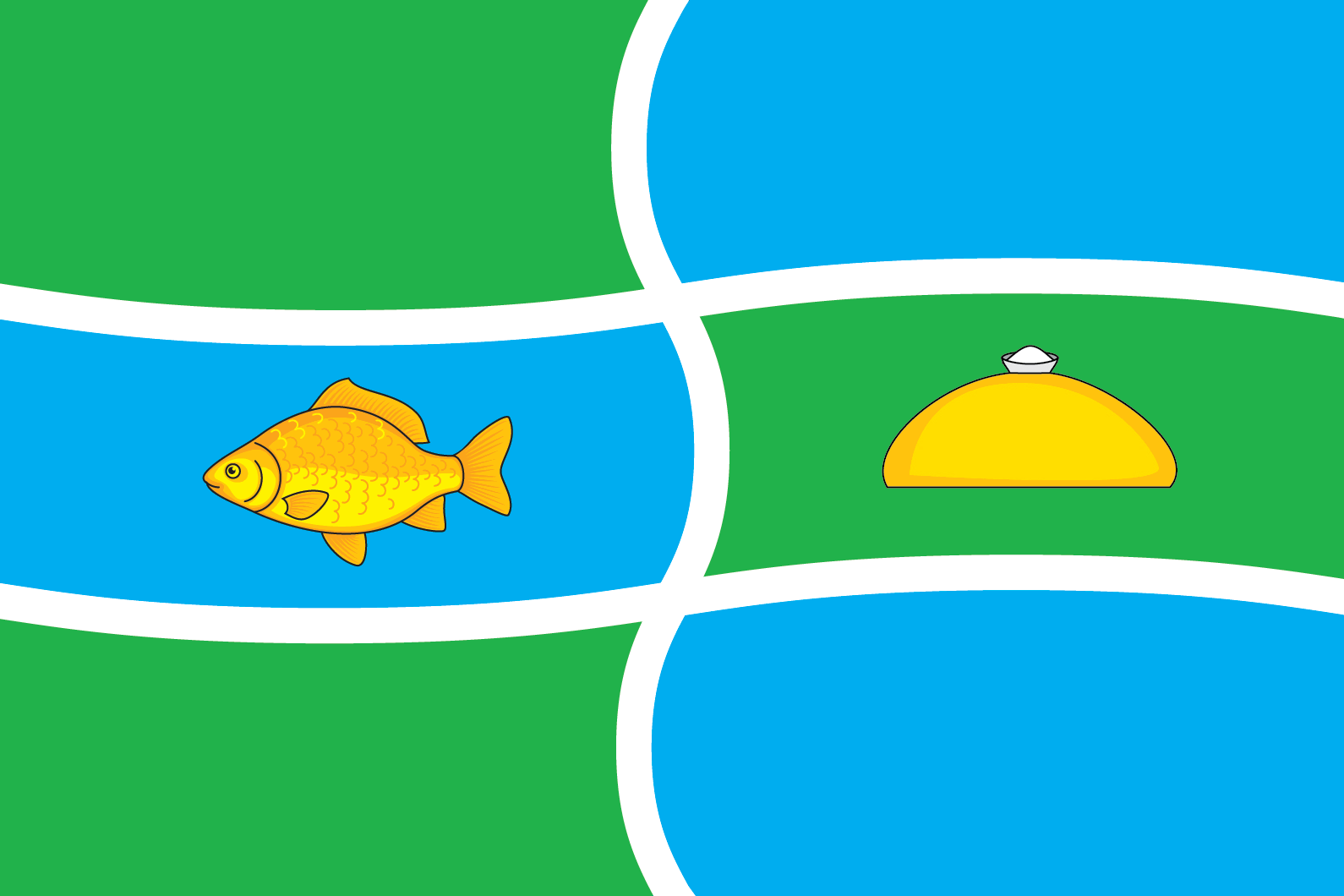
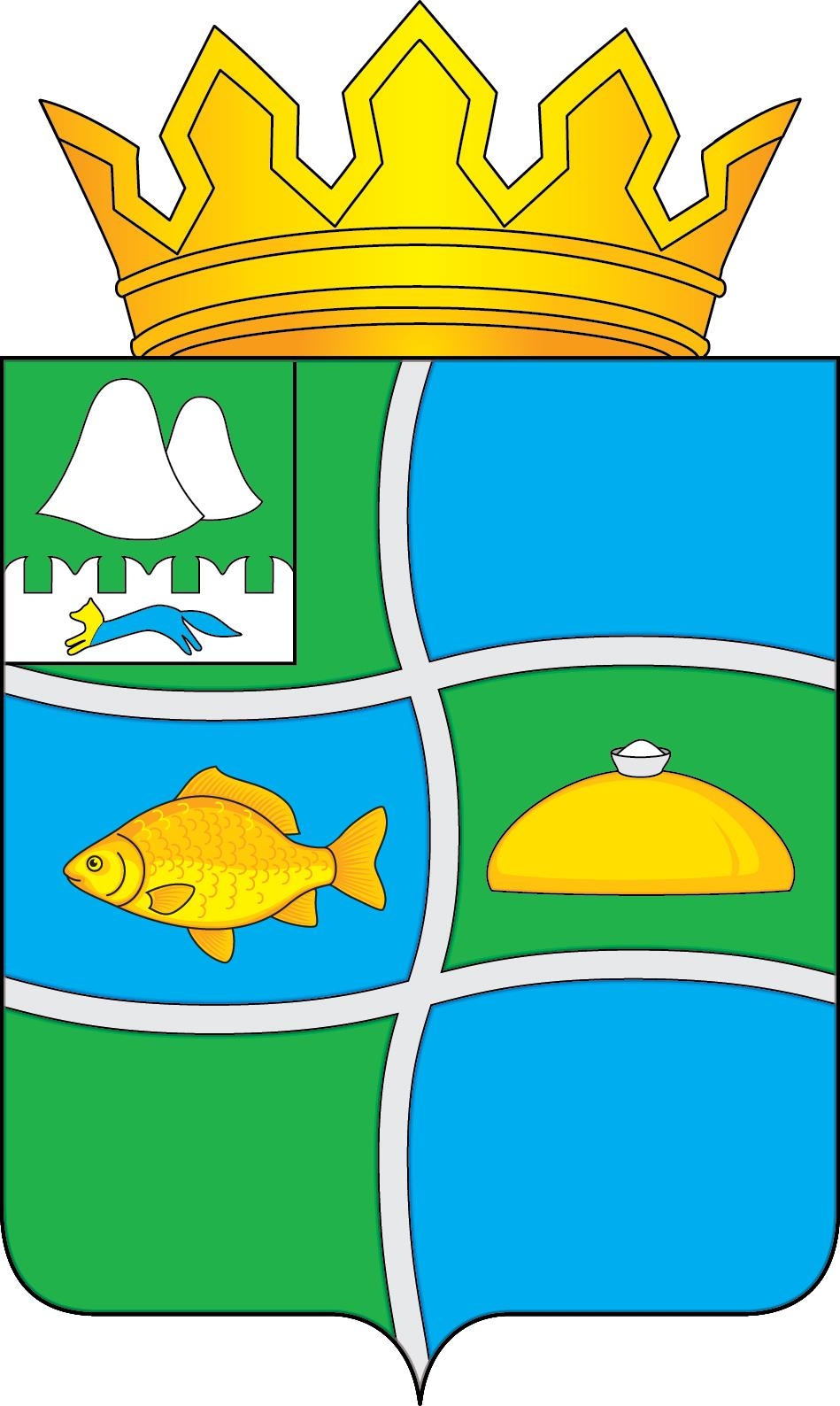
- Flag Coat of arms
- Location of Makushinsky District in Kurgan Oblast
- Coordinates: 55°15′0″N 67°15′0″E
- Country: Russia
- Federal subject: Kurgan Oblast
- Established: 1924
- Administrative center: Makushino

Area
  - Total: 3,470 km^{2} (1,340 sq mi)

Population (2010 Census)
  - Total: 18,116
  - Density: 5.22/km^{2} (13.5/sq mi)
  - Urban: 46.0%
  - Rural: 54.0%

Administrative structure
  - Administrative divisions: 1 Towns under district jurisdiction, 18 Selsoviets
  - Inhabited localities: 1 cities/towns, 46 rural localities

Municipal structure
  - Municipally incorporated as: Makushinsky Municipal District
  - Municipal divisions: 1 urban settlements, 18 rural settlements
- Time zone: UTC+5 (MSK+2)
- OKTMO ID: 37620000
- Website: http://makushino-45.ru/

Makushinsky District (Russian: Макушинский райо́н) is an administrative and municipal district (raion), one of the twenty-four in Kurgan Oblast, Russia. It is located in the east of the oblast. The area of the district is 3,470 square kilometers (1,340 sq mi). Its administrative center is the town of Makushino. Population: 18,116 (2010 Census); 23,978 (2002 Census); 25,755 (1989 Soviet census). The population of Makushino accounts for 46.0% of the district's total population.

== Geography ==
The Kazakhstan–Russia border limits the southern side of Makushinsky District. Lake Filatovo is located in the district.
