= Zhambyl District, North Kazakhstan Region =

Coordinates: 54°31′48″N 66°56′24″E

Zhambyl District
- District
- Жамбыл ауданы
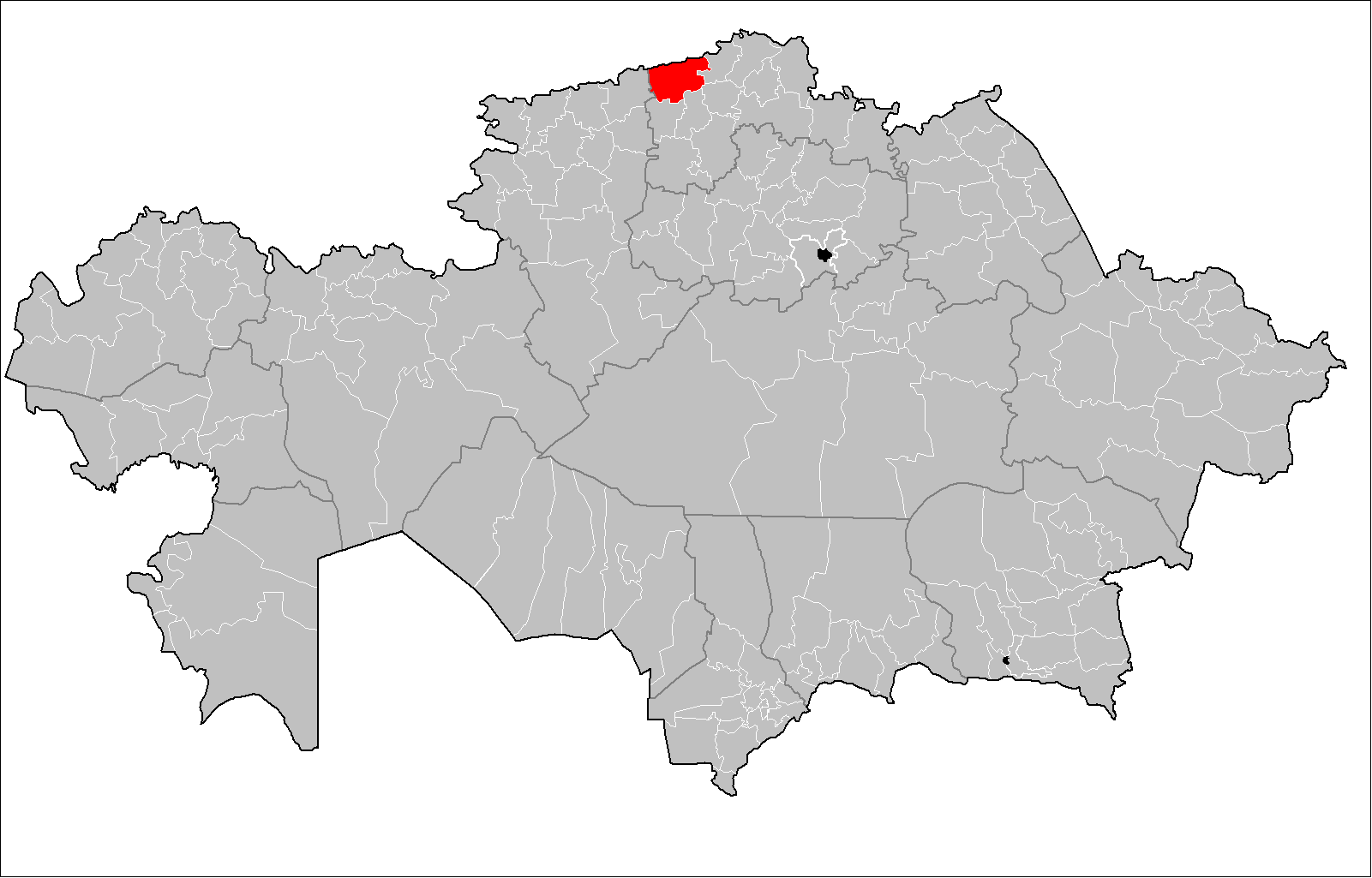
- Country: Kazakhstan
- Region: North Kazakhstan
- Administrative center: Presnovka

Government
  - Akim: Azamat Bektasov

Population (2013)
  - Total: 23,557
- Time zone: UTC+6 (East)

Zhambyl District (Kazakh: Жамбыл ауданы, Jambyl audany) is a district of North Kazakhstan Region in northern Kazakhstan. The administrative center of the district is the selo of Presnovka. Population: 23,557 (2013 estimate); 25,378 (2009 census results); 36,989 (1999 census results).
