= Kazanskoye, Kazansky District, Tyumen Oblast =

Rural locality in Tyumen Oblast, Russia

Coordinates: 55°38′42″N 69°14′12″E

Kazanskoye (Russian: Казанское) is a rural locality (a selo) and the administrative center of Kazansky District, Tyumen Oblast, Russia. Population: 5,932 (2010 census); 5,889 (2002 census); 5,975 (1989 Soviet census).
