= Makushino, Kurgan Oblast =

Town in Kurgan Oblast, Russia

Makushino Макушино
- Town
- Interactive map of Makushino
- Location of Makushino Makushino (Kurgan Oblast)
- Coordinates: 55°13′N 67°16′E
- Country: Russia
- Federal subject: Kurgan Oblast
- Administrative district: Makushinsky District
- Town under district jurisdictionSelsoviet: Makushino
- Founded: 1797
- Town status since: 1963
- Elevation: 140 m (460 ft)

Population (2010 Census)
  - Total: 8,338
  - Estimate (2025): 6,603 (−20.8%)

Administrative status
  - Capital of: Makushinsky District, Makushino Town Under District Jurisdiction

Municipal status
  - Municipal district: Makushinsky Municipal District
  - Urban settlement: Makushino Urban Settlement
  - Capital of: Makushinsky Municipal District, Makushino Urban Settlement
- Time zone: UTC+5 (MSK+2)
- Postal codes: 641600–641602, 641639
- OKTMO ID: 37620101001
- Website: www.makushino45.ru

Makushino (Russian: Маку́шино) is a town and the administrative center of Makushinsky District in Kurgan Oblast, Russia, located 181 kilometers (112 mi) east of Kurgan, the administrative center of the oblast. Population: 8,338 (2010 census); 9,942 (2002 census); 10,535 (1989 Soviet census).

== History ==
It was founded by the migrant peasants who moved there from Central Russia. In 1896, a railway station was built in the vicinity and the settlement grew up around it. Town status was granted to it in 1963.

== Administrative and municipal status ==
Within the framework of administrative divisions, Makushino serves as the administrative center of Makushinsky District. As an administrative division, it is incorporated within Makushinsky District as Makushino Town Under District Jurisdiction. As a municipal division, Makushino Town Under District Jurisdiction is incorporated within Makushinsky Municipal District as Makushino Urban Settlement.
