= A1 highway (Kazakhstan) =

Road in Kazakhstan

Route map.

A1 is a national highway in Kazakhstan that runs from Astana to Petropavl with a total length of 456 kilometres (283 mi). It is part of the European route E125.

The route starts in Astana on the Nur-Sultan bypass junction, where it travels north-west and meets the start of the R6 highway and continues. It ends near the city of Shchuchinsk on the junction with the R7 highway. It restarts in north of Kokshetau next to the A13 highway and finishes its route in Petropavl.

Cities along the A1 (from south to north)
Astana	→ 180 km →	Makinsk	→ 38 km →	Shchuchinsk	→ 74 km →	Kokshetau	→ 227 km →	Petropavl

== History ==
The reconstruction of Astana - Shchuchinsk section started in 2006. It ended 3 years later in 2009.

The toll road on the Astana – Shchuchinsk section was introduced in 2013.

In 2017, the reconstruction of the Kokshetau — Petropavl section was completed.
