= Sladkovsky District =

Sladkovsky District Сладковский район (Russian)
- District
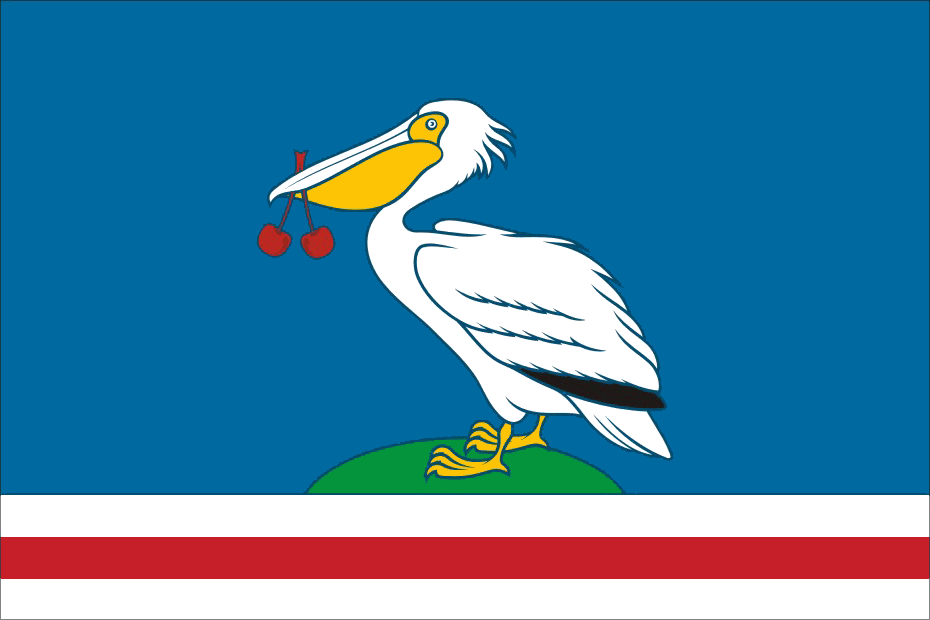
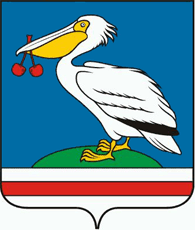
- Flag Coat of arms
- Location of Sladkovsky District in Tyumen Oblast
- Coordinates: 55°31′50″N 70°20′0″E
- Country: Russia
- Federal subject: Tyumen Oblast
- Established: November 12, 1923
- Administrative center: Sladkovo

Government
  - Type: Local government
  - Head of the Administration: Alexander Ivanov

Area
  - Total: 4,023 km^{2} (1,553 sq mi)

Population (2010 Census)
  - Total: 12,264
  - Density: 3.048/km^{2} (7.896/sq mi)
  - Urban: 0%
  - Rural: 100%

Administrative structure
  - Administrative divisions: 10 Rural okrugs
  - Inhabited localities: 46 rural localities

Municipal structure
  - Municipally incorporated as: Sladkovsky Municipal District
  - Municipal divisions: 0 urban settlements, 10 rural settlements
- Time zone: UTC+5 (MSK+2)
- OKTMO ID: 71636000
- Website: http://sladkovo.admtyumen.ru/

Sladkovsky District (Russian: Сладко́вский райо́н) is an administrative district (raion), one of the twenty-two in Tyumen Oblast, Russia. As a municipal division, it is incorporated as Sladkovsky Municipal District. It is located in the southeast of the oblast and borders with Abatsky District in the north, Omsk Oblast in the east, Kazakhstan in the south, Kazansky District in the west, and with Ishimsky District in the northwest. The area of the district is 4,023 square kilometers (1,553 sq mi). Its administrative center is the rural locality (a selo) of Sladkovo. Population: 12,264 (2010 Census); 15,052 (2002 Census); 17,750 (1989 Soviet census). The population of Sladkovo accounts for 26.9% of the district's total population.

== Geography ==
The district is located in the southeastern portion of Tyumen Oblast in the steppe zone. 2,826.73 square kilometers (1,091.41 sq mi) of the district's territory are used for agricultural needs, including 673.28 square kilometers (259.95 sq mi) for ploughland, 752.23 square kilometers (290.44 sq mi) as hayfields, 523.68 square kilometers (202.19 sq mi) as pastures, 794.82 square kilometers (306.88 sq mi) as forests, and 807.92 square kilometers (311.94 sq mi) as water resources.

The district is also known as the place of blue lakes. 108 lakes are located on its territory, with total surface area of 248 square kilometers (96 sq mi). The biggest of them is lake Tavolzhan, with a total surface area of 71 square kilometers (27 sq mi) and a length of over 15 kilometers (9.3 mi). The program encouraging commercial fishing in the lake was initiated in 2007.

== History ==
The district was established on November 12, 1923 within Ishim Okrug of Ural Oblast by merging Rozhdestvenskaya, Sladkovskaya, Usovskaya, and a part of Maslyanskaya Volosts. After a series of administrative transformations, abolitions, and restorations, the district was established in its present form on January 12, 1965 from eleven selsoviets of Maslyansky District of Tyumen Oblast.

== Administration ==
As of 2013, the Head of the District Administration is Alexander Ivanov.

== Agriculture ==
Agriculture plays a leading role in the economy of Sladkovsky District. The main (and equally represented) branches of agriculture are:

- cattle breeding;
- diary and meat production;
- corn and grain legumes production.

== Industry ==
In 2010, 218 million rubles worth of goods were produced in the district, which is 29% more than in 2009. The following goods are produced by the district's factories:

- bread and flour products;
- fish production;
- heat power;
- wood production (wooden doors and window frames);
- asphalt-concrete production.

== Employment ==
The total workforce is 7,200 people, including 6,700 economically active. The employment is distributed as follows:

- 20% in agriculture;
- 16% in education;
- 11% in health and social system.

Unemployment level is low (0.1%).

== Sladkovo wildlife reserve ==
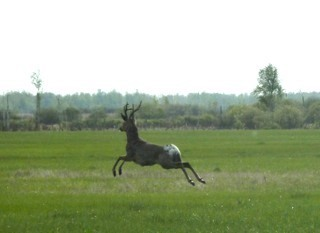
Roe Deer in Sladkovo

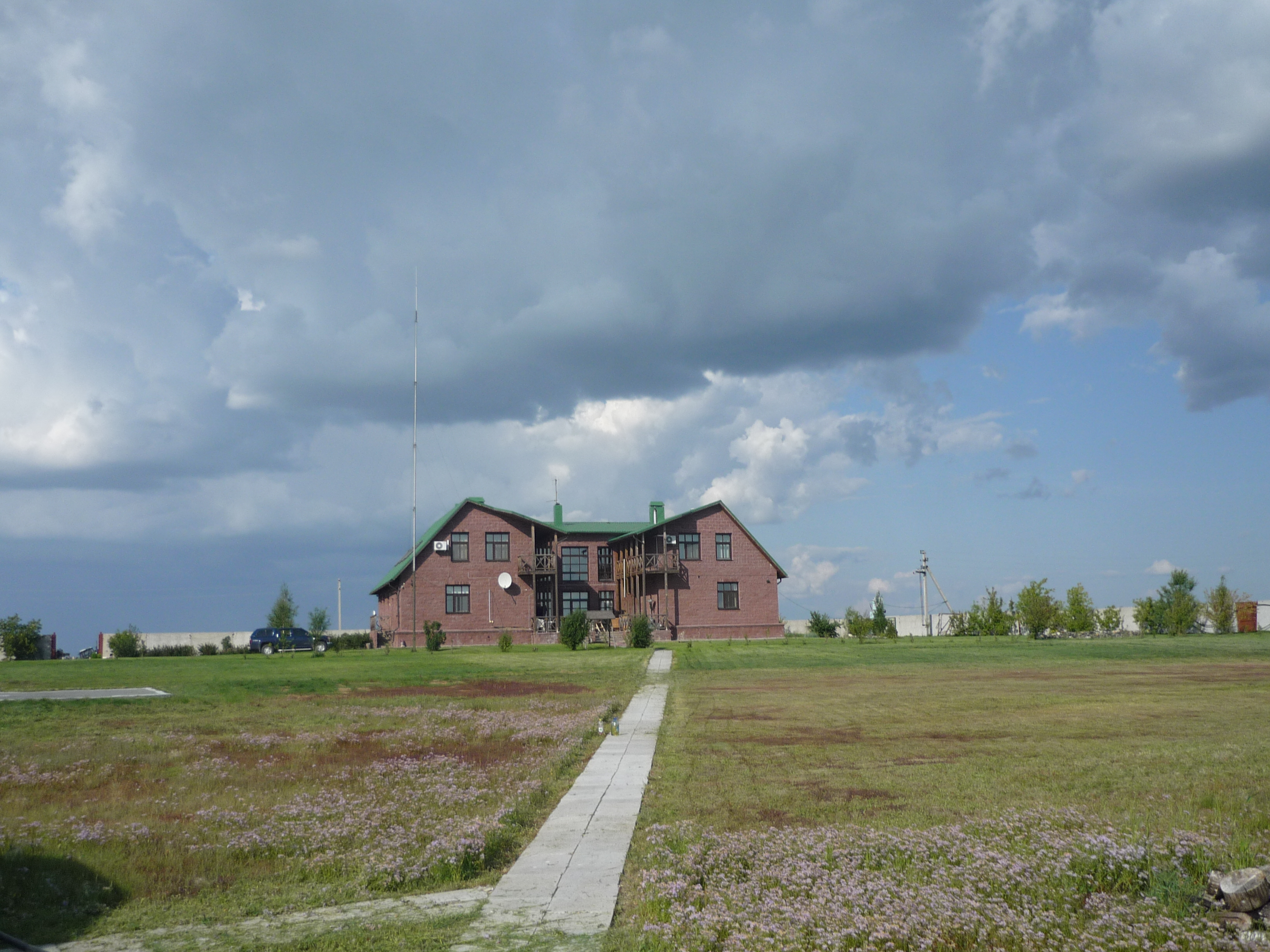
Sladkovo wildlife reserve lodge

Sladkovo wildlife reserve is located 10 kilometers (6.2 mi) west of Sladkovo, the administrative center of the district. Its total area is 1,500 square kilometers (580 sq mi), 300 square kilometers (120 sq mi) of which lie in Sladkovsky District and 740 square kilometers (290 sq mi)—in Nazyvayevsky District of Omsk Oblast.

This reserve is a result of fifteen years of hard work of restoring and preserving wildlife (Siberian Roe Deer, wild boars, marals, moose, and birds).
