= Kazansky District =

Kazansky District Казанский район (Russian)
- District
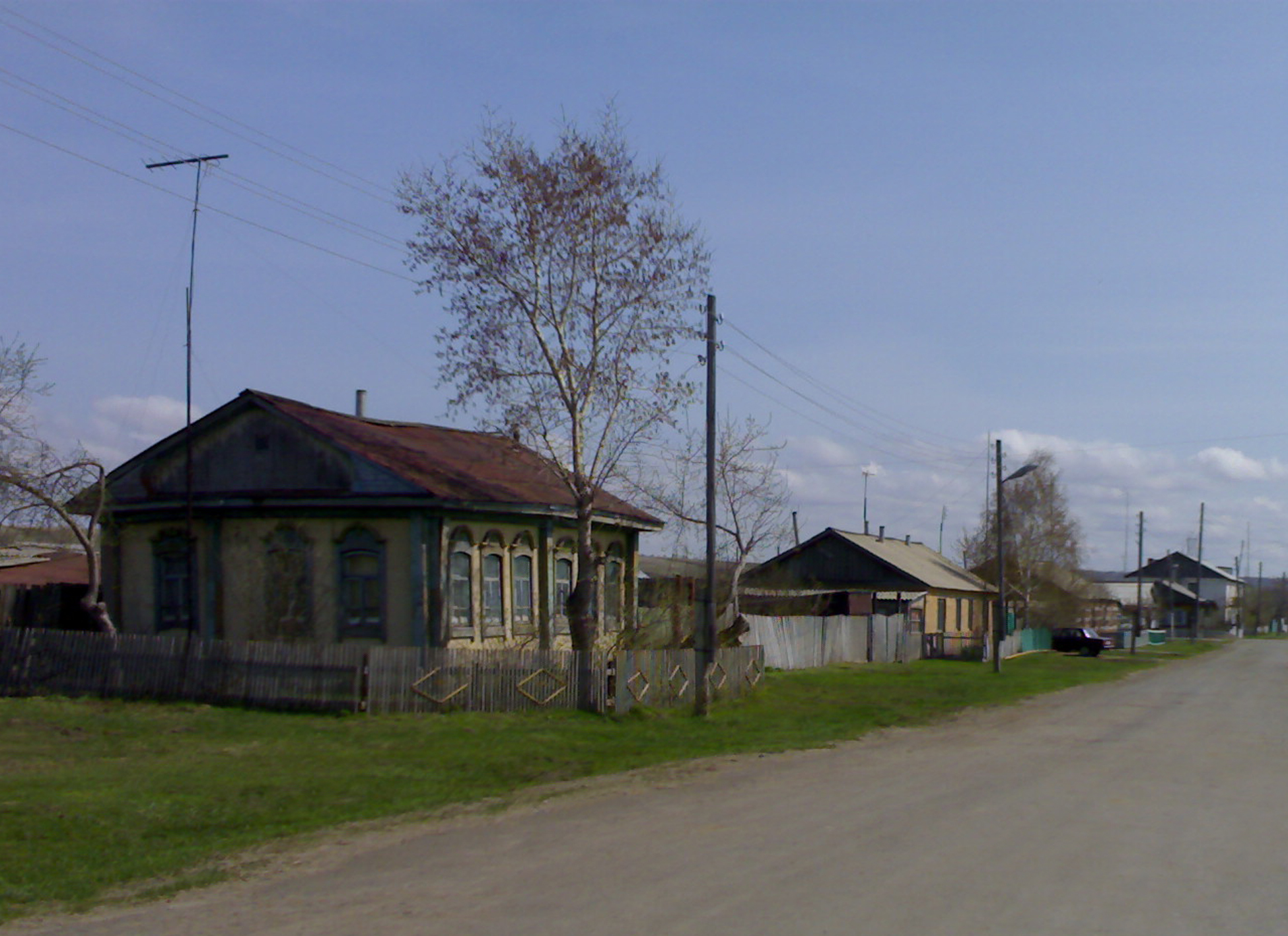
- Village Afonkin, Kazansky District

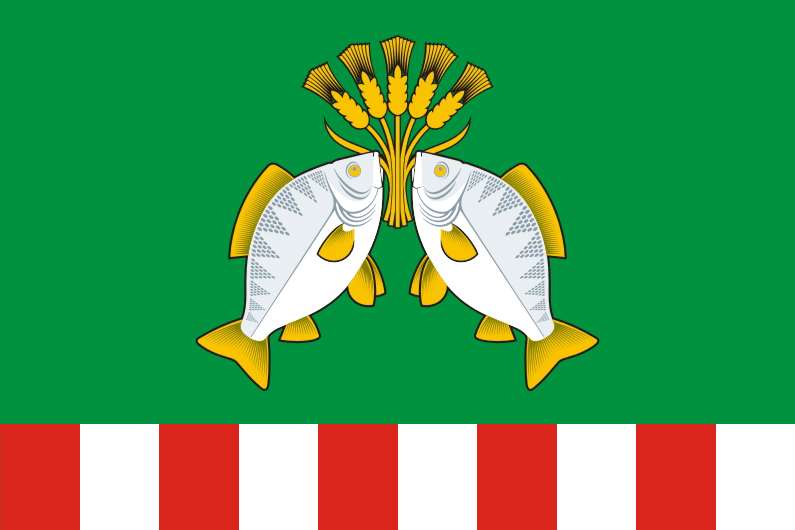
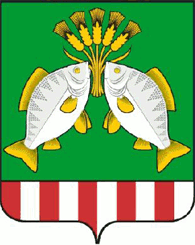
- Flag Coat of arms
- Location of Kazansky District in Tyumen Oblast
- Coordinates: 55°39′18″N 69°13′16″E
- Country: Russia
- Federal subject: Tyumen Oblast
- Established: 10 June 1931
- Administrative center: Kazanskoye

Area
  - Total: 3,094.5 km^{2} (1,194.8 sq mi)

Population (2010 Census)
  - Total: 22,490
  - Density: 7.268/km^{2} (18.82/sq mi)
  - Urban: 0%
  - Rural: 100%

Administrative structure
  - Administrative divisions: 14 Rural okrugs
  - Inhabited localities: 40 rural localities

Municipal structure
  - Municipally incorporated as: Kazansky Municipal District
  - Municipal divisions: 0 urban settlements, 14 rural settlements
- Time zone: UTC+5 (MSK+2)
- OKTMO ID: 71630000
- Website: http://kazanka.admtyumen.ru/

Kazansky District (Russian: Каза́нский райо́н) is an administrative district (raion), one of the twenty-two in Tyumen Oblast, Russia. As a municipal division, it is incorporated as Kazansky Municipal District. It is located in the south of the oblast. The area of the district is 3,094.5 square kilometers (1,194.8 sq mi). Its administrative center is the rural locality (a selo) of Kazanskoye. Population: 22,490 (2010 Census); 23,978 (2002 census); 23,997 (1989 Soviet census). The population of Kazanskoye accounts for 26.4% of the district's total population.

== Geography ==
Kazansky District is located in the south of Tyumen Oblast, on the border with Kazakhstan. The terrain is a rolling plain with a forest-steppe landscape. The Ishim River runs south-to-north through the middle of the district. About 25% of the area is forested, and about 25% is cropland, and another 35% is pasture and other agricultural land. There are 140 lakes in the district, reflecting the flat terrain and low runoff. The administrative center is the town of Kazanskoye. Kazansky District is 280 km southeast of the city of Tyumen, 124 km north of the city of Petropavl, Kazakhstan, and 1,950 km east of Moscow. The nearest train station is 60 km away in Ishim, Tyumen Oblast. The area measures 57 km (north-south), 65 km (west-east); total area is 3,100 km2 (about 0.003% of Tyumen Oblast).

The district is bordered on the north by Ishimsky District, on the east by Sladkovsky District, on the south by Kazakhstan, and on the west by Berdyuzhsky District.

== History ==
The first small settlement of Russians occurred in the mid-1700s. The area at the time was on the frontier, exposed to raids by local nomadic tribes. A military fort was built in the late 1700s, extending the fortified area south. Thereafter, settlements of Russian farmers increased dramatically, drawn by the fertile soil and abundant lakes for fishing.

Kazansky District was officially formed in July 1931.
