= Ishim Steppe =

Plain in Western Siberia

Ishim Steppe Ishim Plain Ишимская равнина Есіл даласы
- Plain
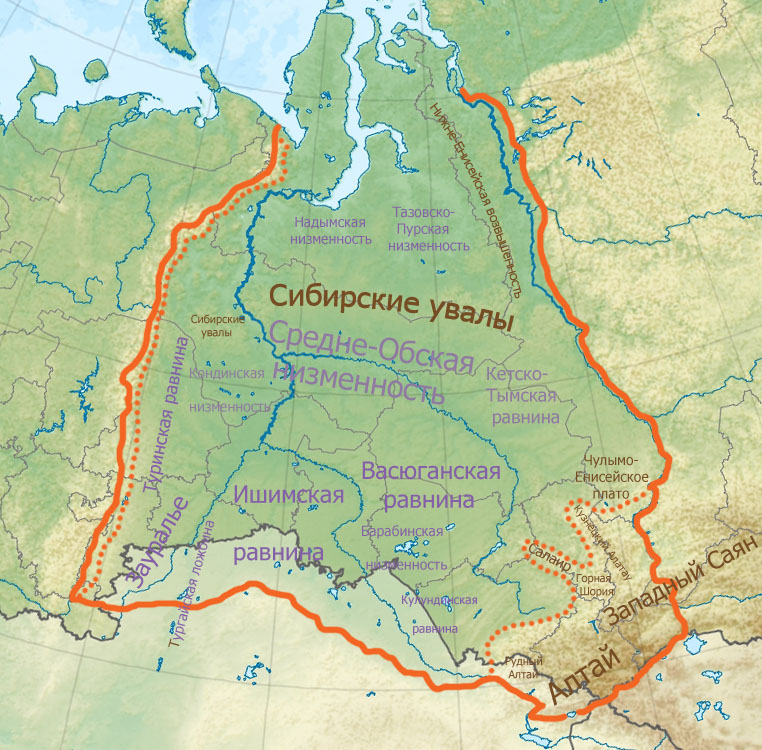
- Map of the West Siberian Plain with the Ishim Steppe in the southern part
- Interactive map of Ishim Steppe
- Coordinates: 56°N 70°E
- Location: Kazakhstan, Russia
- Part of: West Siberian Plain

Area
  - Total: 200,000 km^{2} (77,000 sq mi)
- Elevation: 140 meters (460 ft) to 250 meters (820 ft)

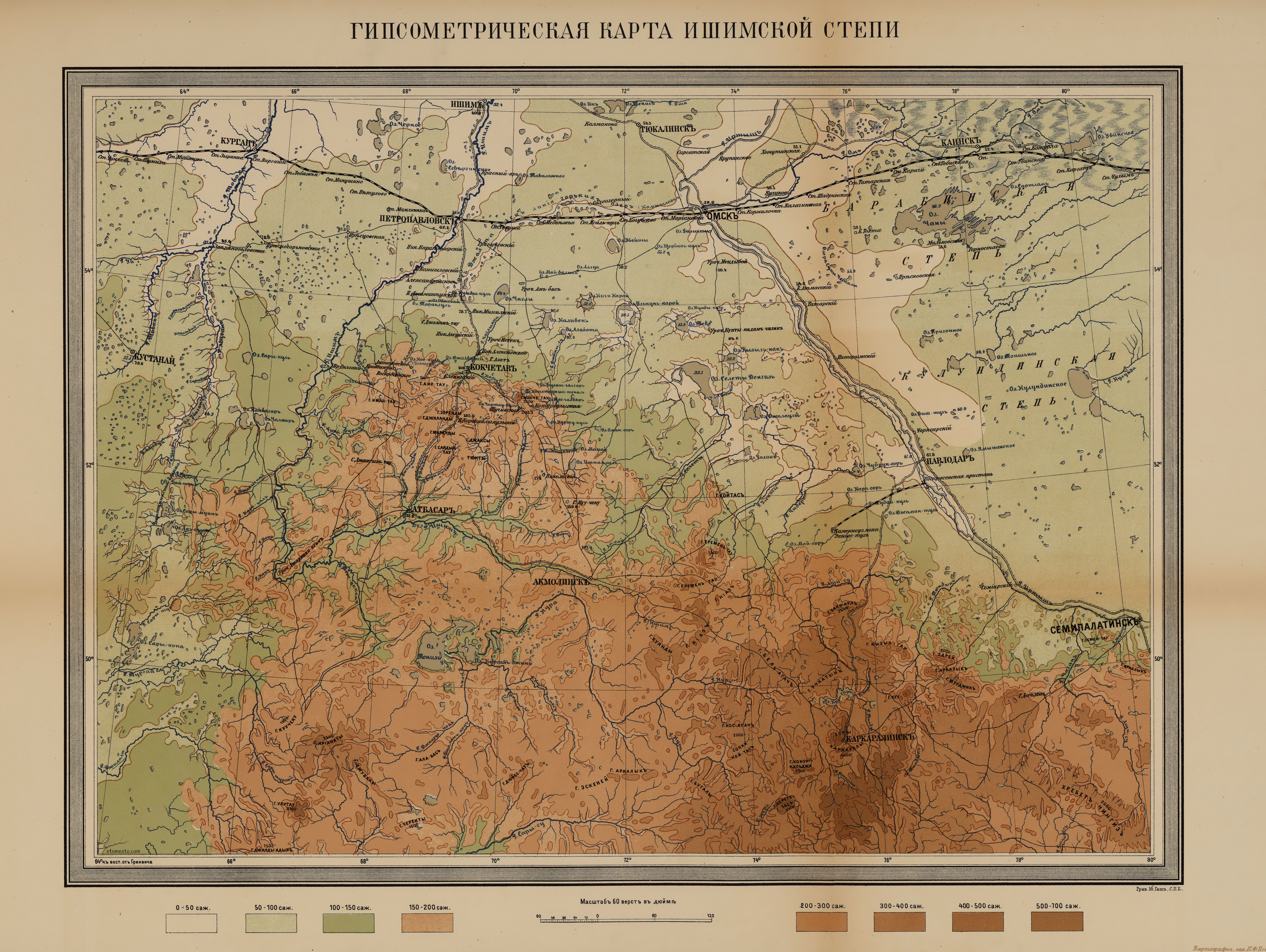
Ishim Steppe

Ishim Steppe (Russian: Ишимская равнина, Kazakh: Есіл даласы, Yesil dalasy) is a plain in the southern part of Western Siberia, between the Irtysh and Tobol rivers. Administratively it is part of Kurgan, Tyumen, and Omsk oblasts in Russia, and the North Kazakhstan Region in Kazakhstan. Ishim steppe borders Baraba steppe to the east.

== Geography ==
The plain includes the Ishim, after which it is named. It varies in altitude from 120 metres (390 ft) to 140 metres (460 ft) and is composed chiefly of sand and clay deposits of the Neocene era, covered with loess-like loams. The terrain is characterized by a series of crests and hollows, with the ridges extending from the northeast to the southwest. The almost 500 kilometers (310 mi) long Kamyshlov Log (Камышловский лог), a trench where lake Bolshoy Tarangul lies, stretches roughly from east to west across the plain.

In the lowlands and valleys there are numerous fresh, bitter, and salt lakes, such as Siletiteniz, Kyzylkak, Medvezhye, Stanovoye, Teke, Ebeyty, Tavolzhan and Shaglyteniz, as well as the Krutinsky Lakes, including lakes Tenis-Saltaim, Sazykul and Ik. The smaller lakes and rivers dry up in the summer.

== Climate ==
The amplitude of average monthly temperatures is between 37 °C (99 °F) and 38 °C (100 °F). Winters are cold and long, the average January temperature ranging between −18 °C (0 °F) and −20 °C (−4 °F), reaching −48 °C (−54 °F) to −52 °C (−62 °F) in periods of severe frosts. The summer season is warm, with the average temperature in July between 18.5 °C (65.3 °F) and 19.5 °C (67.1 °F) and maximums reaching 38 °C (100 °F) to 40 °C (104 °F).

== Flora ==
The landscape of the plain is dominated by meadow steppes and birch forests (kolki). The soil consists in leached and normal chernozem and gray forest topsoils. In the south the plain is entirely under cultivation.
