= West Siberian Plain =

Large plain that occupies the western portion of Siberia

West Siberian Plain Западно-Сибирская равнина
- Plain
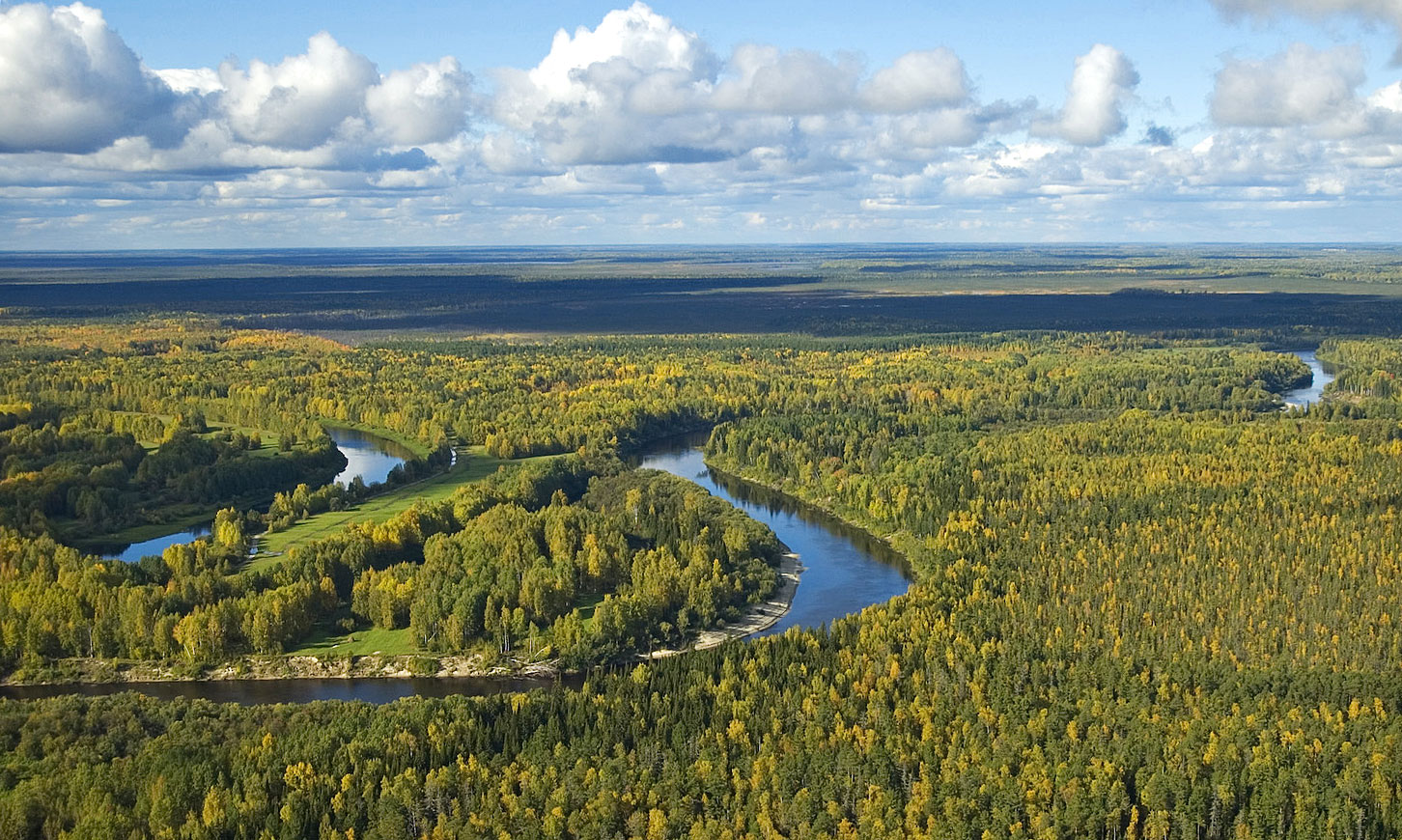
- View of the Vasyugan River

- Location within Russia
- Coordinates: 62°00′N 76°00′E
- Location: Russia; Kazakhstan
- Part of: Siberia

Area
  - Total: 2,600,000 km^{2} (1,000,000 sq mi)

Dimensions
  - Length: 2,500 kilometers (1,600 mi)
  - Width: 1,500 kilometers (930 mi)

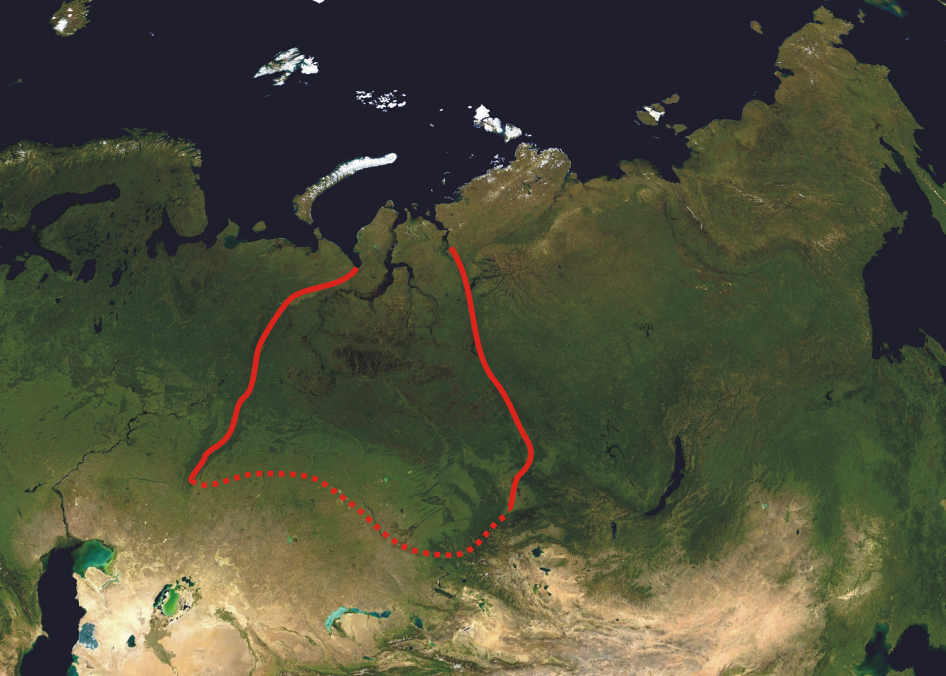
Western Siberian plain on a satellite map of North Asia

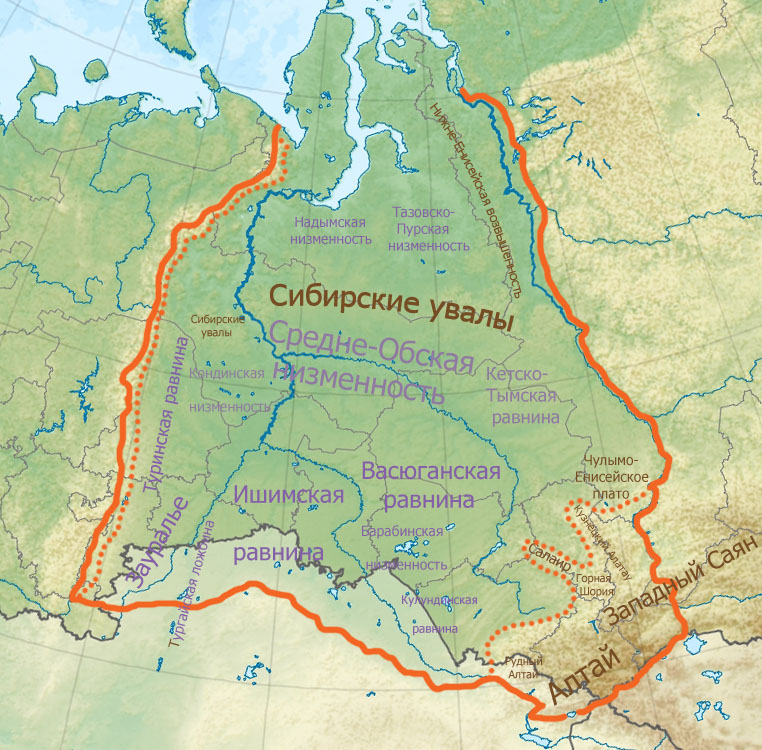
Map of the West Siberian Plain showing its subdivisions

The West Siberian Plain (Russian: Западно-Сибирская равнина, romanized: Zapadno-Sibirskaya ravnina) is a large plain that occupies the western portion of Siberia, between the Ural Mountains in the west and the Yenisei River in the east, and the Altai Mountains on the southeast. Much of the plain is poorly drained and consists of some of the world's largest swamps and floodplains. Important cities include Chelyabinsk, Novosibirsk, Omsk, and Tomsk, as well as Surgut and Nizhnevartovsk.

Winters on the West Siberian Plain are harsh and long. The climate of most of the plain areas is either subarctic or continental. The plain had large petroleum and natural gas reserves. Most of Russia's oil and gas production was extracted from this area during the 1970s and 80s.

== Geography ==
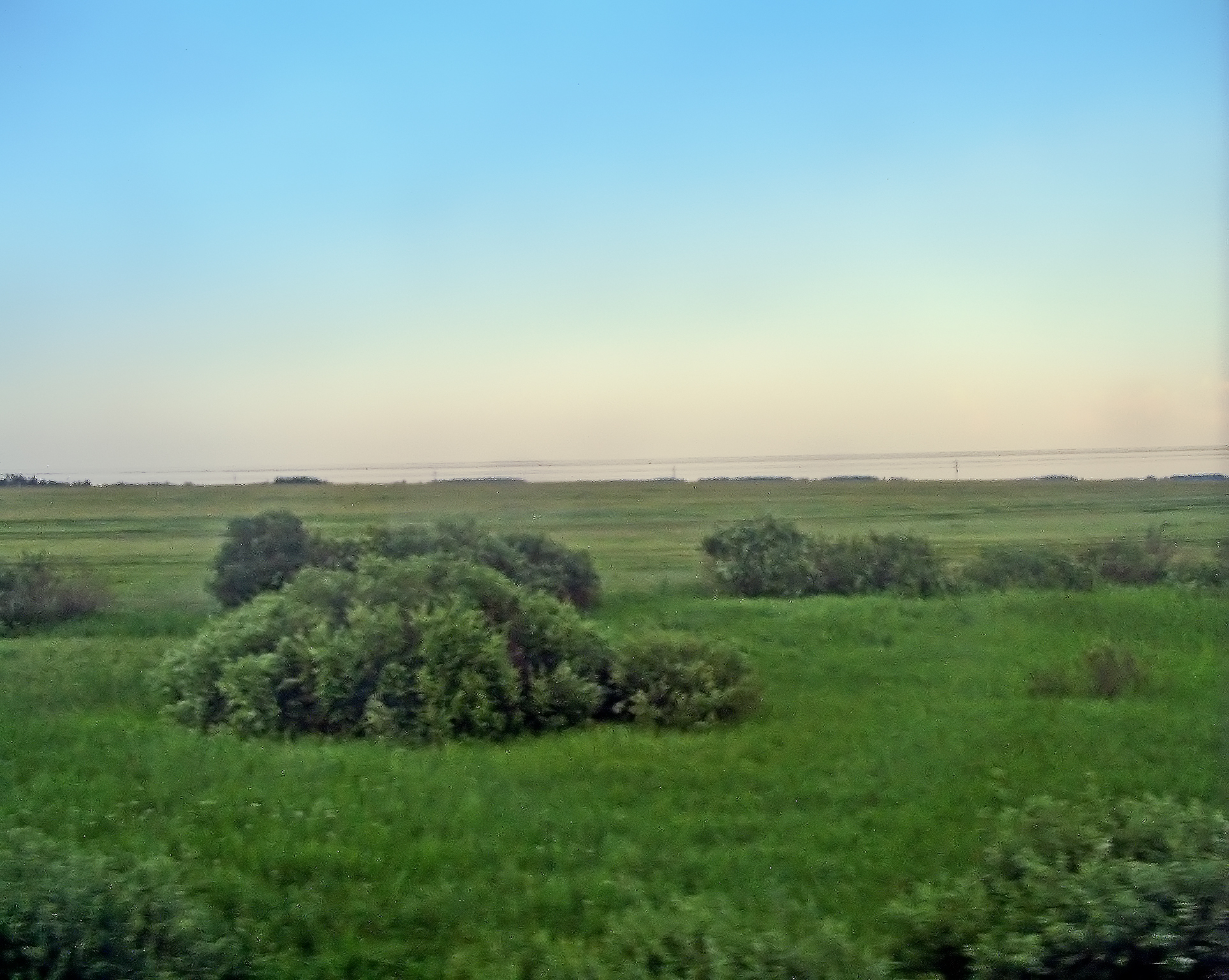
Western Siberian plain seen from the Trans-Siberian Railway outside Tatarskaya

The West Siberian Plain is located east of the Ural Mountains mostly in the territory of Russia. It is one of the Great Russian Regions and has been described as the world's largest unbroken lowland – more than 50 percent is less than 100 m (328 ft) above sea level—and covers an area of about 2.6–2.7 million square kilometres (1.0 million square miles) which is about one third of Siberia. It extends from north to south for 2,500 kilometres (1,600 miles), reaching its maximum width of 1,500 kilometres (930 miles) in its southern part. from the Arctic Ocean to the foothills of the Altai Mountains, and from east to west for 1,900 km (1,181 mi) from the Yenisei River to the Ural Mountains. Besides the Yenisei, other main rivers in the West Siberian Plain are from west to east the Irtysh, Ob, Nadym, Pur and Taz. There are many lakes and swamps and large regions of the plains are flooded in the spring.

The long Yenisei River flows broadly south to north, a distance of 3,530 km (2,193 mi) to the Arctic Ocean, where it discharges more than 20 million litres (5 million gallons) of water per second at its mouth. Together with its tributary Angara, the two rivers flow 5,530 km (3,436 mi). The valley formed by the Yenisei acts as a rough dividing line between the West Siberian Plain and the Central Siberian Plateau. The Siberian Uvaly is a low hilly region stretching from east to west across the plain. Glacial deposits extend as far south as the Ob-Irtysh confluence, forming occasional low hills and ridges, including the Ob Plateau in the south, but otherwise the plain is exceedingly flat and featureless. The Ishim Plain and the Baraba Lowland in the south are important agricultural areas. There are salt lakes in the Kulunda Plain, which extends southwards into Kazakhstan and is limited to the south by the Kokshetau Hills.

The West Siberian Plain is very swampy and soils are mostly peaty Histosols and, in the treeless northern part, Histels. It is one of the world's largest areas of peatlands, which are characterized by raised bogs. The Vasyugan Swamp that covers most of the Vasyugan Plain is one of the world's largest single raised bogs, covers approximately 51,600 square kilometres (19,900 sq mi). There are numerous lakes in the vast interfluve swamps of the Ob-Taz floodplain.

== Flora and fauna ==
The plain has eight distinct vegetation regions: tundra, forest-tundra, northern taiga, middle taiga, southern taiga, sub-taiga forest, forest-steppe, and steppe. The number of animal species in the West Siberian Plain ranges from at least 107 in the tundra to 278 or more in the forest-steppe region. In the south of the plain, where permafrost is largely absent, rich grasslands that are an extension of the Kazakh Steppe formed the original vegetation, which had almost all been cleared by the early 21st century.

== Geology ==
The West Siberian Plain consists mostly of Cenozoic alluvial deposits and is extraordinarily flat. A rise of fifty metres in sea level would cause all land between the Arctic Ocean and the Ob-Irtysh confluence near Khanty-Mansiysk to be inundated (see also Turgai Straits, West Siberian Glacial Lake). It is a region of the Earth's crust that has undergone prolonged subsidence and is composed of horizontal deposits from as much as 65 million years ago. Many of the deposits on this plain result from ice dams that reversed the flow of the Ob and Yenisei rivers, redirecting them into the Caspian Sea, and perhaps the Aral Sea as well.

== See also ==
- East European Plain, the other major plain of Russia
- Eurasian steppe
- South Siberian Mountains
- West Siberian petroleum basin
