= Sholaksor =

Lake in Kazakhstan

- Шолақсор
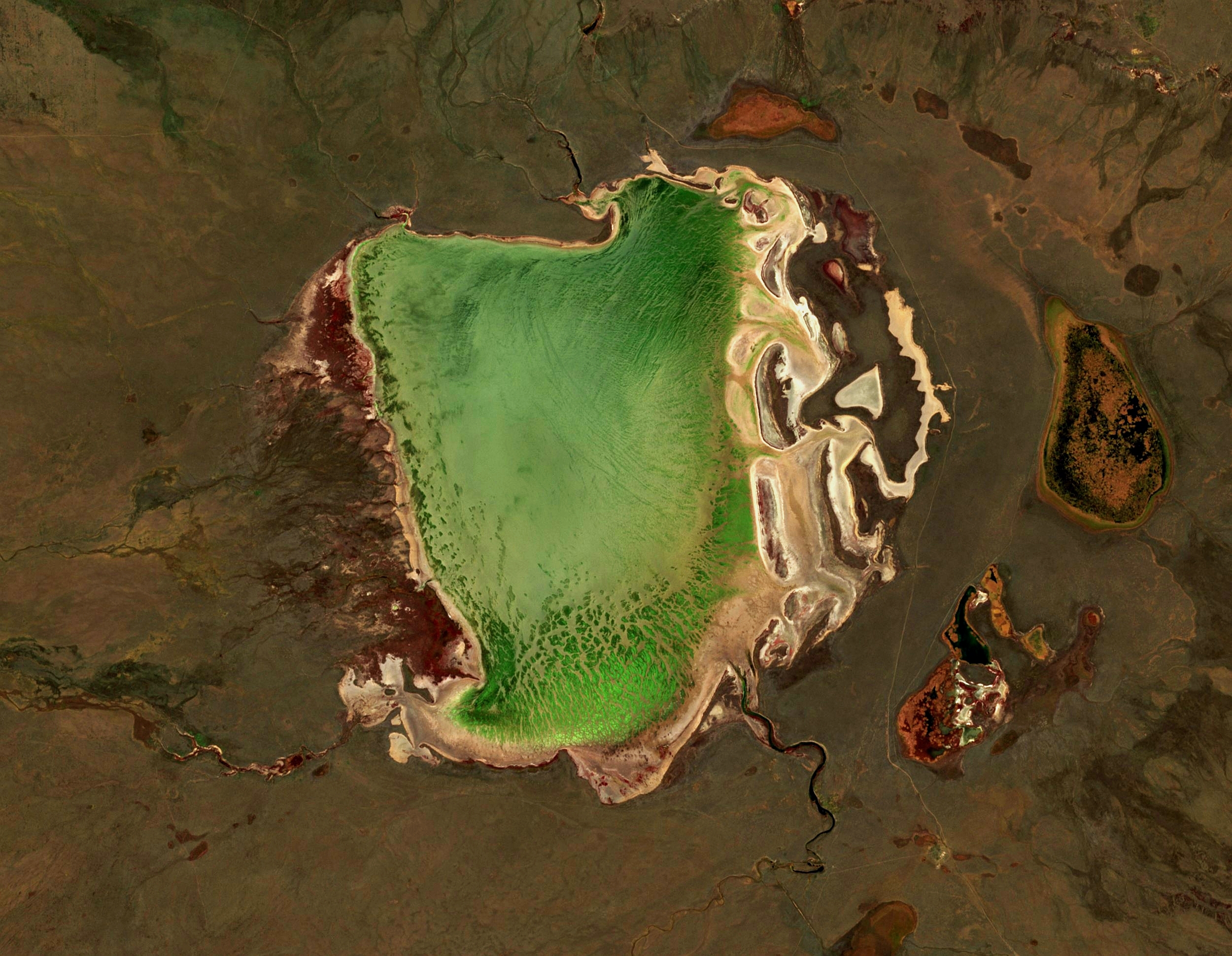
- Sentinel-2 picture of the lake

- Location within Kazakhstan
- Location: Ishim Plain
- Coordinates: 52°28′57″N 74°01′52″E
- Type: endorheic lake
- Primary inflows: Teneke
- Basin countries: Kazakhstan
- Max. length: 7.9 kilometers (4.9 mi)
- Max. width: 4.6 kilometers (2.9 mi)
- Surface area: 28.26 square kilometers (10.91 sq mi)
- Residence time: UTC+6:00
- Surface elevation: 65.6 meters (215 ft)

Sholaksor (Kazakh: Шолақсор; Russian: Шолаксор) is a salt lake in the Yereymentau District, Akmola Region, and Aktogay District, Pavlodar Region, Kazakhstan.

The lake lies 127 kilometers (79 mi) to the southwest of district capital Aktogay. The border between the two regions runs from north to south close to the western lakeshore, with Akmola Region to the west, and most of the lake in Pavlodar to the east. The area surrounding Sholaksor is used for livestock grazing. The lake water is salty.

== Geography ==
Sholaksor is an endorheic lake of the Ishim Plain, at the southern end of the West Siberian Plain. It is located between the Shiderti and Sileti rivers. The lake lies at an elevation of 65 meters (213 ft). The Irtysh flows 130 kilometers (81 mi) to the northeast of the lake.

Sholaksor has a roughly rectangular shape. Some stretches of the shore are rocky, but it is mostly flat and low, with salt flats. The eastern shoreline is irregular and very indented. The Teneke flows into the southwestern end of the lake and another river flows in at the southeastern end. Sholaksor fills in spring when the snows of the surrounding basin melt. It freezes at the end of November and thaws before the end of April. In years of drought the lake may dry completely, turning into a sor

There are a number of other lakes in its vicinity, such as Shyganak 22 kilometers (14 mi) to the northeast, Zhalauly 32 kilometers (20 mi) to the north, Siletiteniz 70 kilometers (43 mi) to the NNW, Karakaska 75 kilometers (47 mi) to the northeast, Shandaksor 100 kilometers (62 mi) to the southeast and Shureksor 115 kilometers (71 mi) to the ESE.

== See also ==
- List of lakes of Kazakhstan
