= Karakaska =

Lake in Kazakhstan

- Қарақасқа
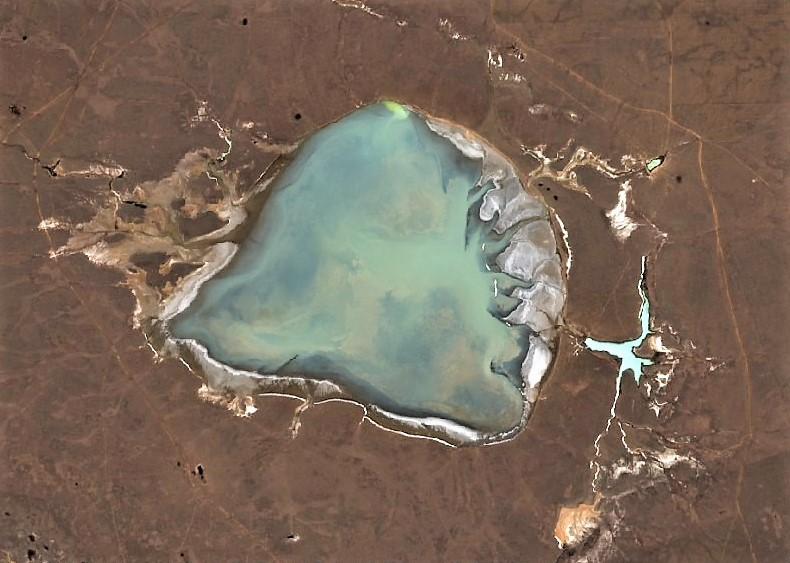
- Sentinel-2 picture of the lake

- Location within Kazakhstan
- Location: Ishim Plain
- Coordinates: 52°44′15″N 75°08′18″E
- Type: endorheic lake
- Catchment area: 205 square kilometers (79 sq mi)
- Basin countries: Kazakhstan
- Max. length: 4.5 kilometers (2.8 mi)
- Max. width: 4 kilometers (2.5 mi)
- Surface area: 11.6 square kilometers (4.5 sq mi)
- Residence time: UTC+6:00
- Shore length^{1}: 13 kilometers (8.1 mi)
- Surface elevation: 93.2 meters (306 ft)
- Islands: no
- ^{1} Shore length is not a well-defined measure.

Karakaska (Kazakh: Қарақасқа; Russian: Каракаска) is a salt lake in the Aktogay District, Pavlodar Region, Kazakhstan.

The lake lies 54 kilometers (34 mi) to the southwest of Aktogay, the district capital. The area surrounding the lake is used for livestock grazing.

== Geography ==
Karakaska is an endorheic lake of the Ishim Plain, at the southern end of the West Siberian Plain. It is part of the Irtysh river basin. The lake lies at an elevation of 93 meters (305 ft). The Irtysh flows 56 kilometers (35 mi) to the northeast of the lake.

Karakaska has a roughly triangular shape. Most of the shore is flat and low, but stretches of the northern and southern parts are rocky, with 4 meters (13 ft) to 5 meters (16 ft) high cliffs. The lake usually dries in the summer, turning pink before drying out.

There are a number of other lakes in its vicinity, such as Taikonyr 33 kilometers (21 mi) to the east, Shyganak 49 kilometers (30 mi) to the west, Zhalauly 65 kilometers (40 mi) to the WNW, Sholaksor 75 kilometers (47 mi) to the southwest, and Zhamantuz 22 kilometers (14 mi) to the NNE. 6 kilometers (3.7 mi) to the southwest lies a cluster of four smaller lakes: Karkaraly, Koybagar, Bastuz and an unnamed one.

== Flora and fauna ==
Karakaska is surrounded by steppe vegetation. It is known as a "dead lake" (Kazakh: тұйық көл) in Kazakh. No fish live in its waters. The water of the lake is not suitable for watering cattle.

== See also ==
- List of lakes of Kazakhstan
