= Taikonyr =

Lake in Kazakhstan

- Тайқоңыр
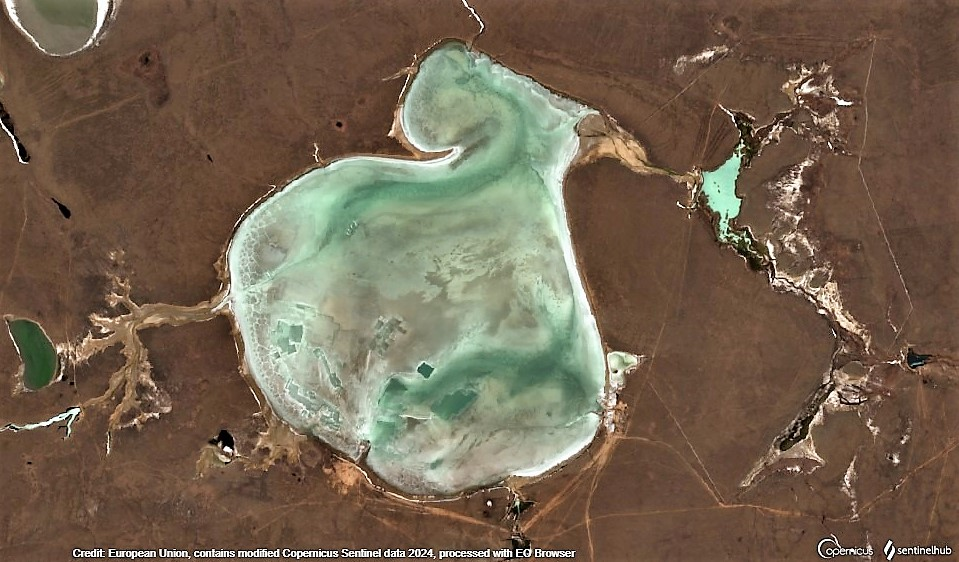
- Sentinel-2 picture of the lake in April.

- Location within Kazakhstan
- Location: Ishim Plain
- Coordinates: 52°41′42″N 75°41′09″E
- Type: endorheic lake
- Catchment area: 117 square kilometers (45 sq mi)
- Basin countries: Kazakhstan
- Max. length: 6.5 kilometers (4.0 mi)
- Max. width: 3.7 kilometers (2.3 mi)
- Surface area: 14.9 square kilometers (5.8 sq mi)
- Residence time: UTC+6:00
- Shore length^{1}: 20.2 kilometers (12.6 mi)
- Surface elevation: 87 meters (285 ft)
- Islands: no
- ^{1} Shore length is not a well-defined measure.

Taikonyr (Kazakh: Тайқоңыр; Russian: Тайконур) is a salt lake in the Aktogay District, Pavlodar Region, Kazakhstan.

The lake lies 37 kilometers (23 mi) to the SSW of Aktogay, the district capital, and 45 kilometers (28 mi) to the west of Zhanatap village. Taikonyr has economic importance, there is commercial extraction of salt at the lake. Part of the salt is exported to the Russian Federation.

== Geography ==
Taikonyr is an endorheic lake of the Ishim Plain, at the southern end of the West Siberian Plain. It is part of the Irtysh river basin. The lake lies at an elevation of 87 meters (285 ft). The Irtysh flows 45 kilometers (28 mi) to the northeast of the lake.

Taikonyr is roughly hourglass shaped. Its shore is flat with some parts cut by ravines. The lake dries in the summer, turning pink before drying out.

Zhalpaksor, its nearest neighbor, lies only 2.7 kilometers (1.7 mi) to the west. During spring floods its water overflows into Taikonyr through a shallow channel. There are a number of other lakes in the vicinity, such as Karakaska 33 kilometers (21 mi) to the west, Shureksor 35 kilometers (22 mi) to the south, and Zhamantuz 29 kilometers (18 mi) to the northwest.

== Flora and fauna ==
Taikonyr is surrounded by steppe vegetation. The area near the lake is used for livestock grazing.

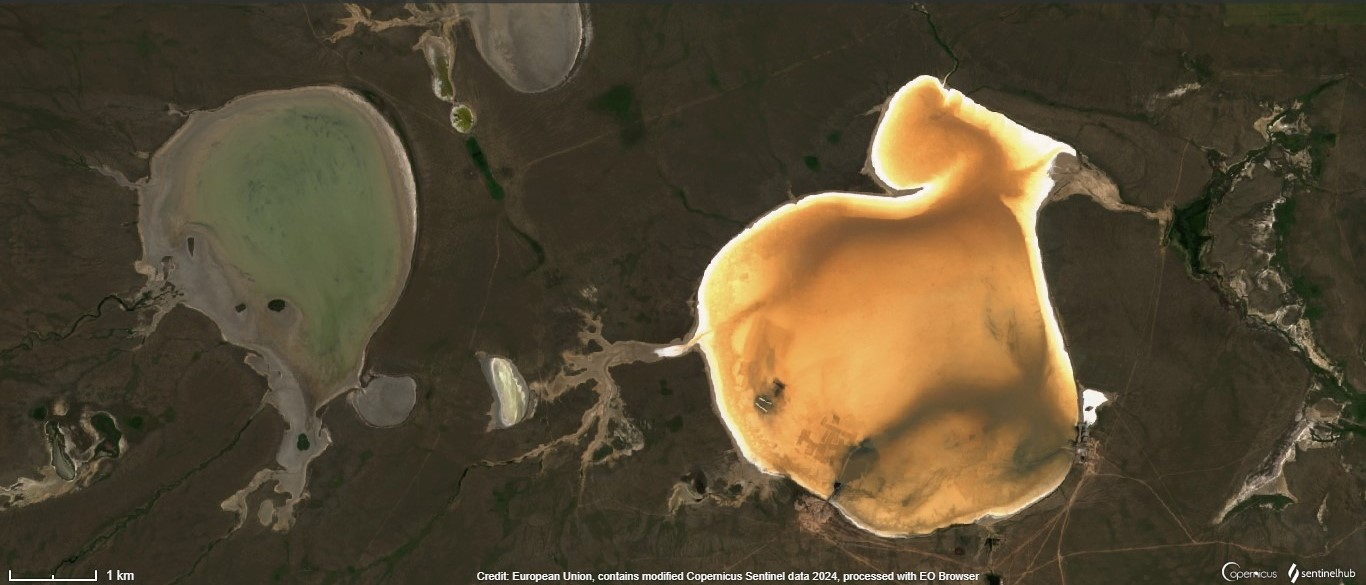
Sentinel-2 picture of the lake with its western neighbor Zhalpaksor.

== See also ==
- List of lakes of Kazakhstan
