= Koksengirsor =

Lake in Kazakhstan

- Көксеңгірсор
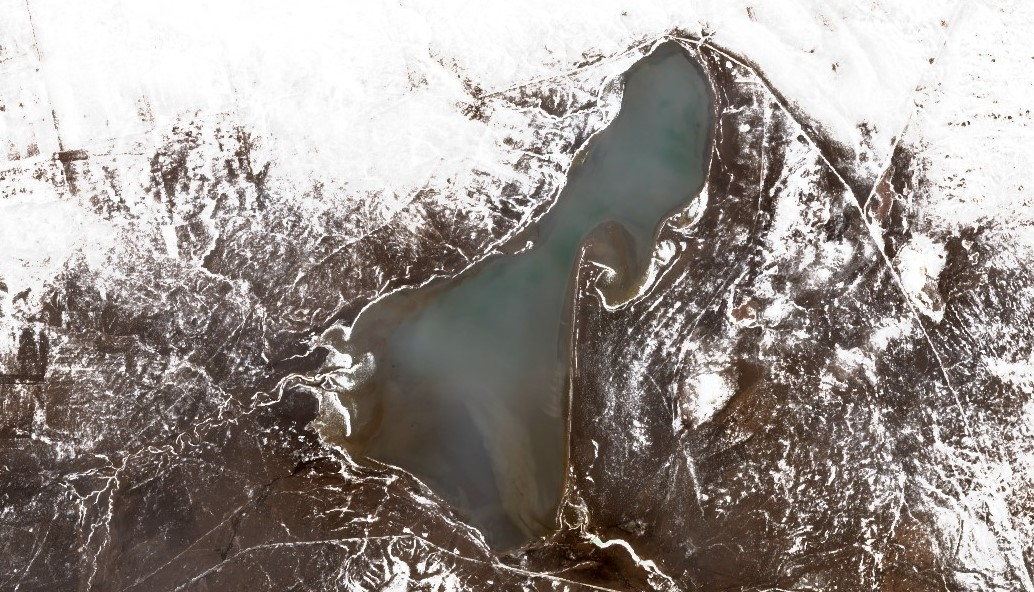
- Sentinel-2 picture of the lake

- Location within Kazakhstan
- Location: Ishim Plain
- Coordinates: 53°02′02″N 71°45′14″E
- Type: endorheic lake
- Primary inflows: Saga and Karasu
- Primary outflows: none
- Basin countries: Kazakhstan
- Max. length: 12.4 kilometers (7.7 mi)
- Max. width: 7.2 kilometers (4.5 mi)
- Surface area: 46.3 square kilometers (17.9 sq mi)
- Average depth: 0.7 meters (2 ft 4 in)
- Residence time: UTC+6:00
- Shore length^{1}: 45.1 kilometers (28.0 mi)
- Surface elevation: 158.8 meters (521 ft)
- Islands: three
- ^{1} Shore length is not a well-defined measure.

Koksengirsor (Kazakh: Көксеңгірсор; Russian: Коксенгирсор) is a salt lake in the Ualikhanov District, North Kazakhstan Region, Kazakhstan.

The lake lies 11 kilometers (6.8 mi) to the WNW of Zolotaya Niva village. The border with Akmola Region runs close to the southern end of the lake. Koksengirsor has local economic importance.

== Geography ==
Koksengirsor is an endorheic lake part of the Ishim river basin. It lies at an elevation of 158 meters (518 ft). It is oriented from NE to SW and is elongated, roughly hourglass shaped. The southern part is shallower than the northern one and the eastern shore of the lake is steep.

The Saga river flows from the west into the western shore and the Karasu from the southeast into the southern end of Koksengirsor. The lake usually freezes in November and stays under ice until March. Lake Atansor is located 27 kilometers (17 mi) to the SSW. The western end of larger lake Siletiteniz lies 85 kilometers (53 mi) to the ENE and Ulken Karoy 80 kilometers (50 mi) to the north.

== See also ==
- List of lakes of Kazakhstan
