= Shyganak =

Lake in Kazakhstan

- Шығанақ / Шаганак
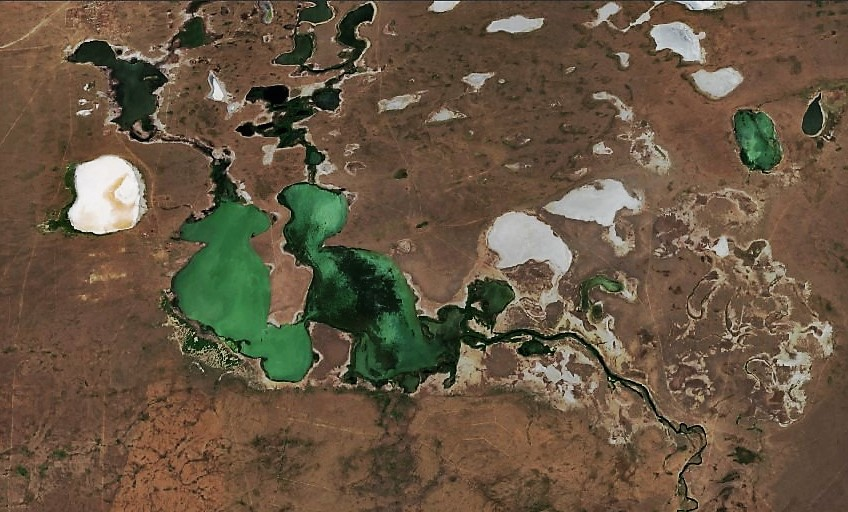
- Sentinel-2 image of the lake in 2022

- Location within Kazakhstan
- Location: Ishim Plain; West Siberian Plain
- Coordinates: 52°39′N 74°21′E
- Type: endorheic
- Primary inflows: Shiderti (Karasu)
- Basin countries: Kazakhstan
- Max. length: 8.7 kilometers (5.4 mi)
- Max. width: 2.3 kilometers (1.4 mi)
- Surface area: 14.3 square kilometers (5.5 sq mi)
- Shore length^{1}: 43.4 kilometers (27.0 mi)
- Surface elevation: 84.8 meters (278 ft)
- ^{1} Shore length is not a well-defined measure.

Shyganak or Shaganak (Kazakh: Шығанақ; Russian: Шаганак), is a salt lake in Aktogay District, Pavlodar Region, Kazakhstan.

The lake is located about 100 kilometers (62 mi) to the WSW of Aktogay, the district capital.

== Geography ==
Shyganak is an endorheic lake lying at the southern end of the Ishim Plain. The lake is located about 15 kilometers (9.3 mi) southeast of lake Zhalauly and 49 kilometers (30 mi) to the west of Karakaska. Other smaller salt lakes and salt marshes surround it. Shyganak has an irregular shape, its shores are flat, swampy in the southern part. Shyganak freezes in early November and thaws in late April.

The Shiderti river flows into the lake from the southeast. In its last section the river is named Karasu. In years of exceptional snowfall, the waters of the Shiderti (Karasu) may fill the whole lake basin, flow out of Shyganak and reach larger lake Zhalauli to the north, but only very rarely. Lake Sholaksor lies 22 kilometers (14 mi) to the southwest.

== See also ==
- List of lakes of Kazakhstan
