= Zolotaya Niva (Ualikhanov District) =

Village in northern Kazakhstan

Zolotaya Niva Золотая Нива
- Location within Kazakhstan
- Coordinates: 52°57′49″N 71°56′35″E
- Country: Kazakhstan
- Regione: North Kazakhstan Region
- District: Ualikhanov District
- Rural District: Karasu Rural District

Population (2009)
  - Total: 155
- Postcode: 151207

Zolotaya Niva (Kazakh: Золотая Нива) is a village in Ualikhanov District, North Kazakhstan Region, Kazakhstan. It is part of the Karasu Rural District (KATO code - 596443580). Population: 155 (2009 census results); 420 (1999 census results).

In Zolotaya Niva, a substantial share of the population depends on agricultural and pastoral activities for their livelihood.

== Geography ==
Zolotaya Niva lies 78 kilometers (48 mi) southwest of Kishkenekol, the district capital, and 11 kilometers (6.8 mi) southeast of lake Koksengirsor.
