= Zhamantuz, Ualikhanov District =

Lake in Kazakhstan

Zhamantuz
- Жамантұз
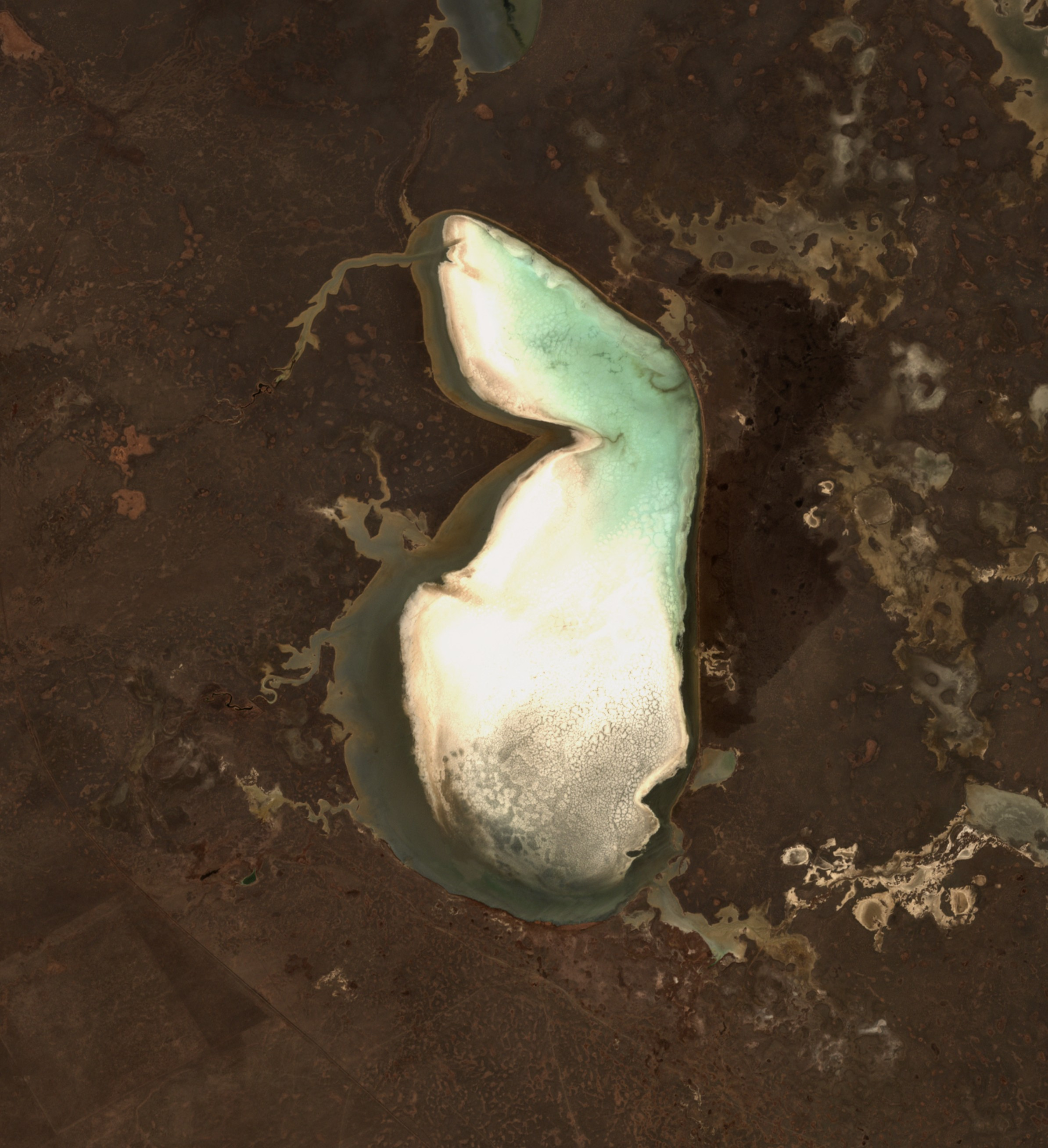
- Sentinel-2 picture of the lake

- Location within Kazakhstan
- Location: Ishim Plain
- Coordinates: 52°58′09″N 73°07′47″E
- Type: endorheic lake
- Primary inflows: Semizbay
- Primary outflows: none
- Basin countries: Kazakhstan
- Max. length: 9.9 kilometers (6.2 mi)
- Max. width: 4.8 kilometers (3.0 mi)
- Surface area: 29.8 square kilometers (11.5 sq mi)
- Residence time: UTC+6:00
- Shore length^{1}: 26.8 kilometers (16.7 mi)
- Surface elevation: 65.9 meters (216 ft)
- Islands: none
- ^{1} Shore length is not a well-defined measure.

Zhamantuz (Kazakh: Жамантұз) is a salt lake in the Ualikhanov District, North Kazakhstan Region, Kazakhstan.

The lake lies 6 kilometers (3.7 mi) to the east of Balkabek, an abandoned village. The Pavlodar Region border lies 25 kilometers (16 mi) to the east of the eastern lakeshore. The area surrounding lake Zhamantuz is used for livestock grazing.

== Geography ==
Zhamantuz is an endorheic lake part of the Sileti river basin. It lies at an elevation of 65.9 meters (216 ft). A broad headland extends eastwards in the northern half of the western shore. The Sileti flows 25 kilometers (16 mi) to the east of the lake.

The 40 kilometers (25 mi) long Semizbay river flows from the west into the western shore. Lake Zhamantuz freezes in November and stays under ice until April. The southern end of larger lake Siletiteniz lies 13 kilometers (8.1 mi) to the northeast, and lake Zhaksytuz 24 kilometers (15 mi) to the SSE.

== See also ==
- List of lakes of Kazakhstan
