= Aktogay District =

Aktogay District may also refer to:

- Aktogay District, Pavlodar Region, a district of Pavlodar Region in Kazakhstan
- Aktogay District, Karaganda Region, a district of Karaganda region in Kazakhstan
