= Zhamantuz, Aktogay District =

Lake in Kazakhstan

Zhamantuz
- Жамантұз
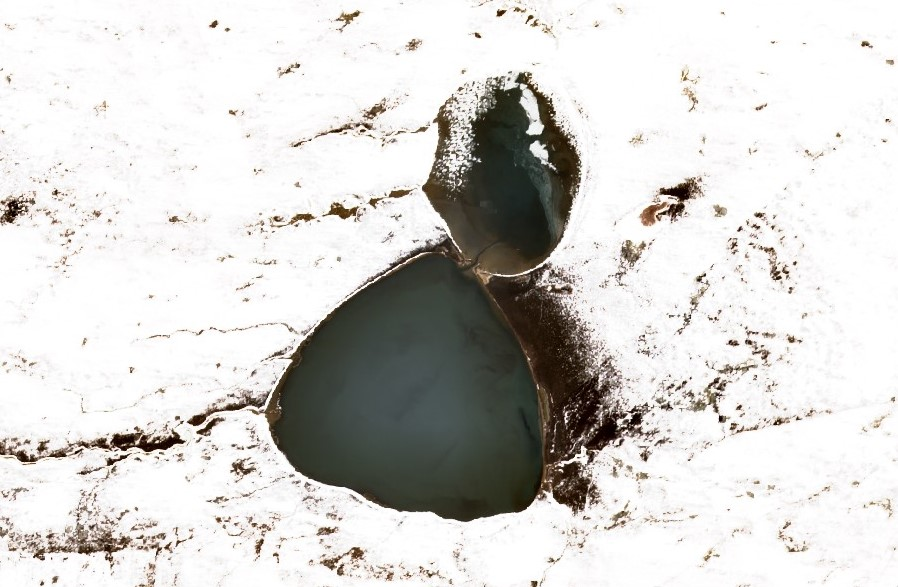
- Sentinel-2 picture of the lake

- Location within Kazakhstan
- Location: Ishim Plain
- Coordinates: 52°56′07″N 75°22′17″E
- Type: endorheic lake
- Basin countries: Kazakhstan
- Max. length: 5.3 kilometers (3.3 mi)
- Max. width: 3.2 kilometers (2.0 mi)
- Surface area: 9.3 square kilometers (3.6 sq mi)
- Residence time: UTC+6:00
- Shore length^{1}: 15.4 kilometers (9.6 mi)
- Surface elevation: 110 meters (360 ft)
- Islands: no
- ^{1} Shore length is not a well-defined measure.

Zhamantuz (Kazakh: Жамантұз) is a salt lake in the Aktogay District, Pavlodar Region, Kazakhstan.

The lake lies 20 kilometers (12 mi) to the east of Barlybai village. The area surrounding Zhamantuz is used for livestock grazing.

== Geography ==
Zhamantuz is an endorheic lake of the Ishim Plain, at the southern end of the West Siberian Plain. It is part of the Irtysh river basin. The lake lies at an elevation of 110 meters (360 ft). The Irtysh flows 33 kilometers (21 mi) to the northeast of the lake.

Zhamantuz has a roughly hourglass shape, with a smaller northern part connected to the southern through a narrow sound. The lake freezes in late November and stays under ice until the second half of March. It usually dries in the summer. There are a number of other lakes in its vicinity, such as Koserin 5 kilometers (3.1 mi) to the east, Aralsor 9 kilometers (5.6 mi) to the NNW, Karakaska 22 kilometers (14 mi) to the WSW, and Taikonyr 29 kilometers (18 mi) to the southeast. 72 kilometers (45 mi) to the SSW lies larger lake Zhalauly.

== Flora and fauna ==
Zhamantuz is known as a "dead lake" (Kazakh: тұйық көл) in Kazakh. Reeds grow in stretches of the shore. The lake is used for watering cattle in the spring.

== See also ==
- List of lakes of Kazakhstan
