= Teke (lake) =

Lake in Kazakhstan

- Теке
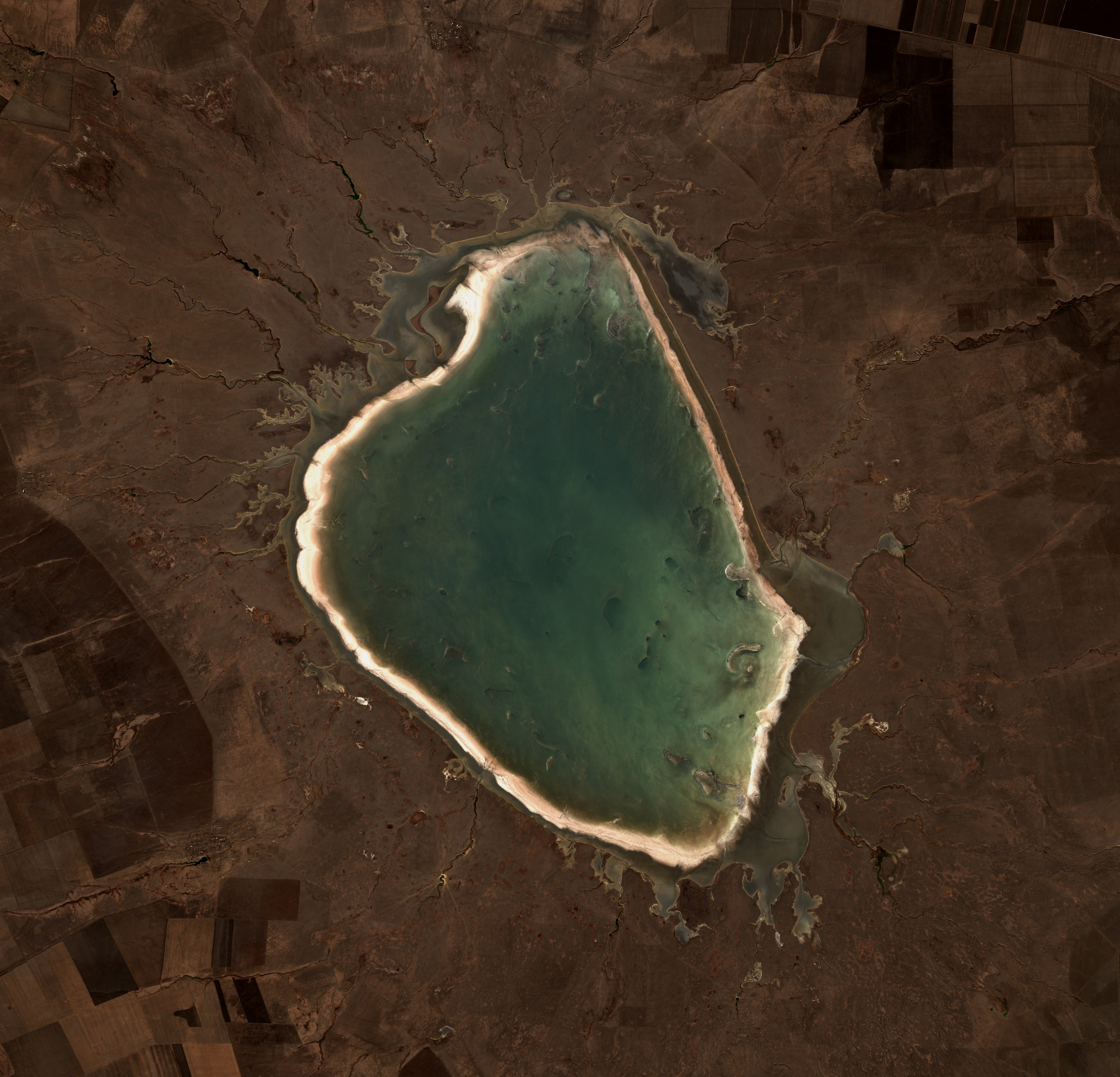
- Sentinel-2 image of the lake in 2020

- Location within Kazakhstan
- Location: Ishim Plain; West Siberian Plain
- Coordinates: 53°50′N 72°56′E
- Type: endorheic
- Primary inflows: Taldysay and Tleusai
- Catchment area: 4,240 square kilometers (1,640 sq mi)
- Basin countries: Kazakhstan
- Max. length: 33 kilometers (21 mi)
- Max. width: 20 kilometers (12 mi)
- Surface area: 265 square kilometers (102 sq mi)
- Average depth: 0.5 meters (1 ft 8 in)
- Max. depth: 1 meter (3 ft 3 in)
- Surface elevation: 29 meters (95 ft)

Teke (Kazakh: Теке; Russian: Теке) is a bittern salt lake in Ualikhanov District, North Kazakhstan Region, Kazakhstan.

The lake lies 36 kilometers (22 mi) to the north of the northern end of larger Siletiteniz lake. 40 kilometers (25 mi) to the west lies lake Ulken-Karoy. There are periodic deposits of salt on its shores, with extraction taking place in the summer. The salt of the lake contains magnesium chloride.

== Geography ==
Teke is an endorheic lake located at the bottom of a depression in the southern part of the Ishim Plain, south of the Russian border. Its shores are partly indented as well as very steep, with 6 meters (20 ft) high cliffs in some places, as well as islets off the shore. The lake is fed by snow, as well as groundwater. Lake Teke is surrounded by salt flats and a wide strip of solonchak soil.

The Taldysay and Tleusai are the main rivers flowing into the lake.

== Flora and fauna ==
The west bank of Teke lake is visited yearly by large flocks of demoiselle cranes and Eurasian cranes during their autumn migration.

== See also ==
- List of lakes of Kazakhstan
