= Kyzylkak =

Lake in the country of Kazakhstan

- Қызылқақ / Кызылкак
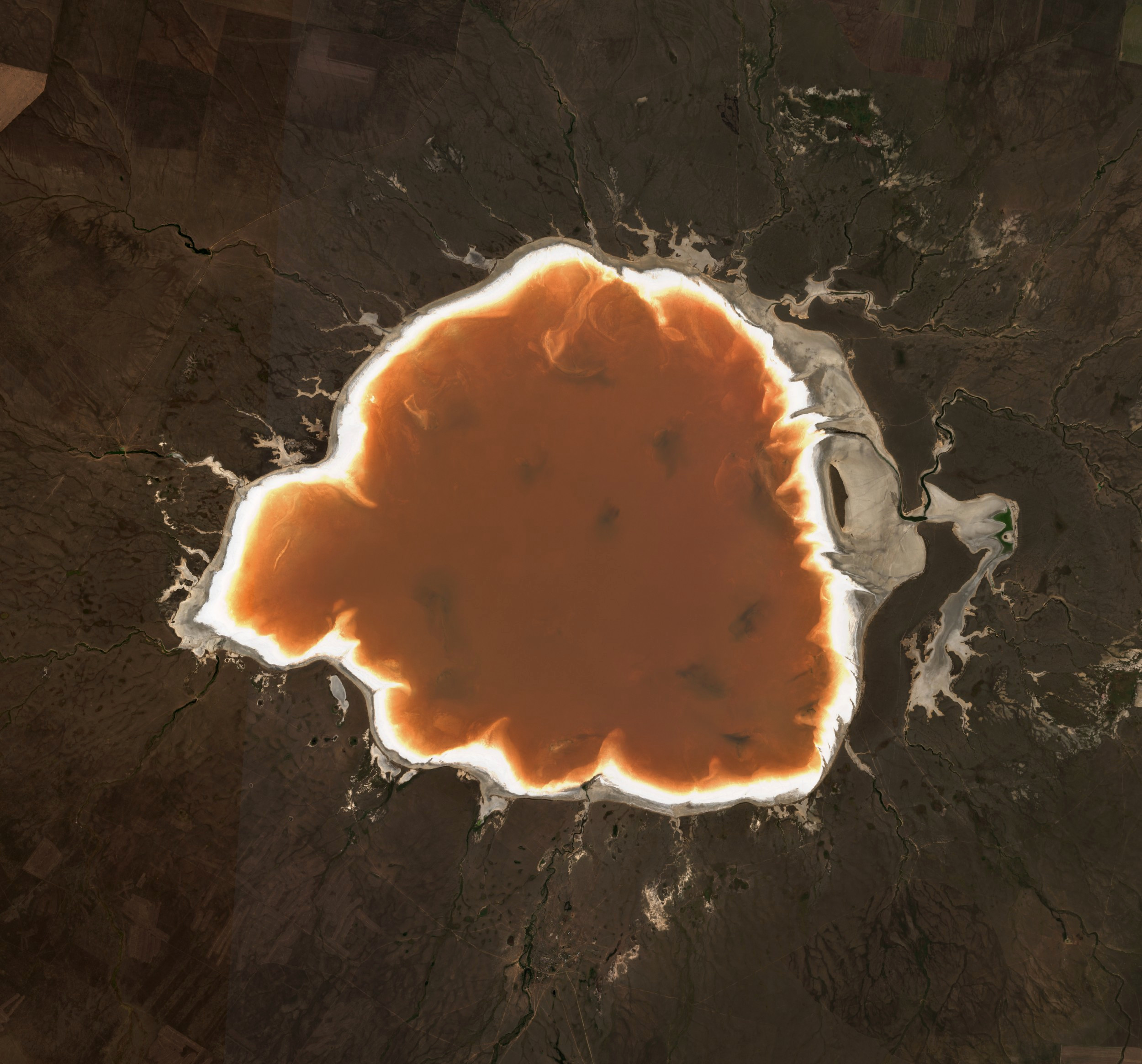
- Sentinel-2 image of the lake in 2021

- Location within Kazakhstan
- Location: Ishim Plain; West Siberian Plain
- Coordinates: 53°25′N 73°46′E
- Type: endorheic
- Primary inflows: Birsuat and Aksuat
- Basin countries: Kazakhstan
- Max. length: 18.8 kilometers (11.7 mi)
- Max. width: 14 kilometers (8.7 mi)
- Surface area: 175 square kilometers (68 sq mi)
- Average depth: 1.5 meters (4 ft 11 in)
- Shore length^{1}: 106.5 kilometers (66.2 mi)
- Surface elevation: 41 meters (135 ft)
- Islands: None
- ^{1} Shore length is not a well-defined measure.

Kyzylkak (Kazakh: Қызылқақ; Russian: Кызылкак) is a bittern salt lake in Ertis District, Pavlodar Region, Kazakhstan.

The lake lies 14 kilometers (8.7 mi) to the east of the northern end of larger Siletiteniz lake. There are no settlements by the lakeshore. The nearest inhabited locality is Kyzylkak village, located 3 kilometers (1.9 mi) to the south of the southern coastline of the lake.

== Geography ==
Kyzylkak is an endorheic lake located in the Ishim Plain, south of the Russian border. It lies in the lowest part of a large depression and its shores are very steep. The bottom of the lake has a thick layer of black mud containing magnesium salts and releasing Hydrogen sulphide. Lake Kyzylkak is fed mainly by snow, but owing to its high salinity it does not freeze in the winter.

The Birsuat, Agynsay and Aksuat are the main rivers flowing into the lake. Depending on the rainfall the surface area of the lake varies between 172 square kilometers (66 sq mi) and 188 square kilometers (73 sq mi) on average.

== See also ==
- List of lakes of Kazakhstan
