= Ebeyty =

Salt lake in Omsk Oblast, Russian Federation

- Эбейты
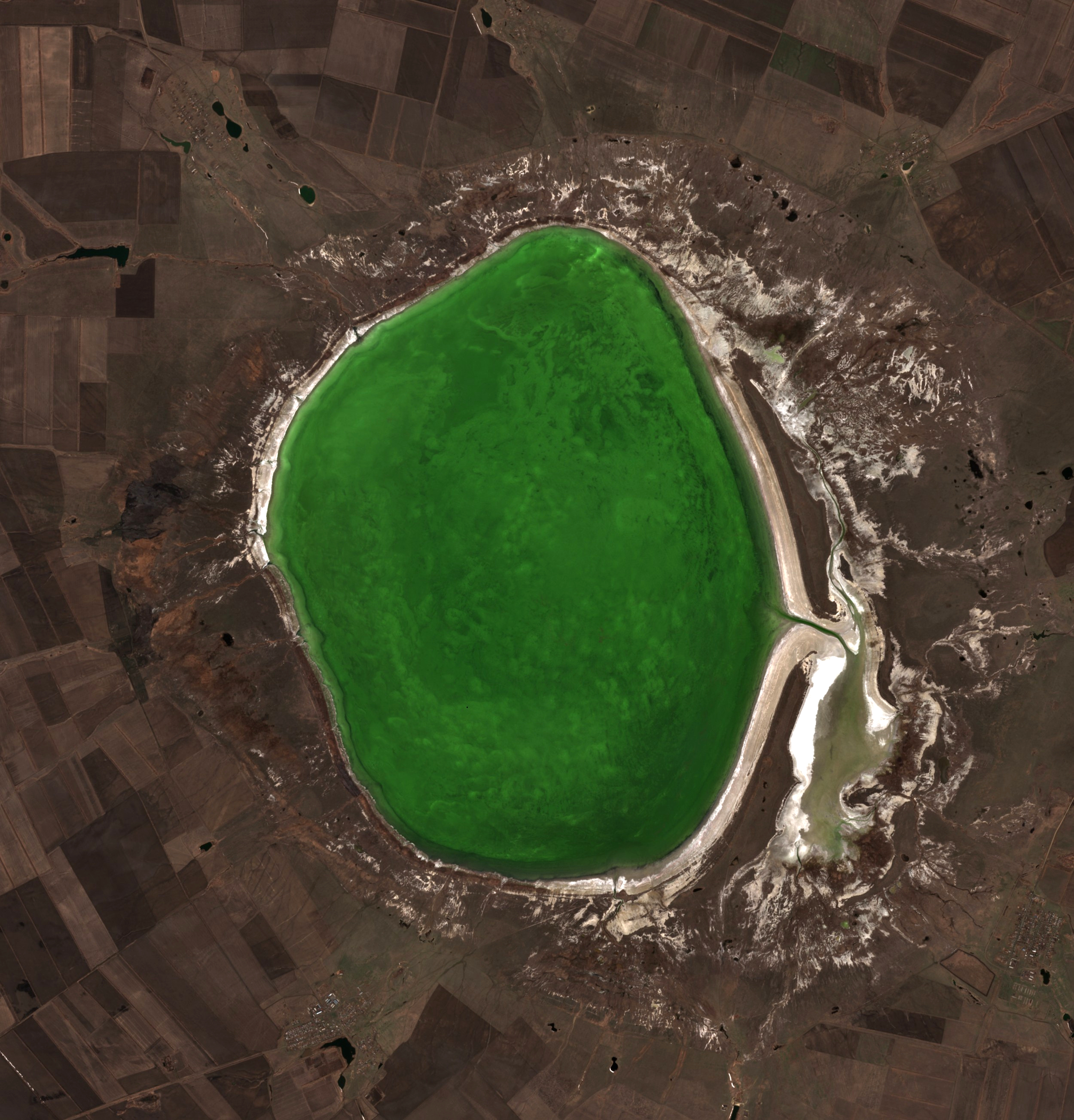
- 2022 Sentinel-2 image of the lake in April

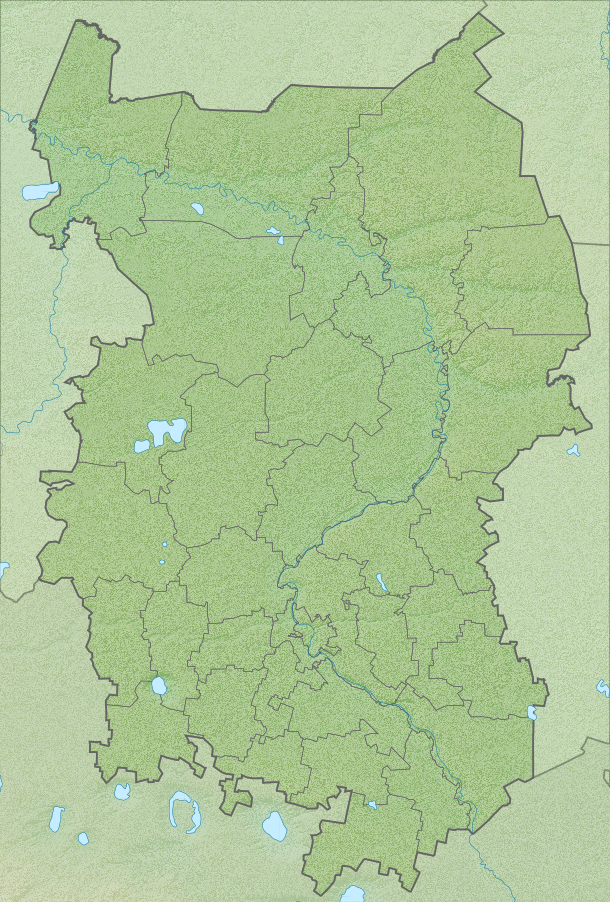
- Location within Omsk Oblast Location within Russia
- Location: Ishim Steppe; West Siberian Plain
- Coordinates: 54°39′N 71°45′E
- Type: endorheic
- Basin countries: Russia
- Max. length: 14 km (8.7 mi) (12 km (7.5 mi))
- Max. width: 11 km (6.8 mi) (7 km (4.3 mi))
- Surface area: 113 km^{2} (44 sq mi) (90 km^{2} (35 sq mi))
- Average depth: 3 m (9.8 ft) (0.6 m (2 ft 0 in))
- Shore length^{1}: 34 km (21 mi)
- Surface elevation: 54 m (177 ft)
- Islands: None
- ^{1} Shore length is not a well-defined measure.

Ebeyty (Russian: Эбейты) is a salt lake in Omsk Oblast, Russian Federation.

The Kazakhstan–Russia border lies about 50 km (31 mi) to the southeast of the lake. Ebeyty lies at the tripoint of Moskalensky, Poltavsky and Isilkulsky districts. The waters of the lake are reputed to have healing properties.

== Geography ==
Ebeyty lies in the southern part of the Ishim Plain, the southernmost sector of the West Siberian Plain. It is a saline endorheic lake located at the bottom of a depression. In the summer the lake shrinks to an area of 90 km^{2} (35 sq mi). Ebeyty is the largest salt lake in Omsk Oblast. Lake Kishi-Karoy, of similar characteristics, lies 70 km (43 mi) to the SSW, on the Kazakhstan side of the border, and lake Ulzhay far to the ESE, beyond the Irtysh.

The bottom of the lake is muddy. Ebeyty is mainly fed by snow.

== Flora ==
The Ebeyty basin lies in the transition area between forest-steppe and steppe vegetation. Owing to the high salinity, halophytic plant species dominate.

== See also ==
- List of lakes of Russia
