= Kishkenekol =

Kishkenekol Кішкенекөл
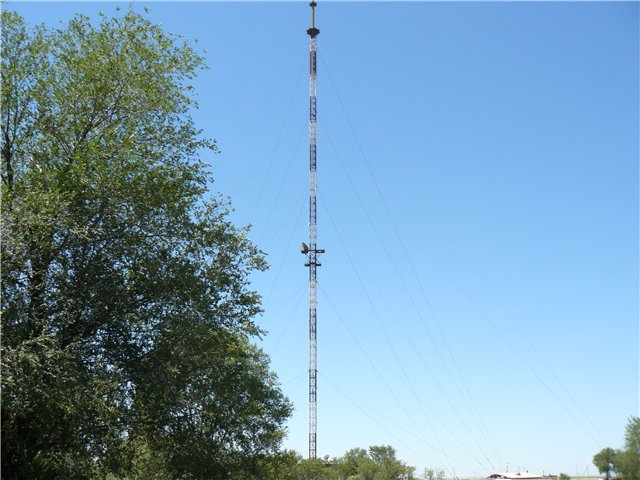
- Kzyl-Tu radio station antenna

- Location within Kazakhstan
- Coordinates: 53°38′22″N 72°20′38″E
- Country: Kazakhstan
- Regione: North Kazakhstan Region
- District: Ualikhanov District

Population (2019)
  - Total: 7,421
- Postcode: 151200

Kishkenekol (Kazakh: Кішкенекөл; Russian: Кишкенеколь), known as Kyzyltu until 1997, is a village and the administrative center of Ualikhanov District, and the only settlement of Kishkenekol rural district North Kazakhstan Region, Kazakhstan (KATO code - 596430100). Population: 7,421 (2009 census results); 6,814 (1999 census results).

== Geography ==
Kishkenekol lies 340 kilometers (210 mi) southeast of Petropavl, the regional capital, and 24 kilometers (15 mi) southeast of lake Ulken Karoy. The new name Kışkeneköl (lit. "little lake") was given after the small lake in the town. There are numerous other lakes close by. The A-13 highway Kokshetau — Bidayik (Kazakhstan-Russia border) passes through the village.

== Climate ==
Kishkenekol has a warm-summer humid continental climate (Dfb) according to the Köppen climate classification.

Climate data for Kishkenekol (1991–2020)
Month	Jan	Feb	Mar	Apr	May	Jun	Jul	Aug	Sep	Oct	Nov	Dec	Year
Record high °C (°F)	2.0 (35.6)	3.0 (37.4)	13.0 (55.4)	30.0 (86.0)	37.8 (100.0)	39.1 (102.4)	41.0 (105.8)	39.0 (102.2)	34.8 (94.6)	26.6 (79.9)	13.1 (55.6)	7.0 (44.6)	41.0 (105.8)
Mean daily maximum °C (°F)	−13.1 (8.4)	−11.3 (11.7)	−3.4 (25.9)	10.8 (51.4)	20.0 (68.0)	24.6 (76.3)	25.9 (78.6)	23.9 (75.0)	17.4 (63.3)	9.3 (48.7)	−2.8 (27.0)	−9.6 (14.7)	7.6 (45.7)
Daily mean °C (°F)	−17.1 (1.2)	−15.4 (4.3)	−7.8 (18.0)	5.2 (41.4)	13.6 (56.5)	19.0 (66.2)	20.4 (68.7)	18.1 (64.6)	11.4 (52.5)	4.0 (39.2)	−6.9 (19.6)	−13.7 (7.3)	2.6 (36.7)
Mean daily minimum °C (°F)	−21.0 (−5.8)	−19.5 (−3.1)	−12.0 (10.4)	−0.1 (31.8)	7.1 (44.8)	13.0 (55.4)	14.9 (58.8)	12.7 (54.9)	5.9 (42.6)	−0.3 (31.5)	−10.5 (13.1)	−17.7 (0.1)	−2.3 (27.9)
Record low °C (°F)	−41.1 (−42.0)	−41.0 (−41.8)	−32.2 (−26.0)	−23.9 (−11.0)	−8.3 (17.1)	−1.4 (29.5)	−1.4 (29.5)	−1.4 (29.5)	−6.1 (21.0)	−20.0 (−4.0)	−42.4 (−44.3)	−43 (−45)	−43 (−45)
Average precipitation mm (inches)	14.8 (0.58)	12.3 (0.48)	13.4 (0.53)	19.3 (0.76)	25.4 (1.00)	39.6 (1.56)	55.5 (2.19)	45.1 (1.78)	22.1 (0.87)	21.8 (0.86)	21.4 (0.84)	18.2 (0.72)	308.9 (12.16)
Average precipitation days (≥ 1.0 mm)	4.8	3.9	3.5	4.5	5.4	6.0	8.2	6.8	4.6	5.7	5.7	5.8	64.9
Source 1: Pogoda.ru.net
Source 2: NOAA
