= Zhaksytuz =

Lake in Kazakhstan

- Жақсытұз
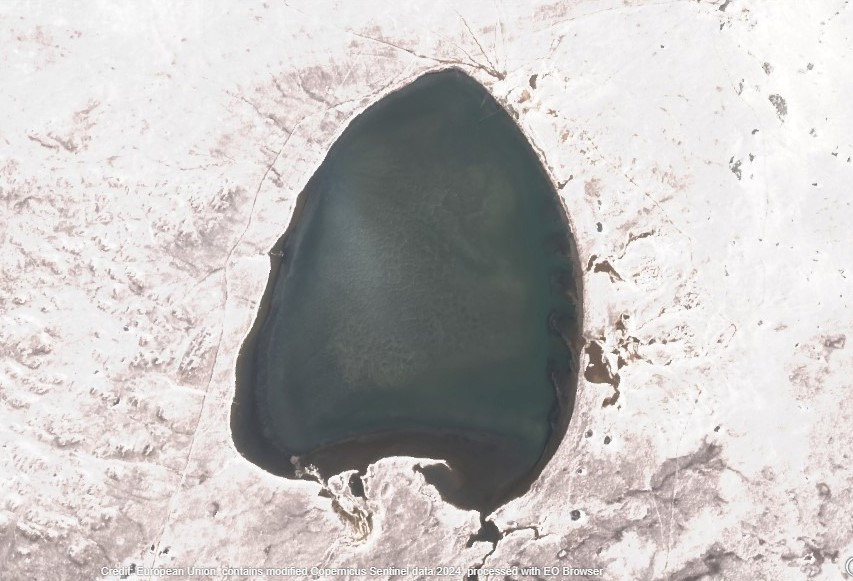
- Satellite photo of the lake

- Location within Kazakhstan
- Location: Ishim Plain
- Coordinates: 52°42′23″N 73°16′25″E
- Type: endorheic lake
- Basin countries: Kazakhstan
- Max. length: 5.1 kilometers (3.2 mi)
- Max. width: 3.8 kilometers (2.4 mi)
- Surface area: 15.9 square kilometers (6.1 sq mi)
- Residence time: UTC+6:00
- Surface elevation: 69.5 meters (228 ft)
- Islands: none

Zhaksytuz (Kazakh: Жақсытұз) is a salt lake in the Ualikhanov District, North Kazakhstan Region, and Yereymentau District, Akmola Region, Kazakhstan.

The border between the North Kazakhstan and Akmola regions cuts across the middle of the lake from east to west. The area surrounding lake Zhaksytuz is used for livestock grazing. In the spring the water is suitable for watering cattle. The name Zhaksytuz, meaning "good salt" in the Kazakh language, is of nomadic origin.

== Geography ==
Zhaksytuz is an endorheic lake part of the Sileti river basin. It lies at an elevation of 69.5 meters (228 ft). The lake has an arrowhead shape, pointing roughly north. The Sileti flows 20 kilometers (12 mi) east of the lake.

Lake Zhaksytuz is surrounded by steppe. It freezes in November and stays under ice until March or April. Its shore is flat on the east and south sides, and steep in the west. The southern end of the larger Lake Siletiteniz is 37 kilometers (23 mi) to the north, and lake Zhamantuz 24 kilometers (15 mi) to the north-northwest. Lake Kobeituz is 100 kilometers (62 mi) to the south.

== See also ==
- List of lakes of Kazakhstan
