= Talshik =

Talshik Талшық
- Village
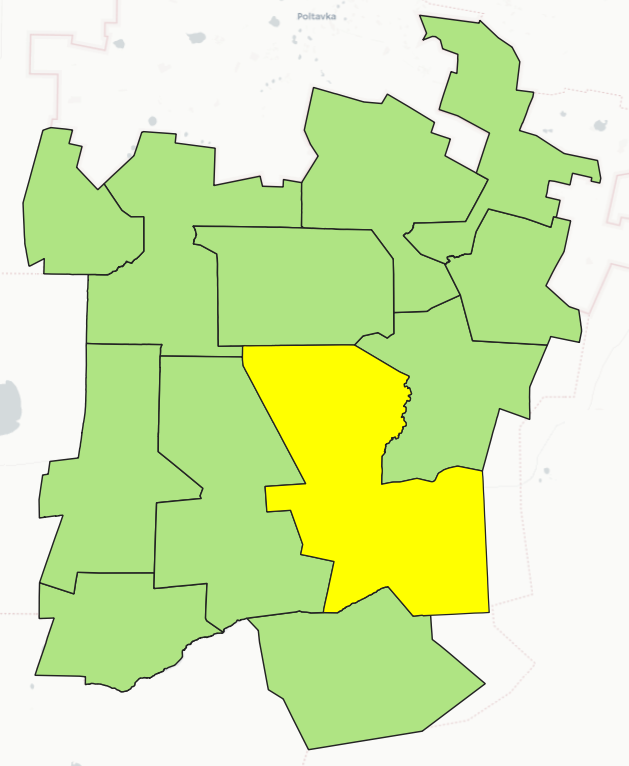
- Talshik Rural District

- Location in Kazakhstan
- Coordinates: 53°38′17″N 71°52′22″E
- Country: Kazakhstan
- Region: North Kazakhstan Region
- District: Akzhar District
- Rural District: Talshik Rural District
- Settled: 1962

Population (2009)
  - Total: 3,754
- Time zone: UTC+6 (East Kazakhstan Time)
- Post code: 150200

Talshik (Kazakh: Талшық) is a settlement and the administrative center of Akzhar District in North Kazakhstan Region of Kazakhstan. It is the head of the Talshik rural district (KATO code - 593430100). Population: 10,234 (2009 census results); 4,074 (1999 census results).

== Geography ==
Talshik is located 222 kilometers (138 mi) to the southeast of Petropavl, the regional capital. Lake Ulken-Karoy lies 20 kilometers (12 mi) to the north.
