= Teneke (river) =

River in Kazakhstan

Teneke Тенеке
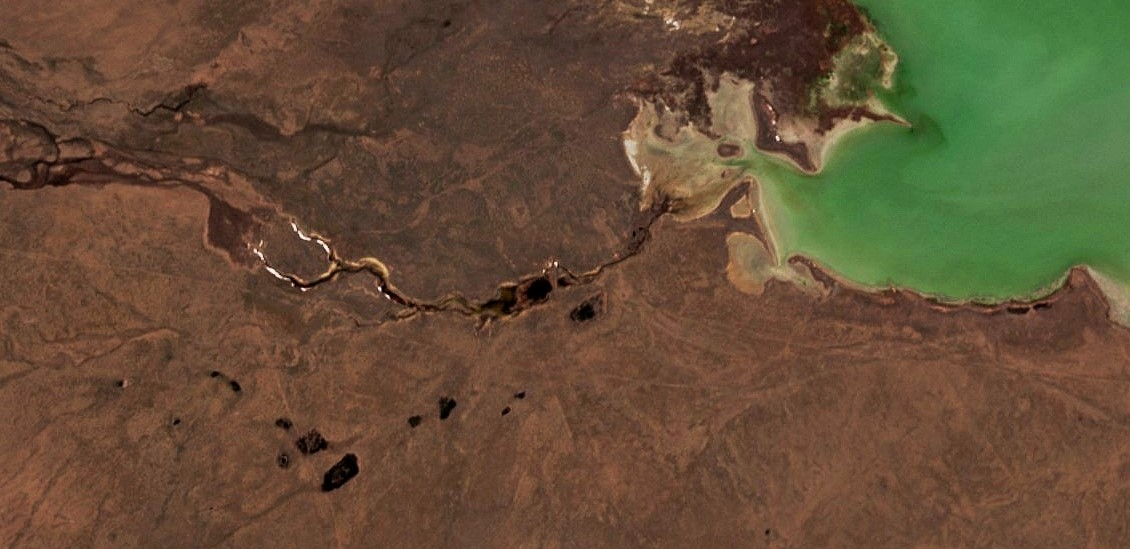
- Last stretch of the Teneke river and mouth in Sholaksor Sentinel-2 image

- Mouth location in Kazakhstan

Location
- Country: Kazakhstan

Physical characteristics
- Source: Mount Koyandy; Kazakh Uplands
  - coordinates: 54°04′30″N 73°25′34″E
  - elevation: c. 430 m (1,410 ft)
- Mouth: Sholaksor
  - coordinates: 52°27′07″N 73°58′24″E
  - elevation: c. 65 m (213 ft)
- Length: 95 km (59 mi)
- Basin size: 600 km^{2} (230 sq mi)

The Teneke (Kazakh: Тенеке; Russian: Тенеке) is a river in the Yereymentau District, Akmola Region, Kazakhstan. It has a length of 95 km (59 mi) and a drainage basin of 600 km^{2} (230 sq mi).

The Teneke flows across almost uninhabited territory. Its basin is used seasonally for livestock grazing and its water for watering local cattle. The name of the river originated in the Kazakh language word for "tin".

== Course ==
The Teneke originates in a spring located in Koyandy mountain of the Kazakh Uplands. In its first stretch it flows roughly northwards across the steppe, to the east of the Sileti and parallel to it. Halfway through its course the Teneke takes a wide bend and flows northeastwards, bending to the east in its final stretch. The Teneke has its mouth in the southwestern corner of the Sholaksor endorheic lake.

The Teneke is part of the Irtysh basin. It flows mainly in the spring with the thawing of the winter snows. In the summer it breaks up into disconnected pools. Like the Sileti, its channel is relatively shallow. The Teneke has 31 small tributaries with a total length of 95 km (59 mi).

== See also ==
- List of rivers of Kazakhstan
