= Akzhar District =

Coordinates: 53.889°N 71.563°E

Akzhar
- District
- Ақжар ауданы
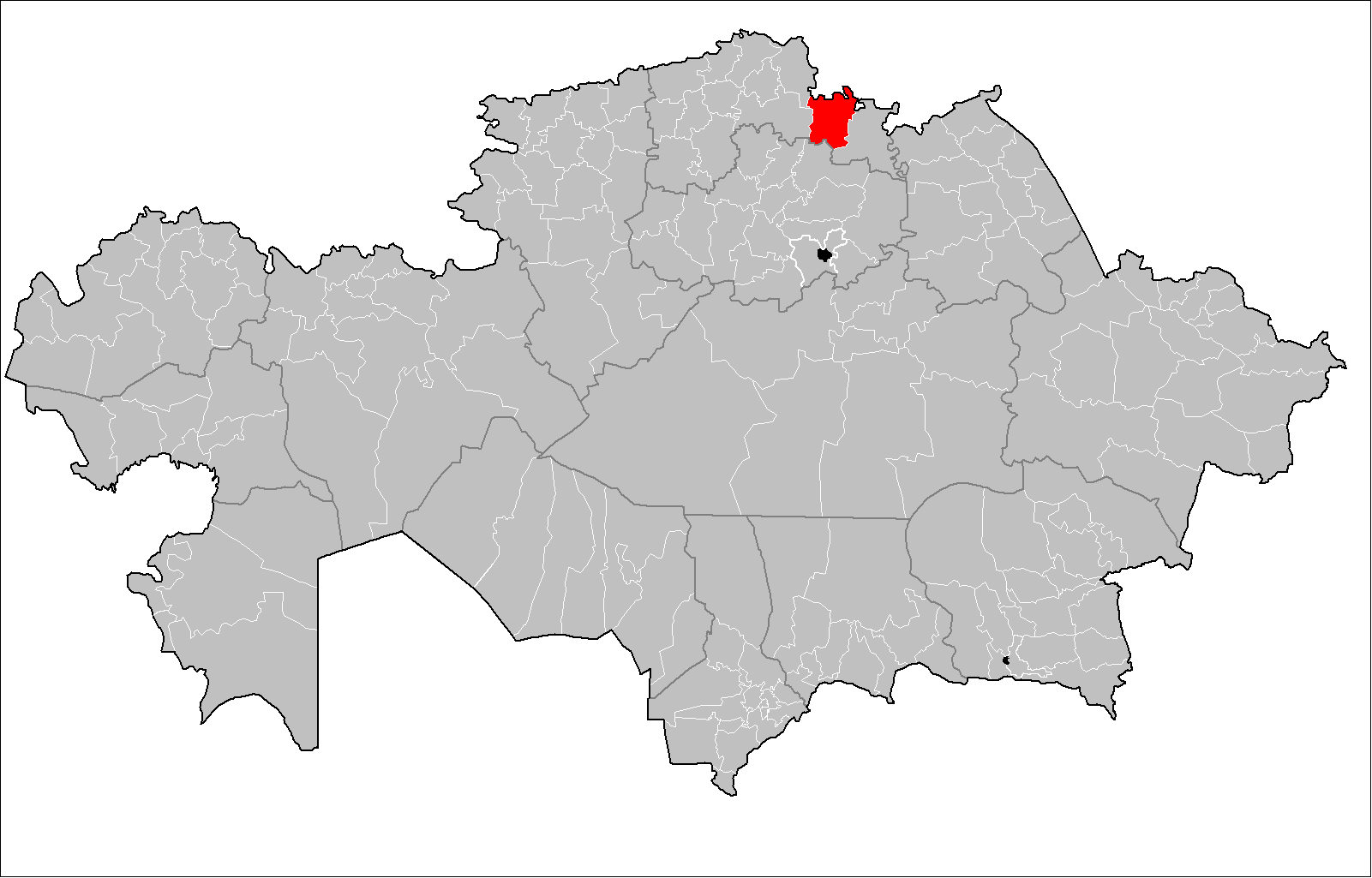
- Country: Kazakhstan
- Region: North Kazakhstan Region
- Administrative center: Talshik

Government
  - Akim: Kaliev Kanat Kairzhanovich

Population (2013)
  - Total: 17,989
- Time zone: UTC+6 (East)

Akzhar (Kazakh: Ақжар ауданы, Aqjar audany) is a district of North Kazakhstan Region in northern Kazakhstan. The administrative center of the district is the selo of Talshik. Population: 17,989 (2013 estimate); 18,975 (2009 census results); 27,176 (1999 census results).

== Geography ==
Lakes Ulken-Karoy and Kishi-Karoy are located in the district.
