= Ualikhanov District =

Coordinates: 53°38′22″N 72°20′38″E

Ualikhanov Уәлиханов
- District
- Уәлиханов ауданы
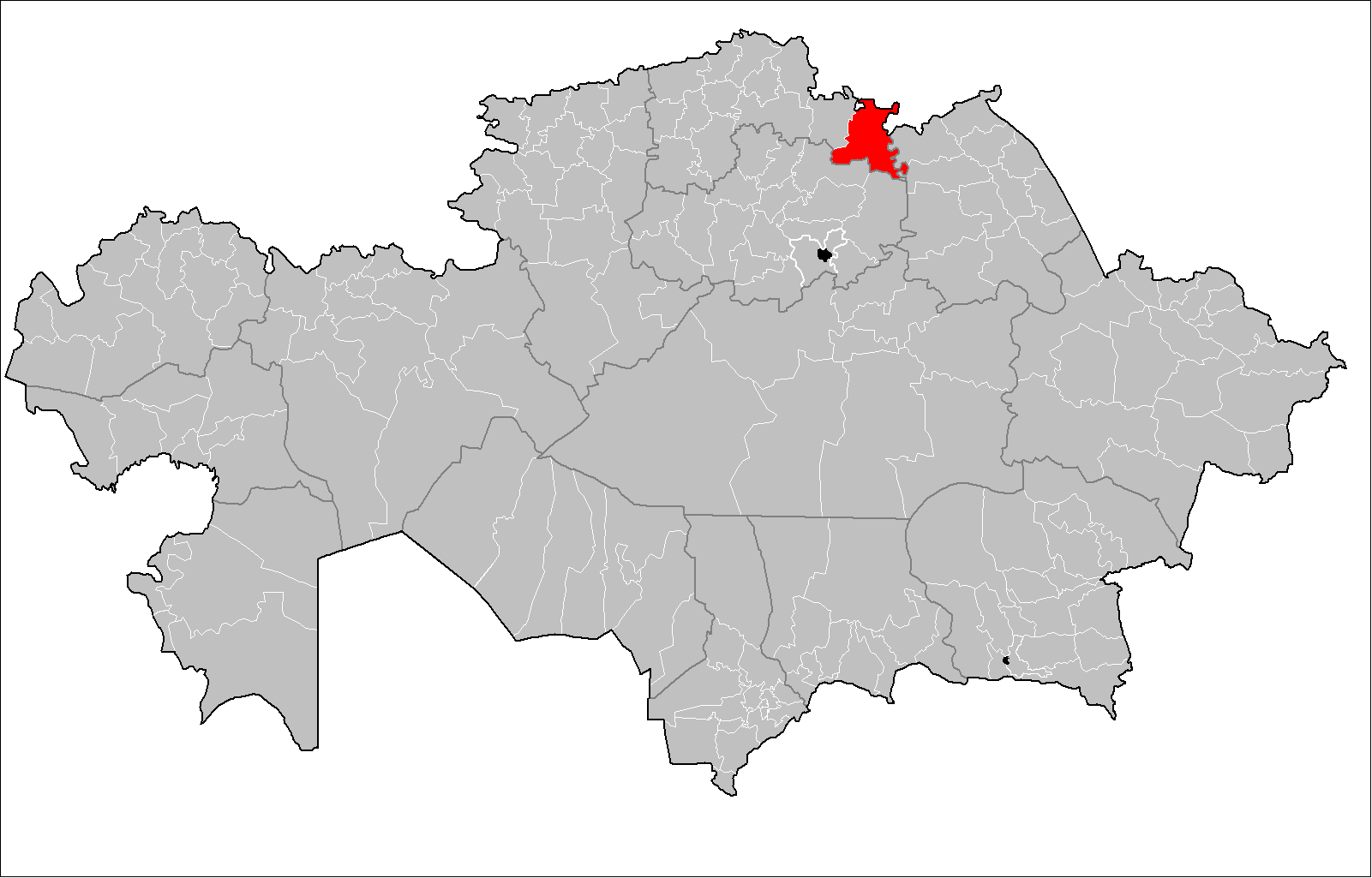
- Country: Kazakhstan
- Region: North Kazakhstan Region
- Administrative center: Kishkenekol

Government
  - Akim: Murat Abdulov

Population (2013)
  - Total: 17,596
- Time zone: UTC+6 (East)

Ualikhanov (Kazakh: Уәлиханов ауданы, Uälihanov audany) is a district of North Kazakhstan Region in northern Kazakhstan. Named in honor of Shoqan Walikhanov, a prominent 19th-century Kazakh scholar, ethnographer, historian, and geographer. The administrative center of the district is the selo of Kishkenekol. Population: 17,596 (2013 estimate); 17,991 (2009 census results); 25,920 (1999 census results).

== Geography ==
Lakes Siletiteniz, Zhamantuz, Zhaksytuz, Koksengirsor and Teke are located in the district.
