= Kishi-Karoy =

Lake in the country of Kazakhstan

- Кіші Қараой / Киши-Карой
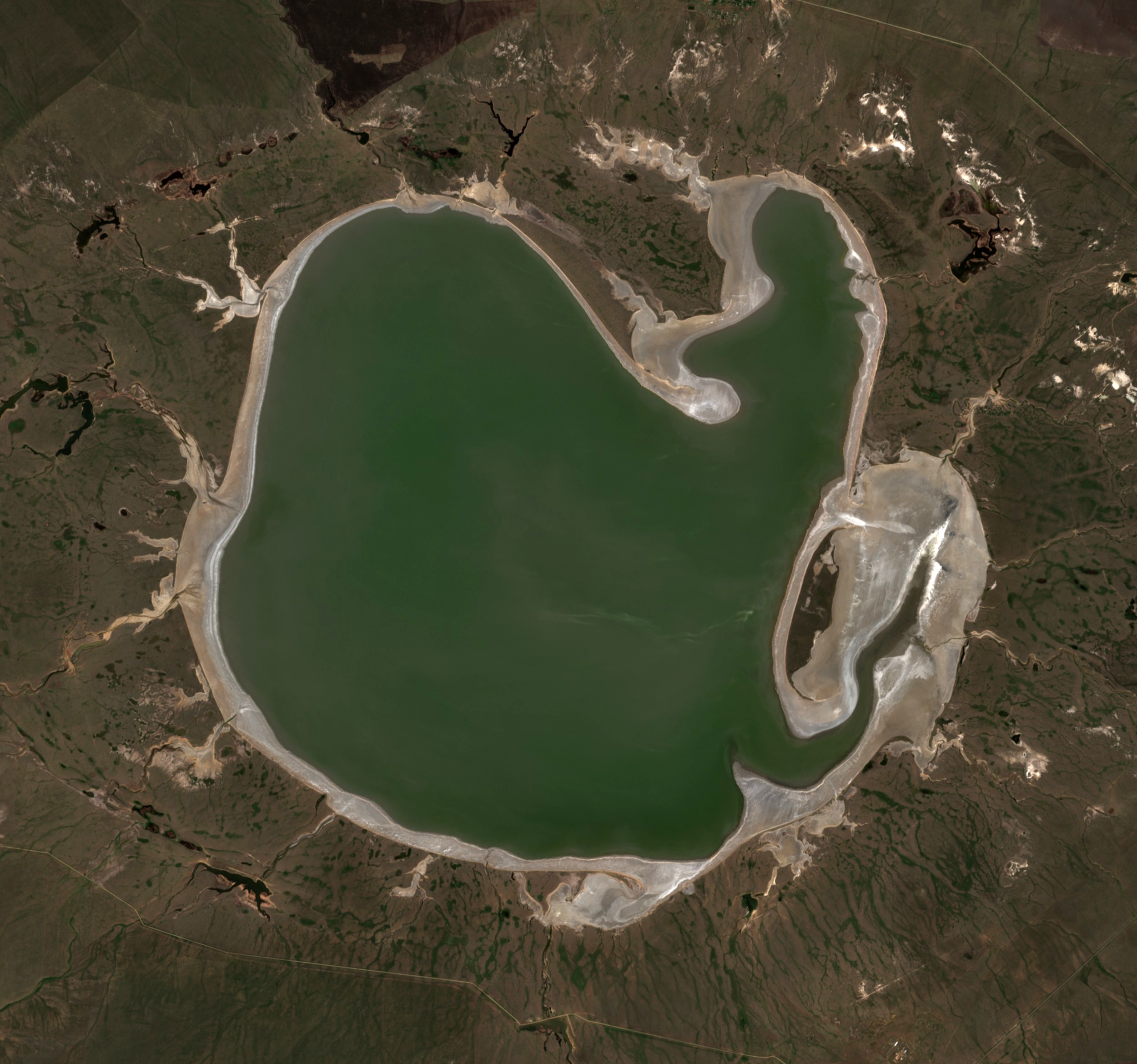
- 2021 Sentinel-2 image of the lake in May

- Location within Kazakhstan
- Location: Ishim Plain; West Siberian Plain
- Coordinates: 54°02′N 71°20′E
- Type: endorheic
- Basin countries: Kazakhstan
- Max. length: 12.7 kilometers (7.9 mi)
- Max. width: 12.1 kilometers (7.5 mi)
- Surface area: 102 square kilometers (39 sq mi)
- Shore length^{1}: 73.4 kilometers (45.6 mi)
- Surface elevation: 53 meters (174 ft)
- ^{1} Shore length is not a well-defined measure.

Kishi-Karoy or Kishi Karaoy, meaning "Little Karoy" (Kazakh: Кіші Қараой; Russian: Киши-Карой), is a bittern salt lake in Akzhar District, North Kazakhstan Region, Kazakhstan.

The Kazakhstan–Russia border lies about 5 kilometers (3.1 mi) to the northwest and northeast of the northern shores of the lake. Kishi-Karoy village, formerly Kievskoye, Bostandyk, Baytus and Kenashchi, formerly Menzhinskoye, are the nearest inhabited localities.

== Geography ==
Kishi-Karoy lies in the southern part of the Ishim Plain, the southernmost sector of the West Siberian Plain. It is an endorheic lake located at the bottom of a depression. Larger lake Ulken-Karoy (Big Karoy) lies to the east and Kalibek and Alabota to the southwest. Lake Ebeyty lies 70 kilometers (43 mi) to the NNE, on the Russian side of the border. In the summer Kishi-Karoy shrinks and becomes hypersaline and in years of drought the lake may dry completely up.

Kishi-Karoy is surrounded by salt marshes. The bottom is flat, in parts clayey. The lake is mainly fed by snow. No significant rivers feed its waters.

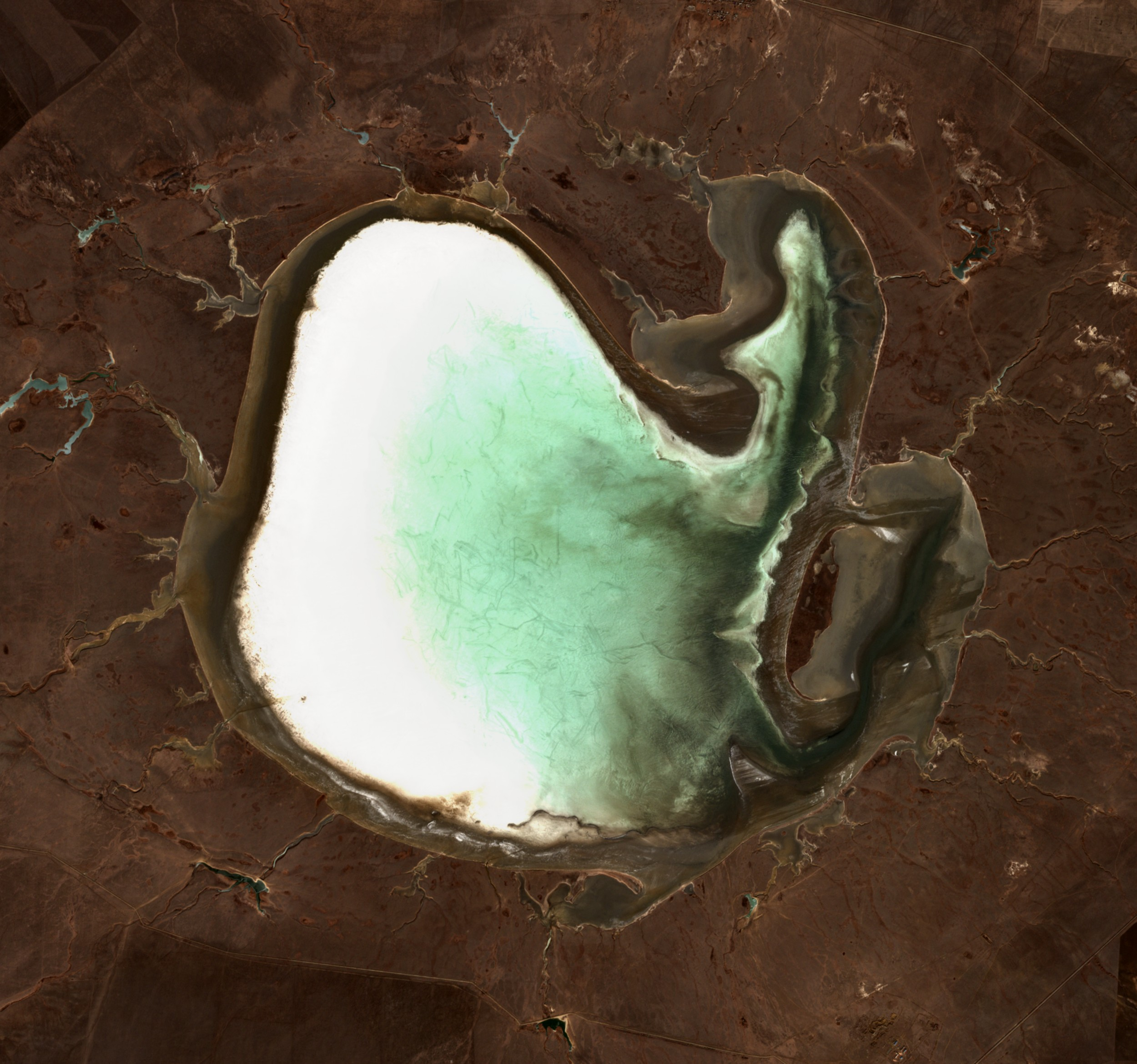
2021 Sentinel-2 image of the lake in November.

== Flora ==
Kishi-Karoy is surrounded by the arid Kazakh Steppe landscape where the main vegetation is sagebrush and fescue.

== See also ==
- List of lakes of Kazakhstan
