= Zhalauly =

Lake in Kazakhstan

- Жалаулы
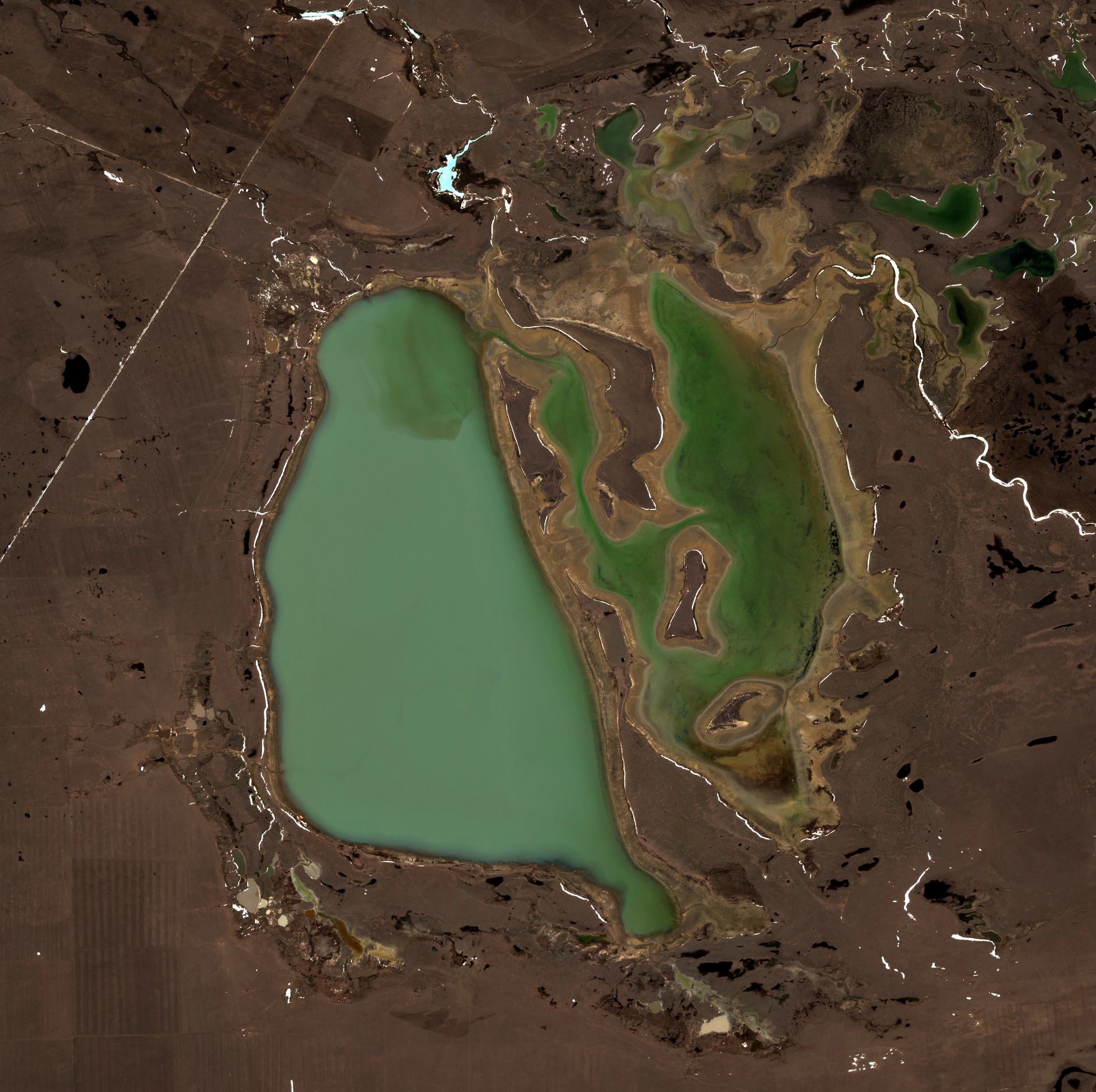
- Sentinel-2 image of the lake in April 2021

- Location within Kazakhstan
- Location: Ishim Plain; West Siberian Plain
- Coordinates: 52°52′N 74°07′E
- Type: endorheic
- Primary inflows: Shiderti
- Primary outflows: none
- Basin countries: Kazakhstan
- Max. length: 21 kilometers (13 mi)
- Max. width: 15 kilometers (9.3 mi)
- Surface area: 144 square kilometers (56 sq mi)
- Residence time: UTC+6
- Surface elevation: 66 meters (217 ft)

Zhalauly (Kazakh: Жалаулы; Russian: Жалаулы), is a salt lake in Aktogay District, Pavlodar Region, Kazakhstan.

Zhalauly is located about 15 kilometers (9.3 mi) northwest of lake Shyganak. Road R-170 passes close to the northwestern end of the lake.

== Geography ==
Zhalauly is an endorheic lake lying at the southern end of the Ishim Plain. It consists of a larger western lake and a smaller eastern one, connected at the northern end by a sound. Lake Sholaksor lies 31 kilometers (19 mi) to the south, and lake Zhaksytuz 53 kilometers (33 mi) to the WSW. There are small salt flats and salt marshes to the northeast. The lakeshores are dissected and largely swampy. The lake freezes in early November and thaws in late April.

During periods of drought the lake may completely dry up, but in rare years of exceptional snowfall, the waters of the Shiderti river (Karasu) may completely fill lake Shyganak to the south and the overflow may reach lake Zhalauli.

== See also ==
- List of lakes of Kazakhstan
