= Shiderti =

Shiderti Шідерті
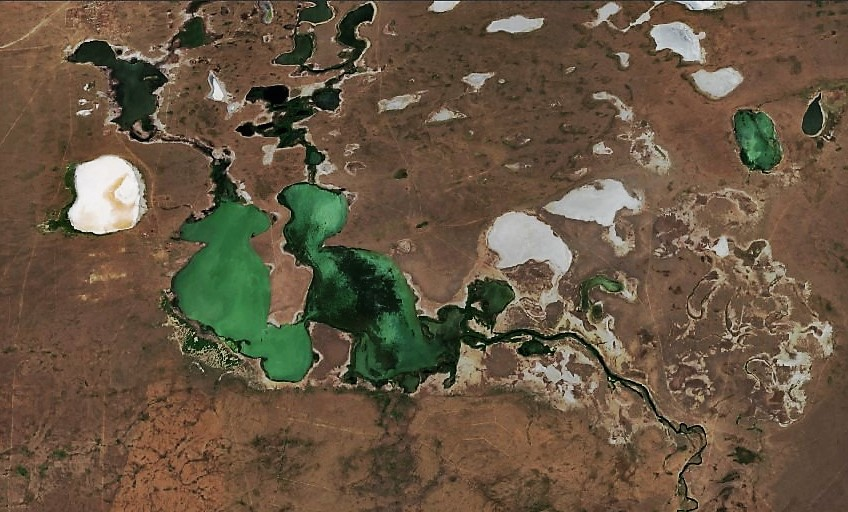
- Sentinel-2 image. View of the last stretch of the course of the river in the lower right

- Mouth location in Kazakhstan

Location
- Country: Kazakhstan

Physical characteristics
- Source: Kazakh Uplands
  - elevation: 589 m (1,932 ft)
- Mouth: lake Shaganak
  - coordinates: 52.646°N 74.395°E
  - elevation: 88 m (289 ft)
- Length: 506 km (314 mi)
- Basin size: 15,900 km^{2} (6,100 sq mi)

The Shiderti (Kazakh: Шідерті, Şıdertı; in its lower course: Karasu) is a river of Kazakhstan. It is 506 kilometres (314 mi) long, and has a drainage basin of 15,900 square kilometres (6,100 sq mi).

== Course ==
The river has its source under the name Sarapan in the central part of the Kazakh Uplands, northern part of Karaganda Region. It flows roughly northwestwards and discharges into lake Shaganak (Aktogay District). The Irtysh–Karaganda Canal runs along the Shiderti river in its upper and middle course flowing in the opposite direction.

== See also ==
- List of rivers of Kazakhstan
