= Sileti =

River in Kazakhstan

Sileti Сілеті / Силети
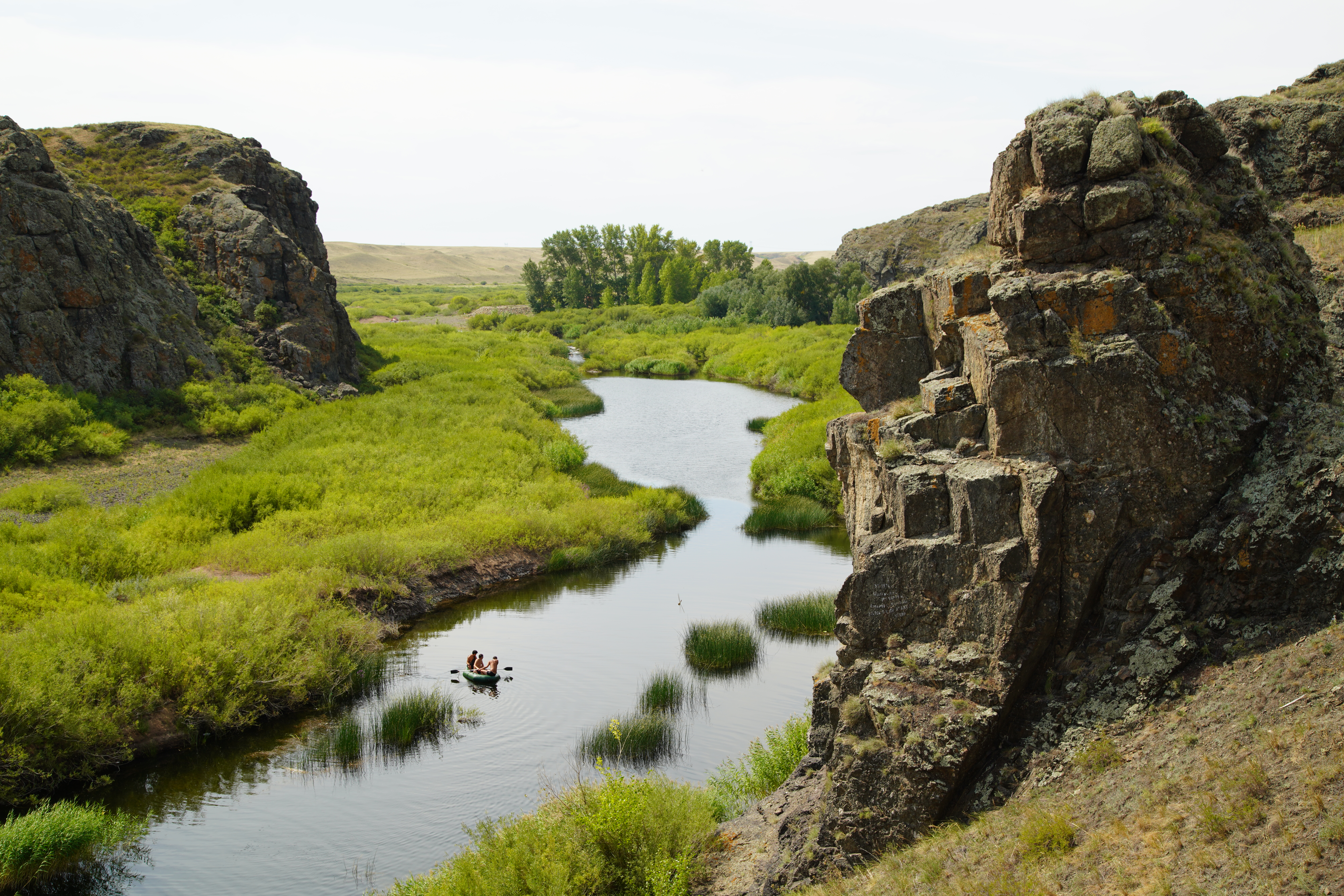
- Landscape of the river at the Bestobe Canyon

- Mouth location in Kazakhstan

Location
- Countries: Kazakhstan

Physical characteristics
- Source: Kazakh Uplands
  - coordinates: 51°27′24″N 71°14′45″E
  - elevation: 170 metres (560 ft)
- Mouth: Siletiteniz
  - coordinates: 53°04′28″N 73°24′15″E
  - elevation: 64.7 metres (212 ft)
- Length: 407 km (253 mi)
- Basin size: 18,500 km^{2} (7,100 sq mi)
- Discharge
  - average: 5.8 m^{3}/s (200 cu ft/s)

The Sileti (Kazakh: Сілеті; Russian: Силети) is a river in Kazakhstan. It is 407 kilometres (253 mi) long and has a catchment area of 18,500 square kilometres (7,100 sq mi).

The Sileti river system is an endorheic watershed in the Akmola, Pavlodar and North Kazakhstan regions of Kazakhstan.

== Course ==
The sources of the Sileti are near Bozaigyr village in the Kazakh Uplands. It flows roughly northeastwards in its upper and middle course, parallel to the Teneke. As it reaches its last stretch, the river divides into branches and bends northwards to the west of lake Zhalauly. In periods of adequate rainfall the river flows into the endorheic lake Siletiteniz from its southern end, but in dry years it doesn't reach the lake.

The main tributaries of the Sileti are the Koyandy, Akzhar, Zhartas, Kedey, Sholakkarasu and Shili. The Sileti Dam (Сілеті бөгені), with an area of 200 square kilometres (77 sq mi), was built near Sileti village in 1965, 133 km (83 mi) from the mouth of the river. Its reservoir provides water to Stepnogorsk city, located 140 km (87 mi) to the north. The water is used for drinking, industrial and agricultural purposes. The river is frozen between late October or mid-November until late March or early April. In some stretches, it freezes to the bottom.

== See also ==
- List of rivers of Kazakhstan
