= Ulken-Karoy =

Lake in the country of Kazakhstan

- Үлкен Қараой / Улькен-Карой
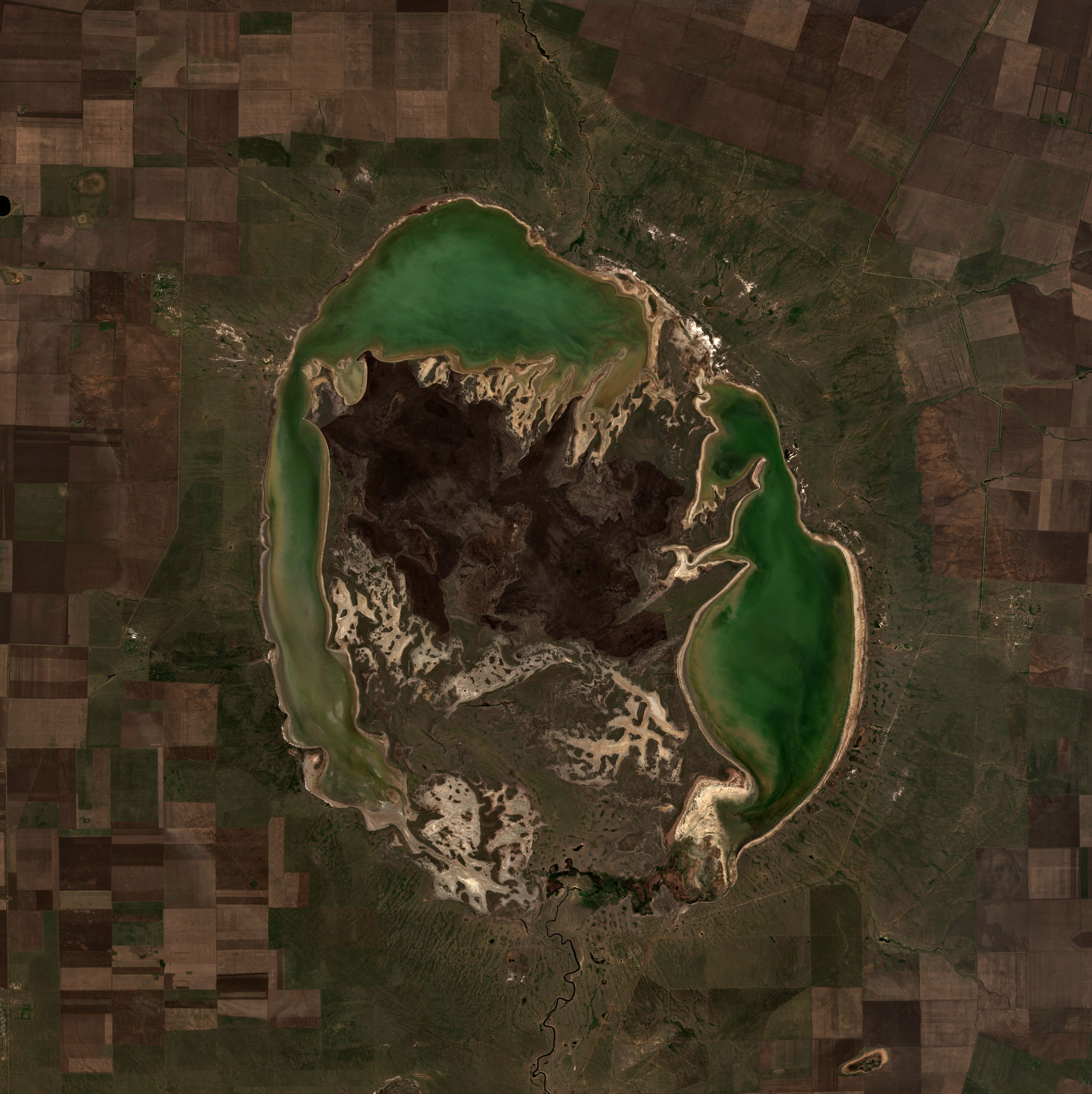
- Sentinel-2 image of the lake in 2020

- Location within Kazakhstan
- Location: Ishim Plain; West Siberian Plain
- Coordinates: 53°59′N 71°57′E
- Type: endorheic
- Primary inflows: Ashchisu and Karasu
- Basin countries: Kazakhstan
- Max. length: 67.7 kilometers (42.1 mi)
- Max. width: 11.9 kilometers (7.4 mi)
- Surface area: 305.5 square kilometers (118.0 sq mi)
- Surface elevation: 57 meters (187 ft)
- Islands: One

Ulken-Karoy or Ulken Karaoy, meaning "Big Karoy" (Kazakh: Үлкен Қараой; Russian: Улькен-Карой or Большой Карой —Bolshoy Karoy), is a salt lake in Akzhar District, North Kazakhstan Region, Kazakhstan.

The lake lies about 60 kilometers (37 mi) to the northwest of the northern end of larger Siletiteniz lake. 40 kilometers (25 mi) to the east lies lake Teke. The nearest inhabited localities are Kulykol and Talshik.

== Geography ==
Lying in the southern part of the Ishim Plain, south of the Russian border, Ulken-Karoy is one of the main lakes of the region. It is an endorheic lake sharing the same depression as lakes Teke in the east and Kishi-Karoy in the west. The lake is shallow and its bottom is muddy. The shores are flat. In years of drought Ulken-Karoy almost completely dries up and its water surface may decline to barely 5 square kilometers (1.9 sq mi). An enormous island occupies the middle of the lake. It is joined to the mainland in its southern part, except during periods of high water. In such periods the water of the lake becomes fresh.

Ulken-Karoy lake is surrounded by a strip of salt marshes. The Ashchisu and Karasu are the main rivers flowing into the lake.

== See also ==
- List of lakes of Kazakhstan
