= Siletiteniz =

Lake in the country of Kazakhstan

- Сілетітеңіз
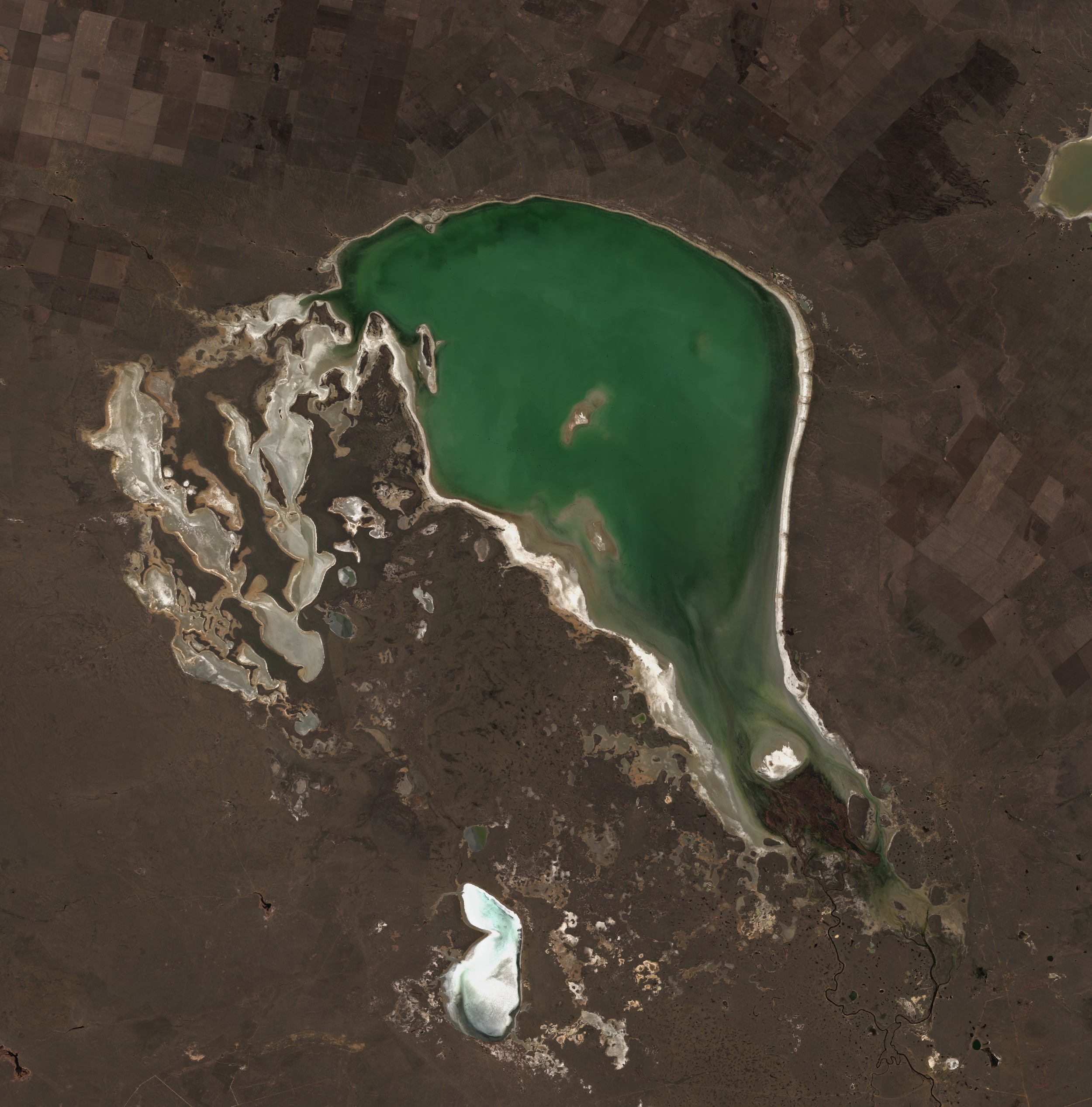
- Siletiteniz in 2022 Sentinel-2 image with lake Zhamantuz at the bottom.

- Location in Kazakhstan
- Location: Pavlodar Region; North Kazakhstan Region
- Coordinates: 53.28°N 73.26°E
- Type: endorheic
- Primary inflows: Sileti
- Basin countries: Kazakhstan
- Surface area: 777 km^{2} (300 sq mi)
- Max. depth: 3.2 m (10 ft)
- Water volume: 1.5 km^{3} (0.36 cu mi)
- Surface elevation: 64 m (210 ft)

Siletiteniz (Kazakh: Сілетітеңіз, Sıletıteñız), also Seletyteniz, Seletytengiz is an endorheic salt lake located in the Ishim Plain, part of the West Siberian Plain. The lake lies in North Kazakhstan, with the Pavlodar Region border running along the eastern lakeshore and the Kazakhstan-Russia border 6 kilometers (3.7 mi) to the north of the northeastern end.

Teniz is Kazakh for 'sea', but the etymology of Selety unclear. One hypothesis is that it derives from Yeniseian *sēre 'stag'.

== Geography ==
The lake basin covers 777 square kilometres (300 sq mi) but the actual area covered by water varies according to the seasons. The lake reaches a maximum depth of 3.2 metres (10 ft) and has a volume of about 1.5 cubic kilometres (0.36 cu mi). The northern and eastern shores are high and straight while the western shore is low-lying and indented, gradually giving way to salt marshes. Hydrogen sulfide is emitted from deposits at the bottom of the lake. Smaller lake Zhamantuz lies close to the southwestern tip, and lake Zhaksytuz 34 kilometers (21 mi) to the south. Other lakes in the vicinity are Kyzylkak 14 km (8.7 mi) to the east of its northern end, Teke 36 kilometers (22 mi) to the north, and Ulken-Karoy 60 km (37 mi) to the northwest.

The lake is mainly fed by snow. The Sileti River, which is 407 kilometres (253 mi) long and drains an area of 18,500 square kilometres (7,100 sq mi), sometimes reaches the lake during high water but usually dissipates into the marshes south of the lake.

== See also ==
- List of lakes of Kazakhstan
