= Aktogay, Pavlodar Region =

Aktogay Ақтоғай
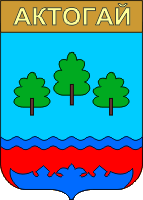
- Coat of arms

- Location in Kazakhstan
- Coordinates: 53°00′37″N 75°58′36″E
- Country: Kazakhstan
- Region: Pavlodar Region
- District: Aktogay District
- Rural District: Aktogay Rural District
- Established: 1907
- Elevation: 330 ft (100 m)

Population (2023)
  - Total: 4,430
- Time zone: UTC+6
- Postcode: 140200

Aktogay (Kazakh: Ақтоғай), known as Krasnokutsk until 1993, is a settlement in Pavlodar Region, Kazakhstan. It is the capital of Aktogay District and the administrative center of the Aktogay Rural District (KATO code — 553230100). Population: 4,080 (2009 census results); 4,800 (1999 census results).

== Geography ==
Aktogay lies surrounded by flat grassy steppe. It is located on the left bank of the Irtysh, 105 kilometers (65 mi) to the NNW of Pavlodar, the regional capital.
