= Aqtogai District, Pavlodar Region =

Coordinates: 52°42′00″N 75°28′48″E

Aktogay Ақтоғай
- District
- Ақтоғай ауданы
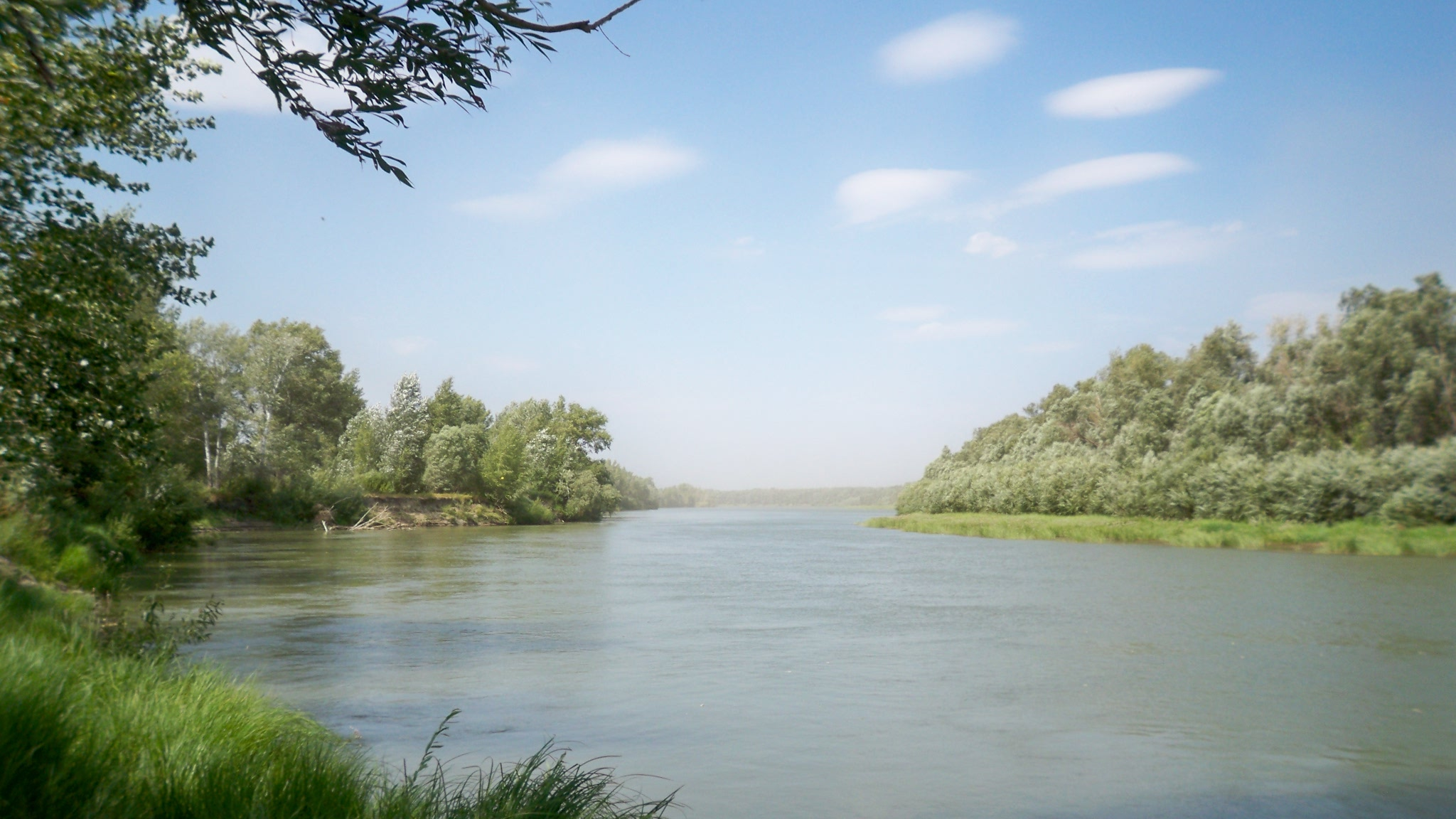
- Irtysh River in Aktogay District

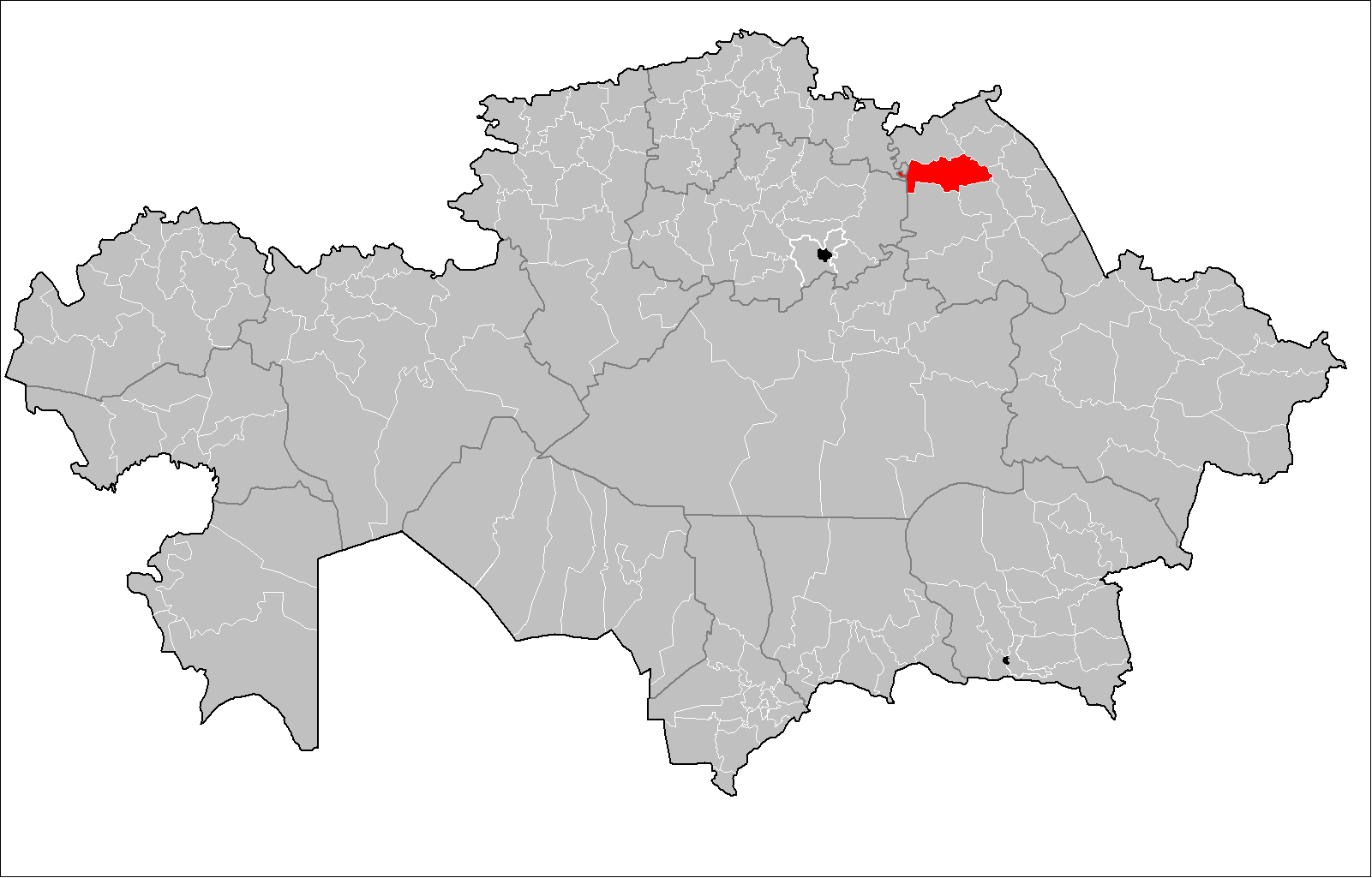
- Country: Kazakhstan
- Region: Pavlodar Region
- Administrative center: Aktogay
- Founded: 1938

Government
  - Akim: Arynov Karshyga Zalmukhanovich

Area
  - Total: 3,800 sq mi (9,800 km^{2})

Population (2013)
  - Total: 13,735
- Time zone: UTC+6 (East)

Aqtogai (Kazakh: Ақтоғай ауданы, Aqtoğai audany) is a district of Pavlodar Region in northern Kazakhstan. The administrative center of the district is the selo of Aktogay. Population: 13,735 (2013 estimate); 15,114 (2009 census results); 21,056 (1999 census results).

== Physico-geographical characteristic ==
=== Geographic location ===
The area is 9.8 thousand km² (7.69% of the territory of the region). It occupies the 5th place in terms of size among the districts of the region. Aktogay District is located in the south of the West Siberian Plain, on the left bank of the Irtysh. In the north it borders on Irtysh district, in the south - on the rural areas of the cities of Aksu and Ekibastuz, in the west - on Akmola and North Kazakhstan regions, in the east - with Terenkol region and Pavlodar regions along the Irtysh river.

=== Climate ===
Climate Sharply continental climate. The average temperature in January is -17°-19 °C, in July - +20°+21 °C. Annual amount of atmospheric precipitation - 250-300 mm.

=== Relief and Hydrography ===
The relief of the territory is flat (Irtysh plain). There are numerous salt lakes, such as Zhamantuz. Reserves of natural building materials have been explored in the bowels. Minerals: common salt, sands, clays.

=== Flora and fauna ===
The vegetation is steppe, forb-feather grass; poplar, maple, willow, meadowsweet grow in the river valleys. Live wolf, fox, hare, korsak, badger, gopher, hamster.
