= 2025 Semey akim election =

- 12 October 2025
- Turnout: 53.70%
Candidate	Ädilet Qojanbaev	Qanyş Töleuov	Aibolat Bekjasarov
Party	Independent	Independent	Independent
Popular vote	89,441	12,557	9,763
Percentage	77.06%	10.82%	8.41%
Äkim before election
Bekjan Bapyşev
(acting)
Elected Äkim
Ädilet Qojanbaev
Independent

The 2025 Semey akim election was held on 12 October 2025 to elect the akim (mayor) of Semey, a city of regional significance in the Abai Region of Kazakhstan. It was the first direct mayoral election in both the city's and the country's history for a regional center, following the early dismissal of akim Talgat Muratov in August 2025.

Although four candidates were initially registered, one withdrew before election day, leaving three candidates, all officially running as independents but affiliated with the Amanat party. Ädilet Qojanbaev, akim of Kokpekti District, won with 77.1% of the vote, becoming Semey's first directly elected akim.

== Background ==
Semey is a city in Kazakhstan with a population of more than 300,000. Its status is officially classified as a city of regional significance, and it functions as the administrative center of the Abai Region.

As part of political modernization, Kazakhstan has begun introducing a system of direct elections since 2021 for akims (administrative heads), starting from the level of villages, settlements, rural districts, and cities of district significance. In November 2023, several pilot elections for akims of districts and cities of regional significance were conducted, intended as a deliberate step in the gradual transition toward direct elections of local leaders. Those pilot elections included those held in Kurchatov City and Abai District.

In the 2024 State of the Nation Address, President Kassym-Jomart Tokayev announced that beginning in 2025, akims of districts as well as cities of regional significance would also be chosen by direct vote of the population. These elections are planned to take place after the expiration of the terms of appointed incumbent akims.

Talgat Muratov, who had served as akim of Semey since his appointment in December 2024, was dismissed from his post on 18 August 2025 ahead of schedule by the akim of Abai Region, Berik Uali. The decision followed reports that Muratov had allegedly gone on vacation in April and did not return to the performance of his official duties, from which became publicly known after the territorial election commission published a resolution scheduling the akim election in Semey for 12 October 2025. Since then, Bekjan Bapyşev has temporarily served as acting akim.

== Electoral system ==
Before the election, akims of Semey used to be appointed by the Abai Regional Äkim on the recommendation of the Presidential Administration of Kazakhstan.

In accordance with Article 36-2 of the Law "On Local Government and Self-Government in the Republic of Kazakhstan", the akim is elected for a four-year term by the population of the respective administrative-territorial unit through universal, equal and direct suffrage by secret ballot. Candidates must be citizens of Kazakhstan who have reached the age of 25 and who meet the requirements of the law as well as the electoral law. The same individual may not be elected to the position of akim for more than two consecutive terms.

== Timetable ==
The Semey Territorial Election Commission under Resolution No.7 published an official timetable for the 2025 Semey election, highlighting the main stages:

- 28 August – 11 September 2025: Candidate nomination and registration period.
- 16 September – 11 October 2025: Official campaign period, including candidate meetings and placement of campaign materials.
- 12 October 2025: Election day, from 07:00 to 20:00 local time.
- 12–15 October 2025: Vote counting and aggregation of results.
- 15 October 2025: Official determination of election results.
- By 19 October 2025: Publication of results and registration of the elected akim.

== Candidates ==
A total of eight individuals were nominated to contest the election for akim of Semey, all of them are self-nominees (independents).

=== Registered ===
Following verification of documents and special checks, four candidates were registered by the Semey Territorial Electoral Commission (TEC) according by commission chairman Güljan Quanyşeva during the pre-election period. Quanyşeva also added that the candidates would still be subject to additional reviews by the National Security Committee and the tax authorities, and could be excluded from the race if discrepancies were found.

Candidate name and birth year	Political office(s)	Nomination	Details
Ädilet Qojanbaev (born 1980)	Äkim of Kokpekti District (2024–2025); Head of Abai Region Financial Office (2022–2024)	Self-nominated	Member of the Amanat party
Aibolat Bekjasarov (born 1963)	Chairman of Semey City Mäslihat (?–2025)	Self-nominated	Member of the Amanat party
Qanyş Töleuov (born 1972)	Director of the Higher College of Geodesy, Cartography, and Construction (since ?)	Self-nominated	Member of the Amanat party

=== Withdrawn ===
- Qanat Şapatov – Head of the Palace of Children and Youth Creativity in Semey and a deputy of the Semey City Mäslihat, officially withdrew his candidacy on 7 October 2025.

=== Rejected ===
Four candidates were not registered after the verification process.

- Baqytbek Baiburov – former head of the Semey Emergency Department. His registration was denied on 12 September 2025 by the Semey TEC, which cited "non-compliance with the requirements of the law" but did not specify the grounds. Baiburov filed an administrative lawsuit to the Specialized Interdistrict Administrative Court of the Abai Region, arguing that his professional background satisfied the statutory criteria, but his case was upheld on 19 September.

A projected frontrunner for the election, incumbent acting äkim of Semey, Bekjan Bapyşev, was unexpectedly not present among the registered candidates. It is speculated that he is one of the three unnamed people unsuccessful to register.

== Campaign ==
The registration of candidates for the office of akim of Semey concluded at 18:00 on 16 September 2025. Immediately after the close of registration, the official campaign period began, running until 00:00 on 11 October.

The Semey Territorial Election Commission (TEC) designated 26 public facilities across the city, including cultural centers, schools, and libraries, as venues for meetings between candidates and voters. In addition, 30 locations were assigned for the placement of printed campaign materials. The schedule of candidate meetings was to be coordinated by election commissions in cooperation with local executive bodies and published through the media.

== Conduct ==
More than 220 thousand people have the right to vote in Semey. 112 billion tenge was the city's budget, according to open sources and Radio Free Europe. 128 polling stations will participate in the election, 110 of them are public, and 18 are not.

== Results ==
The Semey Territorial Election Commission announced the results of the akim election on 14 October 2025. Ädilet Qojanbaev was elected akim of Semey, becoming the city's first directly elected mayor. According to the commission, Qojanbaev received 77.1% of the votes, "confidently surpassing his opponents." The Semey TEC stated that the election "was held in an open and calm atmosphere, observing all established procedures," and reported a high voter turnout, which it said, "demonstrated citizens’ confidence in the direct electoral system."

Candidate	Party	Votes	%
Ädilet Qojanbaev	Independent	89,441	77.06
Qanyş Töleuov	Independent	12,557	10.82
Aibolat Bekjasarov	Independent	9,763	8.41
Against all		4,310	3.71
Total		116,071	100.00
Valid votes		116,071	97.91
Invalid/blank votes		2,482	2.09
Total votes		118,553	100.00
Registered voters/turnout		220,761	53.70
Source: Semey Territorial Election Commission

== Aftermath ==
On 14 October 2025, Ädilet Qojanbaev officially assumed office as the akim of Semey. The presentation ceremony was attended by the akim of Abai Region, Berik Uali, who described the election as a historic milestone for both Semey and Kazakhstan, reflecting the process of political modernization initiated by President Kassym-Jomart Tokayev.

In his remarks, Qojanbaev stated that the position carried both "great responsibility and honor," expressing gratitude for the trust placed in him by the citizens. He emphasized his commitment to "work together to improve the social conditions of the people," noting that "a great deal of work lies ahead."
