= Talgat Muratov =

Kazakh politician

- Талғат Мұратов

Äkim of Semey
- In office 23 December 2024 – 18 August 2025
- Preceded by: Nurbol Nursagatov
- Succeeded by: Bekjan Bapyşev (Acting)

Äkim of Beskaragay District
- In office 6 October 2022 – 2024

Personal details
- Born: 28 January 1972 (age 54) Kälpe, Alma-Ata Oblast, Kazakh SSR, Soviet Union (now Jetisu Region, Kazakhstan)
- Education: Kazakh Leading Academy of Architecture and Civil Engineering; Innovations University of Kazakhstan; International University of Transportation and Humanities

Talğat Batyrūly Mūratov (Kazakh: Талғат Батырұлы Мұратов; born 28 January 1972) is a Kazakh politician, who served as Äkim of Semey from December 2024 to August 2025.

== Early life and education ==
Muratov was born in the village Kälpe, Karatal District, then-Alma-Ata Oblast of Soviet Kazakhstan, on 28 January 1972.

In 2007, Muratov ended his studies at the Kazakh Leading Academy of Architecture and Civil Engineering, and the Innovations University of Kazakhstan in 2015. In 2018, he finished the International University of Transportation and Humanities (then Kazakh University of Transportation Communications).

Muratov began his career in 1993 as executive director to "Stroydetal", an individual enterprise.

From 2014 to 2018, Muratov was the chief specialist, then head of the Department of Architecture, Urban Planning, and Construction of the Beskaragay District.

Starting from 2018 and until 6 October 2022, he served as Deputy Akim of Jarma District. After that, he was appointed as the Äkim of Beskaragay District.

On 23 December 2024, Muratov was appointed as the Äkim of Semey.

On 18 August 2025, the Äkim of Abai Region officially accepted Muratov's resignation from the position of Semey Äkim. This became known only on 29 August. Muratov is the last Äkim to be appointed and not elected in Semey history.
