= Balyktykol (Abai Region) =

Lake in Kazakhstan

- Балықтыкөл
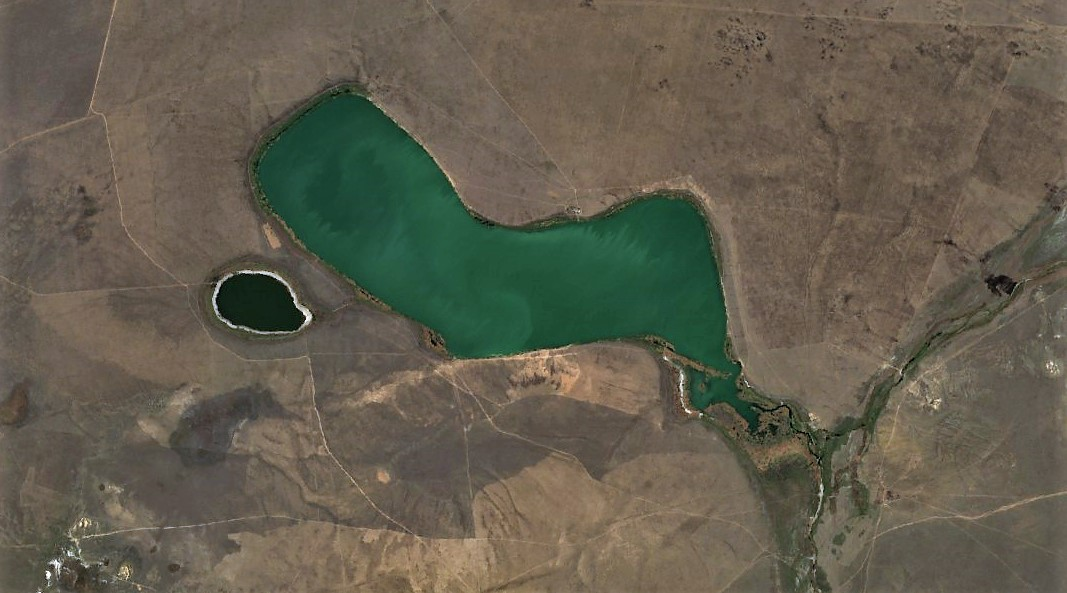
- Sentinel-2 image of the lake

- Location within Kazakhstan
- Location: Abai Region
- Coordinates: 50°21′54″N 79°10′45″E
- Basin countries: Kazakhstan
- Max. length: 6.2 km (3.9 mi)
- Max. width: 1.7 km (1.1 mi)
- Surface area: 9.2 km^{2} (3.6 sq mi)
- Residence time: UTC+6

Balyktykol (Kazakh: Балықтыкөл; Russian: Балыктыколь) is a lake in Zhanasemey District, Abai Region, Kazakhstan.

The lake is located 72 km (45 mi) to the west of Semey city, former Semipalatinsk.

== Geography ==
Balyktykol is a lake in eastern Kazakhstan. It is elongated, with a bend in the middle. The northern section is aligned from northwest to southeast, while the eastern is aligned from east to west. A tributary of the Shagan flows into Balyktykol from the southeast into the southeastern end. The lake lies about 25 km (16 mi) to the south of the Irtysh and 3.5 km (2.2 mi) to the north of lake Karabastuz. Close to the southwest of the western shore there is a small round lake and 12 km (7.5 mi) to the south lies lake Shuga.

The water of Balyktykol is saline. The lake surface freezes in the middle of November and thaws by the first decade of April.

== See also ==
- List of lakes of Kazakhstan
