= Tarbagatay District =

Tarbagatay Тарбағатай
- District
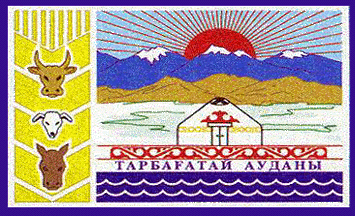
- Flag

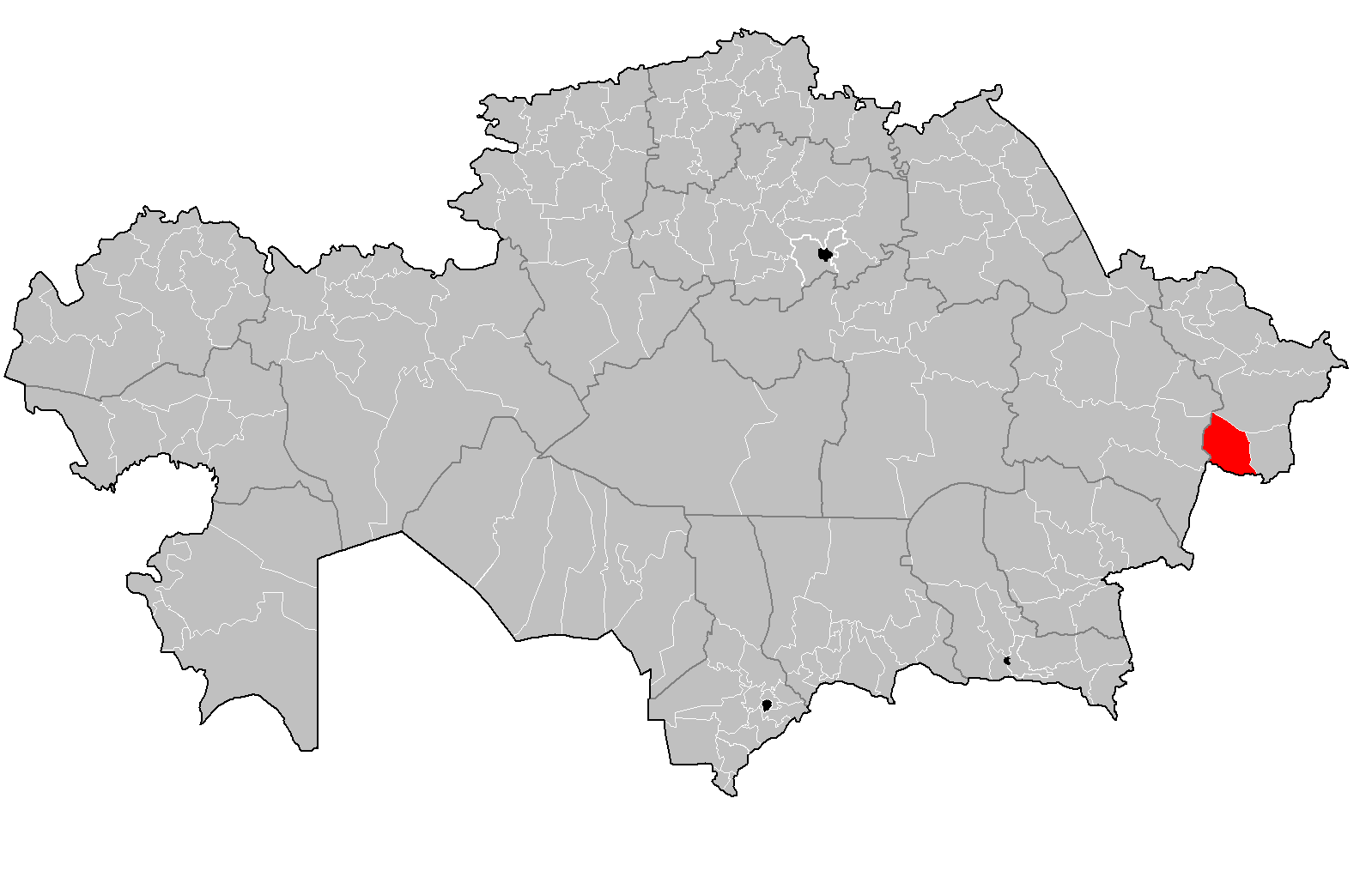
- Country: Kazakhstan
- Region: East Kazakhstan Region
- Administrative center: Akzhar
- Founded: 1928

Government
  - Akim: Smailov Askhat Saidakhmetovich

Area
  - Total: 9,200 sq mi (23,700 km^{2})

Population (2019)
  - Total: 38,852
- Time zone: UTC+6 (East)

Tarbagatay (Kazakh: Тарбағатай ауданы, Tarbağatai audany) is a district of East Kazakhstan Region, Kazakhstan. The administrative center of the district is the village of Akzhar. The population is: 44,147 (2013 estimate); 47,125 (2009 census results); 65,589 (1999 census results).

== History ==
The administrative center of Tarbagatay District of East Kazakhstan Region was Aksuat until 2022, when the Aksuat District of Abai Region was established.

== Climate ==
The climate in Tarbagatay is very continental. Winters are cold (in January average temperature −22 °С, −30 °С) and summers are hot (in July average temperature +25 °С, +35 °С). Precipitation is low (200–300 mm/year) and occurs mostly in winter.

== Toponym ==
The name Tarbagatay is derived from Mongolian and literally means "having marmots" (specifically the Tarbagan marmot). However, tagh ~ taw ~ tay may be misinterpreted as meaning "mountain" by speakers of Turkic languages, such as the Kazakh language.

== Administrative-territorial system ==
Tarbagatay District has 17 rural districts and 65 villages.

== Demographics ==
Ethnic groups (2009):

- Kazakh 98.7%
- Russian 1.1%
- Tatar 0.1%
- German 0.1%
- Others : 0.1%

== Economy ==
Tarbagatay's economy is agricultural, centered around the production of meat, fish, flour, and bread. The district's GDP is 503.9 million tenge, or roughly $3.4 million USD (2008).

== Sights ==
- Borytastagan
- Syn-tas
- Atyn oba
- Alty oba
