= Shuga (lake) =

Lake in Kazakhstan

- Шұға
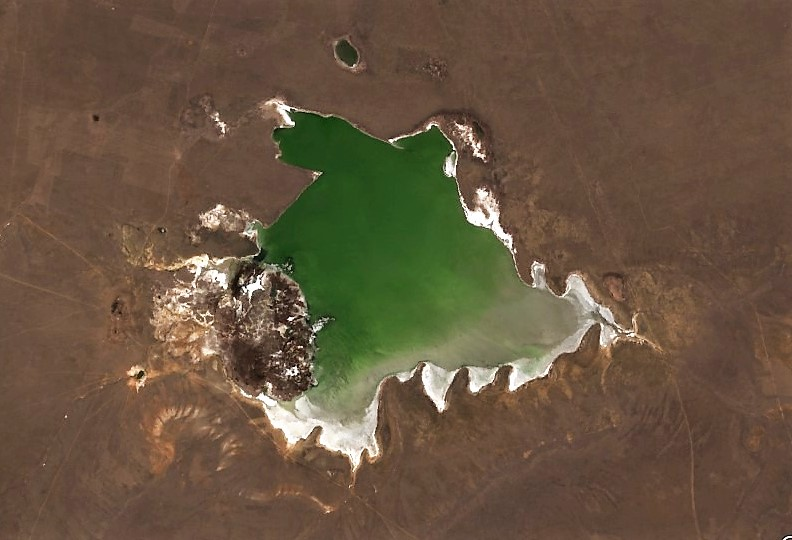
- Sentinel-2 image of the lake

- Location within Kazakhstan
- Location: Abai Region
- Coordinates: 50°13′13″N 79°10′28″E
- Catchment area: 311 km^{2} (120 sq mi)
- Basin countries: Kazakhstan
- Max. length: 5.2 km (3.2 mi)
- Max. width: 36 km (22 mi)
- Surface area: 11.2 km^{2} (4.3 sq mi)
- Residence time: UTC+6
- Surface elevation: 235.5 m (773 ft)

Shuga (Kazakh: Шұға; Russian: Шуга) is a salt lake in Zhanasemey District, Abai Region, Kazakhstan.

The lake is located 73 km (45 mi) to the west of Semey city, former Semipalatinsk. The area surrounding the lake is used as pasture for local cattle.

== Geography ==
Shuga is an endorheic lake in the Shagan river basin. The northeastern and southeastern shores are indented, with sandy bays in some places. The lake lies about 37 km (23 mi) to the south of the Irtysh and 6 km (3.7 mi) to the south of lake Karabastuz. 31 km (19 mi) to the south lies lake Shagan with its nuclear pothole.

The water of lake Shuga is saline. The bottom is flat and has a 0.4 m (1 ft 4 in) thick layer of mud. The lake fills with snow and rainwater. Its level rises in spring and falls in the summer and autumn months. In dry years, it dries up and turns into a sor. The lake surface rarely freezes completely in the winter owing to its high salinity, but parts of it have ice between the end of November and the second half of April, when the lake is surrounded by snow.

== Flora ==
Steppe vegetation grows in the area surrounding the lake, made up of mainly wormwood, Kochia and, more rarely, Achnatherum. There are no reeds along the shoreline and no aquatic plants in the water.

== See also ==
- List of lakes of Kazakhstan
