= Nurlan Uranhaev =

Kazakh politician

- Нұрлан Ұранхаев
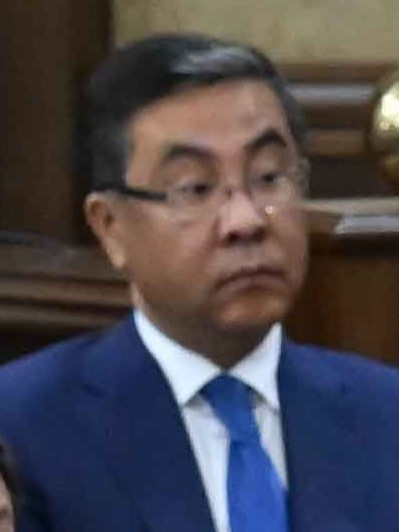
- Uranhaev in 2023

Äkim of Abai Region
- In office 11 June 2022 – 14 February 2025
- Preceded by: Position established
- Succeeded by: Berik Uali

Personal details
- Born: 4 May 1965 (age 61) Semey, East Kazakhstan Region, Kazakh SSR, Soviet Union
- Party: Independent
- Education: D. Serikbayev East Kazakhstan Technical University

Nūrlan Telmanūly Ūranhaev (Kazakh: Нұрлан Телманұлы Ұранхаев; born 4 May 1965) is a Kazakh economist and politician who served as the first Äkim of the Abai Region from 11 June 2022 to 14 February 2025.
