= Kokpekti District =

Coordinates: 48°45′27″N 82°22′54″E

Kokpekti
- District
- Көкпекті ауданы
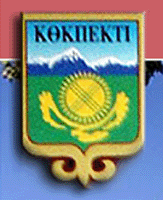
- Coat of arms

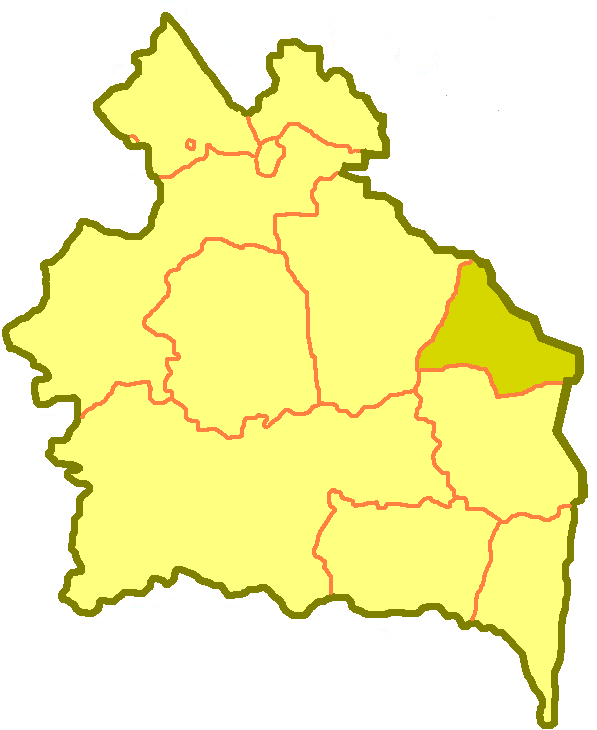
- Country: Kazakhstan
- Region: Abai Region
- Administrative center: Kokpekti
- Founded: 1930

Government
  - Akim: Adlet Kozhanbaev

Area
  - Total: 3,500 sq mi (9,100 km^{2})

Population (2023)
  - Total: 13,636
- Time zone: UTC+6 (East)
- Website: http://www.kokpekti.vko.gov.kz/ru/

Kokpekti (Kazakh: Көкпекті ауданы, romanized: Kökpektı audany) is a district of the Abai Region in eastern Kazakhstan. The administrative center of the district is the village of Kokpekti.

== History ==
Through a Decree of the President of the Republic of Kazakhstan, Samar District of East Kazakhstan Region was established in May 2022. The area of the village of Samar, its administrative center, was segregated from Kokpekti District.

== Geography ==
The district borders on Zharma District in the west, Aksuat District in the south, and Ulan District, Samar District and Kurshim District in the north and east.

The relief of the territory of the district is mainly hilly, in the north - mountainous (Kalbinsky ridge), in the south - the northern part basins of Lake Zaisan. The highest point of the region is Mount Karazhal (1,606 m).
