= Aqzhar =

- Location in Kazakhstan
- Coordinates: 46°0′48″N 77°11′8″E
- Country: Kazakhstan
- Region: Jetisu Region
- District: Karatal District
- Time zone: UTC+6 (Omsk Time)

Aqzhar is a village in Jetisu Region of south-eastern Kazakhstan.

== Climate ==
Climate data for Aqzhar (1991–2020)
Month	Jan	Feb	Mar	Apr	May	Jun	Jul	Aug	Sep	Oct	Nov	Dec	Year
Mean daily maximum °C (°F)	−12.5 (9.5)	−9.0 (15.8)	−0.4 (31.3)	14.4 (57.9)	21.4 (70.5)	27.0 (80.6)	28.9 (84.0)	27.5 (81.5)	20.9 (69.6)	12.1 (53.8)	−0.2 (31.6)	−9.1 (15.6)	10.1 (50.2)
Daily mean °C (°F)	−17.7 (0.1)	−14.7 (5.5)	−5.8 (21.6)	7.9 (46.2)	14.6 (58.3)	20.3 (68.5)	22.1 (71.8)	20.5 (68.9)	13.9 (57.0)	5.7 (42.3)	−5.3 (22.5)	−14.0 (6.8)	4.0 (39.2)
Mean daily minimum °C (°F)	−22.5 (−8.5)	−19.8 (−3.6)	−10.7 (12.7)	1.9 (35.4)	7.9 (46.2)	13.7 (56.7)	15.7 (60.3)	13.9 (57.0)	7.4 (45.3)	0.6 (33.1)	−9.6 (14.7)	−18.6 (−1.5)	−1.7 (28.9)
Average precipitation mm (inches)	11.5 (0.45)	9.4 (0.37)	12.3 (0.48)	19.8 (0.78)	25.5 (1.00)	31.2 (1.23)	34.9 (1.37)	22.5 (0.89)	17.1 (0.67)	17.8 (0.70)	19.9 (0.78)	14.2 (0.56)	236.1 (9.30)
Average precipitation days (≥ 1.0 mm)	3.4	2.8	3.1	4.6	4.7	5.5	6.9	4.9	4.1	4.0	4.6	3.7	52.3
Source: NOAA
