= Zhanasemey District =

Coordinates: 50°24′N 80°13′E

- District
- Жаңасемей ауданы
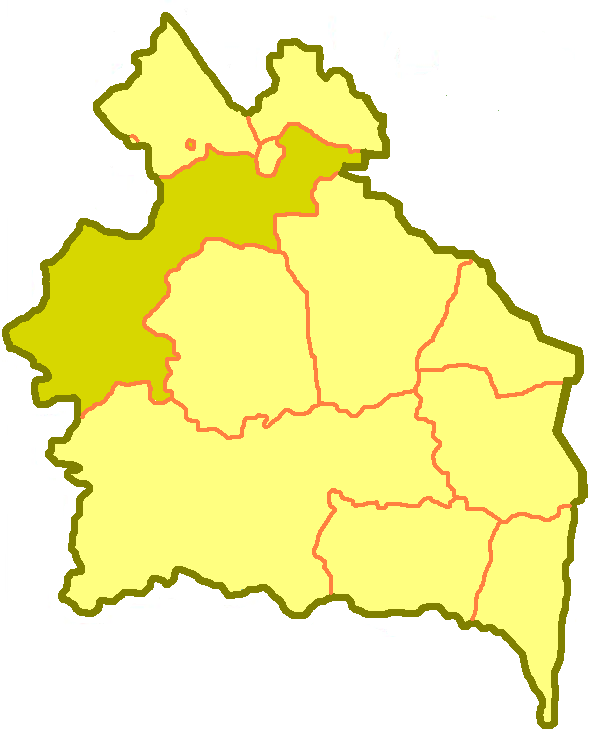
- Map of the district
- Interactive map of Zhanasemey District
- Country: Kazakhstan
- Region: Abai Region
- Administrative center: Semey
- Re-established: 2024

Area
  - Total: 27,100 km^{2} (10,500 sq mi)

Population (2021)
  - Total: 20,868
- Time zone: UTC+6 (East)

Zhanasemey District (Kazakh: Жаңасемей ауданы, Russian: Жанасемейский район) is a district of Abai Region in eastern Kazakhstan. The administrative center is Semey city, although it is not part of the district.

== History ==
The Zhanasemey District was first established in 1928, at the time of the Kazakh Autonomous Socialist Soviet Republic, It was part of the Semipalatinsk Oblast but after only two years it was abolished. In 1938 the district was restored as part of the East Kazakhstan Region of the Kazakh Soviet Socialist Republic and, with some restructuring in between, it lasted until 1957. Again, in 1966 Zhanasemey District was reinstated, lasting three decades until 1996, five years after the independence from the USSR when the district was terminated. Finally, through a decree of the President of the Republic of Kazakhstan dated 28 December 2023, Zhanasemey District was re-established for the fourth time beginning on 1 January 2024.

== Geography ==
Rivers Shagan and Saryozen, as well as lakes Shuga, Balyktykol and Shagan are located in the district. The Degelen and Myrzhyk mountains rise in the western sector and are part of the Kazakh Uplands.

== See also ==
- Semipalatinsk Test Site
