= Borodulikha =

Borodulikha Бородулиха
- Location in Kazakhstan
- Coordinates: 50°42′52″N 80°55′57″E
- Country: Kazakhstan
- Region: Abai Region
- District: Borodulikha District
- Rural District: Borodulikha Rural District

Population (2021)
  - Total: 5,912
- Time zone: UTC+6

Borodulikha (Kazakh: Бородулиха; Russian: Бородулиха) is a village in and the administrative centre of Borodulikha District, Abai Region, Kazakhstan. It is the also administrative center of the Borodulikha Rural District (KATO code — 633830100).

== Geography ==
Borodulikha is located 52 kilometers (32 mi) northeast from the regional centre Semey, and the nearest railway is 25 kilometers (16 mi) east of Belgash railway station. It is situated on the southern shore of Lake Bolshoye.

== History ==
The village of Borodulikha was founded in the second half of the 19th century. Administratively, Borodulikha belonged to the Zmeinogorsk district of Tomsk province and was a volost center. However, economically, the village gravitated more toward Semipalatinsk than Zmeinogorsk.

In 1944, the Borodulikha District was organized with its center in the village of Borodulikha.

== Demographics ==
In 1999, the population of the village of Borodulikha was 6,122 people (2,991 men and 3,131 women). According to the 2009 census, 5,226 people lived in the village (2,465 men and 2,761 women).

At the beginning of 2019, the population of Borodulikha was 4,434 people (2,103 men and 2,331 women). As of 2021, the village had a population of 5,912.
