= Urzhar District =

Coordinates: 47°05′34″N 81°37′40″E

Ürjar
- District
- Үржар ауданы
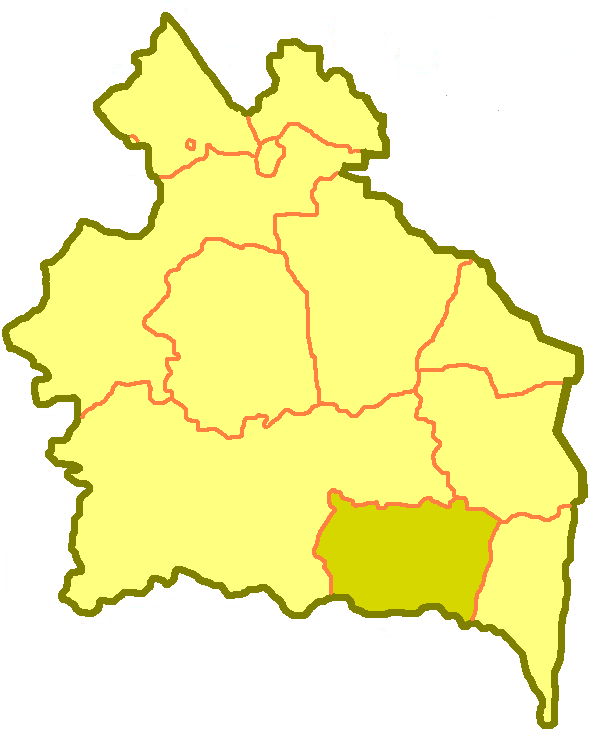
- Country: Kazakhstan
- Region: Abai Region
- Administrative center: Úrjar
- Founded: 1928

Government
  - Akim: Tokseitov Nurzhan Tleuzhanovich

Area
  - Total: 23,400 km^{2} (9,000 sq mi)

Population (2013)
  - Total: 83,174
- Time zone: UTC+05:00 (Kazakhstan Time)

Ürjar District (Kazakh: Үржар ауданы) is a district of Abai Region in eastern Kazakhstan, near the border with China. The administrative center of the district is the selo of Ürjar. Population: 81,008 (2013 estimate); 83,174 (2009 census results); 95,312 (1999 census results).

== History ==
=== Ancient History ===
A stone sarcophagus was found in the region in the year 2013, revealing the remains of a woman which was most likely part of a local ruling family and that presumably lived in the 4th-3rd centuries BC within the area.

=== Under the Russian Empire ===
The area started to be administrated and settled in an official manner between 1905 and 1915.

=== Under the Soviet Union ===
The Soviets of Workers' and Soldiers' Deputies first arrived in Urzhar in 1918, during the Russian Civil War, however the area was heavily disputed up until 1920 by the forces of the Russian "White Army". After this date, the Soviet Union solidified its control over the area.

Ürjar District was first established in 1928, at the time of the Kazakh Autonomous Socialist Soviet Republic, It was part of the Semipalatinsk Region.

=== Under Kazakhstan ===
In 1997, six years after the independence from the USSR, the Semipalatinsk Region was abolished and Ürjar District became part of the East Kazakhstan Region. At the same time the territory of the abolished Makanshi District was included in Ürjar District. On 1 January 2024, the Makanshi District was re-established through a decree of the President of the Republic of Kazakhstan and the eastern sector of Ürjar District was segregated to form the new district.

In 2012, 51 projects were implemented, with a total amount of 1,609,067.8 thousands tenge being spent on such projects.
