= Stanislav Kurilov =

Soviet, Canadian, and Israeli oceanographer (1936–1998)

Stanislav Kurilov

Stanislav Vasilyevich 'Slava' Kurilov (Russian: Станислав Васильевич Курилов; July 17, 1936 – January 29, 1998) was a Soviet, Canadian and Israeli oceanographer. He escaped from the Soviet Union by jumping overboard from a cruise liner in the open ocean and swimming to the Philippines.

== Biography ==
=== Early life ===
Stanislav Kurilov was born in 1936 in Vladikavkaz, then known as Ordzhonikidze. He grew up in Semipalatinsk, in Soviet Kazakhstan. As a young child, he learned to swim in secret from his own parents, who forbade him to enter open water. At the age of 10, on a dare, he swam across the Irtysh. Many years later, in one of his later stories, he described the negative environmental and public health effects of the nuclear test site that was constructed near the city during his teenage years.

From his early years, Kurilov dreamed of a life of sailing the seas. However, doctors told him that due to a vision problem he would not be eligible for either a Soviet Navy or merchant marine career. After doing his military service, as a chemical warfare instructor of a sapper battalion, he graduated from the Leningrad Meteorology Institute (ru) as an oceanographer. While a student, he learned scuba diving. Later, he became interested in yoga and meditation.

Kurilov worked at the Institute of Oceanology of the USSR Academy of Sciences, and at the Marine Biology Institute in Vladivostok. Even though the Soviet Union operated a large number of research vessels on a worldwide scale, the authorities decided that Kurilov was not eligible for any overseas expeditions, either because of him learning about chemical warfare during his military service, because his father had been a prisoner of war during World War II, or because of Kurilov's "foreign connection": his sister had married an Indian citizen and immigrated to India, and later to Canada. Kurilov's field work, therefore, was restricted to the Soviet Union's coastal waters, such as the Black Sea and Sea of Japan. In particular, he worked at Soviet underwater research stations in the Black Sea.

Kurilov came to resent the Soviet state even more when, starting in 1970, two of his team's joint underwater projects with Jacques-Yves Cousteau fell through, one after the other, because he was refused a passport. Instead, the Soviets sent another group, "without diving experience, but with [exit] visas", with whom Cousteau refused to work.

=== The defection ===
In December 1974, Kurilov boarded Soviet cruise liner Sovetsky Soyuz, leaving for a tour advertised as a "Cruise from the winter into the summer". It was a popular "cruise to nowhere", where a ship would depart Vladivostok in the Far East, sail south toward the equator through the Pacific Ocean, and come back without entering any foreign ports. Because of the absence of port calls, the trip required neither passport nor visas. It was known that the ship would pass within view of several foreign countries. After studying its planned route, Kurilov decided that the best chance for an escape would be in the Philippine Sea, off the coast of Siargao Island.

After sunset on December 13, in stormy weather, Kurilov jumped overboard from the stern of the cruise ship, with a snorkeling mask and fins. Luckily, he was neither immediately noticed by the crew, or struck by the ship's propeller. Because of the strong currents, it took him three nights and two days to reach the land. In his own memoir, he recalls reaching the Philippine shore on his own, by swimming all the way.

According to an Associated Press report, based on information released by the Philippine authorities, published a few days later, he had been found by a local fisherman "clinging to a drifting fishing boat". After about six months of investigation, first in Cagayan de Oro, later in Manila (the Philippine authorities may have suspected him to be a Soviet spy), Kurilov was able to leave for Canada.

=== Life in the West ===
Kurilov spent over 10 years in Canada, during which time he traveled extensively. Although not Jewish, in 1986 he moved to Israel, where he married an Israeli citizen (Lena Gendelev; after marriage, Gendelev-Kurilov) and became employed at the Israel Oceanographic and Limnological Research institute in Haifa.

He wrote the story of his escape, as well as a number of other stories. They have been published in Russian, Hebrew and partial English translations.

Stanislav Kurilov died in a diving accident on Lake Kinneret. He was buried in the Alliance Church International Cemetery in Jerusalem's German Colony neighborhood.

== Other similar escapes ==
Although Stanislav Kurilov's method of escape is remarkable, it is not unique. In his study of defections from the Soviet Union, Vladislav Krasnov mentions at least two other similar escapes from a Soviet cruise ship on a "cruise to nowhere" in Southeast Asia, Yuri Vetokhin and Liliana Gasinskaya.

An unnamed member of the biology faculty at Moscow University, who was 26 at the time, escaped from another Soviet cruise liner (MV Rus) off the Philippines, in a rubber raft. He was picked by Filipino fishermen.

Yuri Vetokhin, a former computer programmer from Leningrad, escaped in a similar way to Indonesia in December 1979. He later gave an account of his escape, as well as of two previous, failed, escape attempts on the Black Sea, in his memoir.

== In culture ==
In 2017, the Ukrainian music band Antytila published a music video of the song "TDME" dedicated to Kurilov.
