= Borodulikha District =

Coordinates: 50°42′52″N 80°55′50″E

Borodulikha
- District
- Бородулиха ауданы
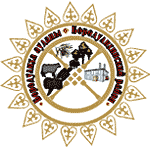
- Coat of arms

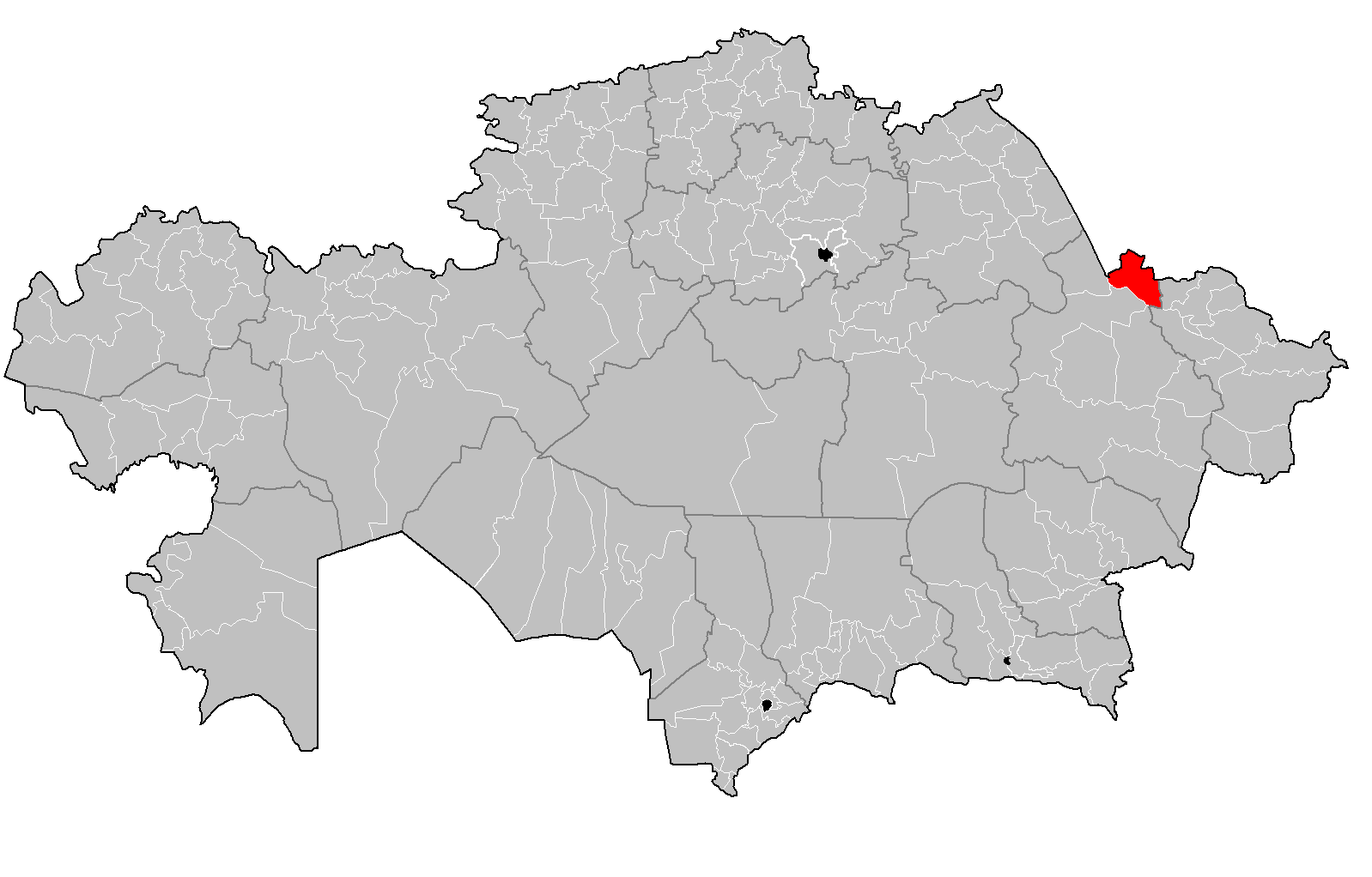
- Country: Kazakhstan
- Region: Abai Region
- Administrative center: Borodulikha
- Founded: 1944

Government
  - Akim: Aidar Ibrayev

Area
  - Total: 2,800 sq mi (7,200 km^{2})

Population (2013)
  - Total: 37,864
- Time zone: UTC+6 (East)

Borodulikha (Kazakh: Бородулиха ауданы, Boroduliha audany) is a district of Abai Region in eastern Kazakhstan. The administrative center of the district is the village of Borodulikha. Population: 37,864 (2013 estimate); 40,167 (2009 census results); 49,122 (1999 census results).
