= Berik Uali =

Kazakh politician (born 1977)

- Берік Уәли
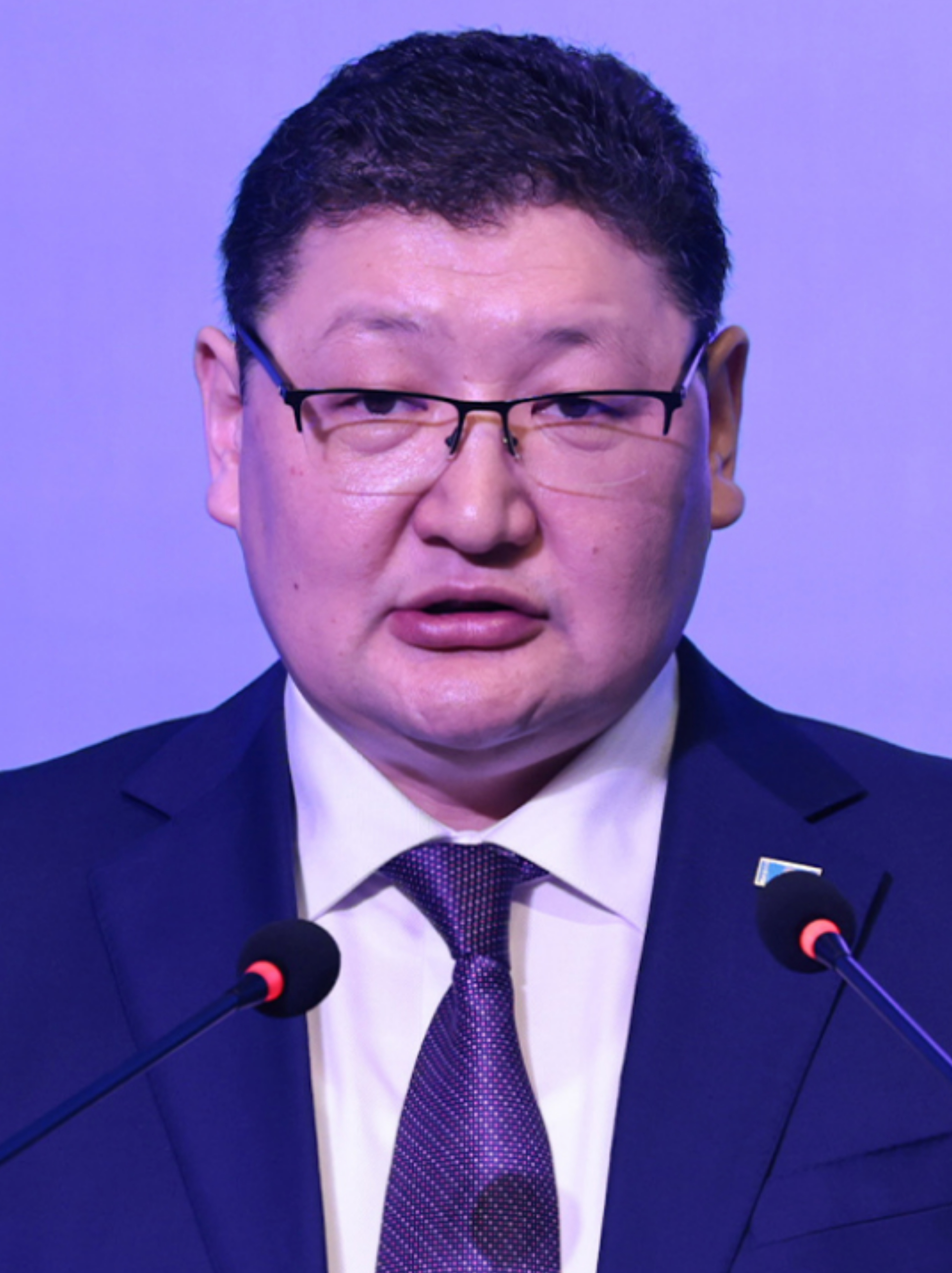
- Uali in 2025

Äkim of Abai Region
- Incumbent
- Assumed office 17 February 2025
- President: Kassym-Jomart Tokayev
- Preceded by: Nurlan Uranhaev

Aqorda Press Secretary
- In office 12 September 2023 – 17 February 2025
- President: Kassym-Jomart Tokayev
- Preceded by: Nurmuhamed Baigaraev
- Succeeded by: Ruslan Jeldibai
- In office 22 March 2019 – 29 March 2022
- President: Kassym-Jomart Tokayev
- Preceded by: Aidos Ukibay
- Succeeded by: Ruslan Jeldibai

Advisor to the President
- In office 12 September 2023 – 17 February 2025
- President: Kassym-Jomart Tokayev

Personal details
- Born: Berik Ualievich Kurmangali; 4 January 1977 (age 49) Oishilik, Aksuat District, Semipalatinsk Oblast, Kazakh SSR, Soviet Union
- Party: Amanat
- Children: 5
- Education: Kazakh State Institute of Theatre and Cinema; Kazakh National University; Kazakh Humanitarian and Legal Innovative University
- Awards: Order of Kurmet; Order of Parasat

Berik Ualiūly Uali (Note: Often transliterated as Berik Ualiuly Uali through a Russified Romanization of Берик Уалиулы Уали.) (Kazakh: Берік Уәлиұлы Уәли) (born Berik Ualievich Kurmangali, Kazakh: Берік Уәлиұлы Құрманғали; 4 January 1977) is a Kazakh journalist and politician, who is serving as äkim of Abai Region since 2025. He previously served twice as President Kassym-Jomart Tokayev's press secretary, from 2019 to 2022 and 2023 to 2025.

== Early life and education ==
Berik Kurmangali was born on 4 January 1977, in Oishilik, a village in Aksuat District, Semipalatinsk Region (now Abai Region), Kazakh Soviet Socialist Republic, Soviet Union.

Berik was born with the surname Kurmangali. In 2011, when he received the Daryn award, official records listed his surname as Kurmangali, but by 2015, in the decree appointing him to a position within the Nur Otan party, his surname appeared as Uali. In 2019, however, the decree naming him press pecretary to president Tokayev again used Kurmangali. Currently he uses the surname Uali, taken from his father's given name.

He graduated from the Kazakh State Institute of Theatre and Cinema with a degree in film studies in 1997. He subsequently attended a master's program at Kazakh National University, earning a degree in journalism in 2005, and obtained a law degree from the Kazakh Humanitarian and Legal Innovative University in 2014.

== Early career ==
After graduating from the Kazakh State Institute of Theatre and Cinema in 1997, he joined the TV company Tañ as a reporter for the news program “Almaty News.”

In 1998 he moved to NTV as a producing editor for its news program.

In 2000 he joined the 31 Channel broadcasting company, initially as chief editor of the news program Informbyuro. From 2000 until 2007 he served as author-presenter of the program “Erkin söz” and as chief editor and host of the political talk show “Doda”.

In 2007 he transferred to the Khabar Agency, which at the time was effectively controlled by Dariga Nazarbayeva, the elder daughter of president Nursultan Nazarbayev. He remained at Khabar until 2012, working as a correspondent in the news service of the information programs directorate and as presenter of the program “Betpe-bet”.

While at Khabar, in 2009 he became head of the Anti-Corruption Media Centre of Nur-Media LLP, affiliated with the Nur Otan party (now Amanat).

He left that posts in 2012 and, in October of the same year, relocated to South Kazakhstan Region to lead the regional press service; he also served concurrently as deputy head of the regional akim's office. He then headed the Department of Internal Policy and Religious Affairs until August 2015.

On 24 August 2015 he was appointed adviser to Askar Myrzakhmetov, the first deputy chair of the Nur Otan party.

In August 2016 he joined the Ministry of Investment and Development, first as an adviser to the minister and concurrently head of Public Relations Department, and later as head of the Department of Information Support within the ministry.

In June 2018 he moved to Jambyl Region to serve as head of its Department of Internal Policy.

== Political career ==
After the resignation of president Nazarbayev and the transfer of the presidency to Tokayev, Uali became Tokayev's first press secretary on 22 March 2019. On 14 February 2022, at the board of directors meeting of the Qazaqstan Radio and Television Corporation, he was elected as its chairman of the board of directors.

Two weeks later, on March 29, he was relieved of his post as press secretary and appointed as the chairman of the Khabar Agency.

On 12 September 2023, he returned to his former position as press secretary and, concurrently, became Tokayev's adviser.

On 17 February 2025, he was relieved of his post. On the same day, prime minister Oljas Bektenov, in the Abai Region, presented president Tokayev’s proposal to consider the candidacies of Uali and akim of the city of Kurchatov Bolat Abdraliev for the position of äkim (governor) of the region. A total of 102 out of 126 deputies of maslikhats at all levels in the region voted for Uali, while 24 deputies supported Abdraliev and by Tokayev's No. 791, Uali was appointed to the post.

== Personal life ==
Uali is married and has 5 children.

== Awards ==
- State Youth Prize "Daryn" (2011)
- Order of Kurmet (2019)
- Order of Parasat (2024)
- Gratitude of the president of Kazakhstan (2021)
- Badge "For Perfect Service" (2022)
