= Aksuat =

Aksuat Ақсуат
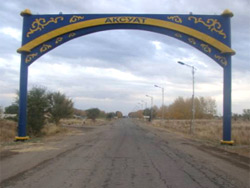

- Location within Kazakhstan
- Coordinates: 47°45′43.95″N 82°48′5.85″E
- Country: Kazakhstan
- Region: Abai Region
- District: Aksuat District

Government
  - Type: Akimat
  - Akim: Uvaliyev Toktar
- Elevation: 1,781 ft (543 m)
- Time zone: UTC+6 (+6)
- Post code: 071500 -071515
- Area code: +7 72346
- Website: tarbagatay.vko.gov.kz

Aksuat (/ˌɑːksuˈɑːt/; Kazakh: Ақсуат / Aqsuat [ɑqsʊˈwɑt]; Russian: Аксуат, IPA: [əksʊˈat]) is a village in Aksuat District, Abai Region, Kazakhstan. It is the administrative center of the district. It had a population of 6,126 (2009 census results); 7,503 (1999 census results).

== Toponymy ==
The name Aksuat derives from two Kazakh words: ақ (aq) "white" and суат (sýat) "pond".

== History ==
Aksuat was part of Tarbagatay District of East Kazakhstan Region until 2022, when the Aksuat District of Abai Region was established.

== Climate ==
Extreme continental. Winter is cold (in January average temperature – 22°С, – 30°С) and summer is hot (in July average temperature + 25°С, + 35°С). Very poor precipitation (200 – 300 mm/year) mostly in the winter season.

Climate data for Aksuat (1991–2020)
Month	Jan	Feb	Mar	Apr	May	Jun	Jul	Aug	Sep	Oct	Nov	Dec	Year
Mean daily maximum °C (°F)	−13.1 (8.4)	−9.3 (15.3)	−0.2 (31.6)	15.5 (59.9)	22.7 (72.9)	27.9 (82.2)	29.4 (84.9)	28.3 (82.9)	21.8 (71.2)	12.9 (55.2)	0.0 (32.0)	−9.4 (15.1)	10.5 (50.9)
Daily mean °C (°F)	−18.4 (−1.1)	−15.2 (4.6)	−6.0 (21.2)	8.0 (46.4)	15.1 (59.2)	20.6 (69.1)	22.1 (71.8)	20.6 (69.1)	13.8 (56.8)	5.4 (41.7)	−5.6 (21.9)	−14.5 (5.9)	3.8 (38.8)
Mean daily minimum °C (°F)	−23.0 (−9.4)	−20.3 (−4.5)	−11.1 (12.0)	1.2 (34.2)	7.7 (45.9)	13.5 (56.3)	15.4 (59.7)	13.4 (56.1)	6.6 (43.9)	−0.8 (30.6)	−10.0 (14.0)	−18.9 (−2.0)	−2.2 (28.0)
Average precipitation mm (inches)	9.9 (0.39)	7.5 (0.30)	10.3 (0.41)	14.1 (0.56)	22.0 (0.87)	33.3 (1.31)	39.5 (1.56)	20.4 (0.80)	14.2 (0.56)	14.7 (0.58)	15.2 (0.60)	13.1 (0.52)	214.2 (8.43)
Average precipitation days (≥ 1.0 mm)	3.2	2.9	3.1	3.5	4.9	5.6	7.0	4.3	3.3	3.7	4.2	3.8	49.5
Source: NOAA
