= Kazakhstan–Korea Friendship Park =

Historic site in Ushtobe, Kazakhstan

Friendship Park of the Republic of Kazakhstan and the Republic of Korea
- Location: Bastobe Hill, Ushtobe, Kazakhstan
- Coordinates: 45.30321°N 78.03921°E
- Status: Under construction

The Friendship Park of the Republic of Kazakhstan and the Republic of Korea (Russian: Парк дружбы Республики Казахстан и Республики Корея, romanized: Park druzhby Respubliki Kazakhstan i Respubliki Koreya; Korean: 한국–카자흐스탄 우호기념공원) or Kazakhstan–Korea Friendship Park (Парка дружбы Казахстан – Корея, Parka druzhby Kazakhstan – Koreya) is a park currently under construction on Bastobe Hill, Ushtobe, Kazakhstan.

== Background ==
Bastobe Hill stands as the location where the first Korean community settled in Kazakhstan, holding particular historical importance for the ethnic Korean Kazakhs, collectively identified as Koryo-saram. In 1937, some 170,000 ethnic Koreans were subjected to forced relocation from the Russian Far East to Central Asia as part of Stalin's ethnic cleansing policies. The initial settlers in Kazakhstan found themselves without support from the Soviet government as they tried to establish new lives. After walking an additional 7 km (4.3 mi) from the drop-off point, they reached Bashtobe Hill in October 1937. They reportedly dug shelters out of the frozen ground with their bare hands in order to survive the cold, as temperatures could drop to −40 °C (−40 °F). Around 20,000 died in these conditions. Upon their arrival, they were assisted by local Kazakh people, and the ethnic Koreans and the local Kazakhs fostered a strong sense of camaraderie. Within two years, the community established 20 collective farms.

== Development ==
=== Earlier monuments ===
In May 2002, a memorial was installed on the hill. It is written in Korean using Hangul, and reads: (Note: 『이곳은 원동에서 강제이주된 고려인들이 1937년 10월 9일부터 1938년 4월 10일 까지 토굴을 짓고 살았던 초기 정착지이다』)

Koreans, who were forcibly moved from the Russian Far East, first settled and lived here in burrows from 9 October 1937 to 10 April 1938.

In 2012, the Korean Association of Kazakhstan installed a memorial that commemorated the location and expressed gratitude toward the Kazakh people for their assistance. Graves from early communities in the area are scattered around the hill, numbering in the hundreds. Many headstones are written in Hangul.

=== Creation ===
In May 2018, the Korean Association of Kazakhstan, the Reunification Culture Research Center (Korean: 통일문화연구원), and the Chung-Ang University Health Care System Hyundai Hospital reached an agreement to create the park. The groundbreaking ceremony was held on 26 July 2019. Restoration work also began on the various monuments and tombs on the hill. At the ceremony, another monument was revealed, which reads "同族如天" (Hanja; in Hangul "동족여천"), meaning "serve (your) compatriots like heaven." Construction was delayed by the COVID-19 pandemic. In 2021, a monument was installed in the name of the President of Kazakhstan, thanking the Korean people for their relationship with Kazakhstan.

In 2022, a monument wall was created, dedicated to fifteen Koryo-saram Korean independence activists, including Hong Beom-do, Yi Dong-hwi, and Choe Jae-hyeong. Various descendents of those commemorated on the wall attended the ceremony.

Some of the original burrows are now left as depressions in the ground. Some of them have known functions, including one that functioned as a mess hall. A memorial service is held on the hill every year on March 1.

== See also ==
- Karatal Korean History Center – a history museum in Ushtobe that is often visited alongside the park
