= Ushtobe =

Ushtobe Үштөбе
- Town
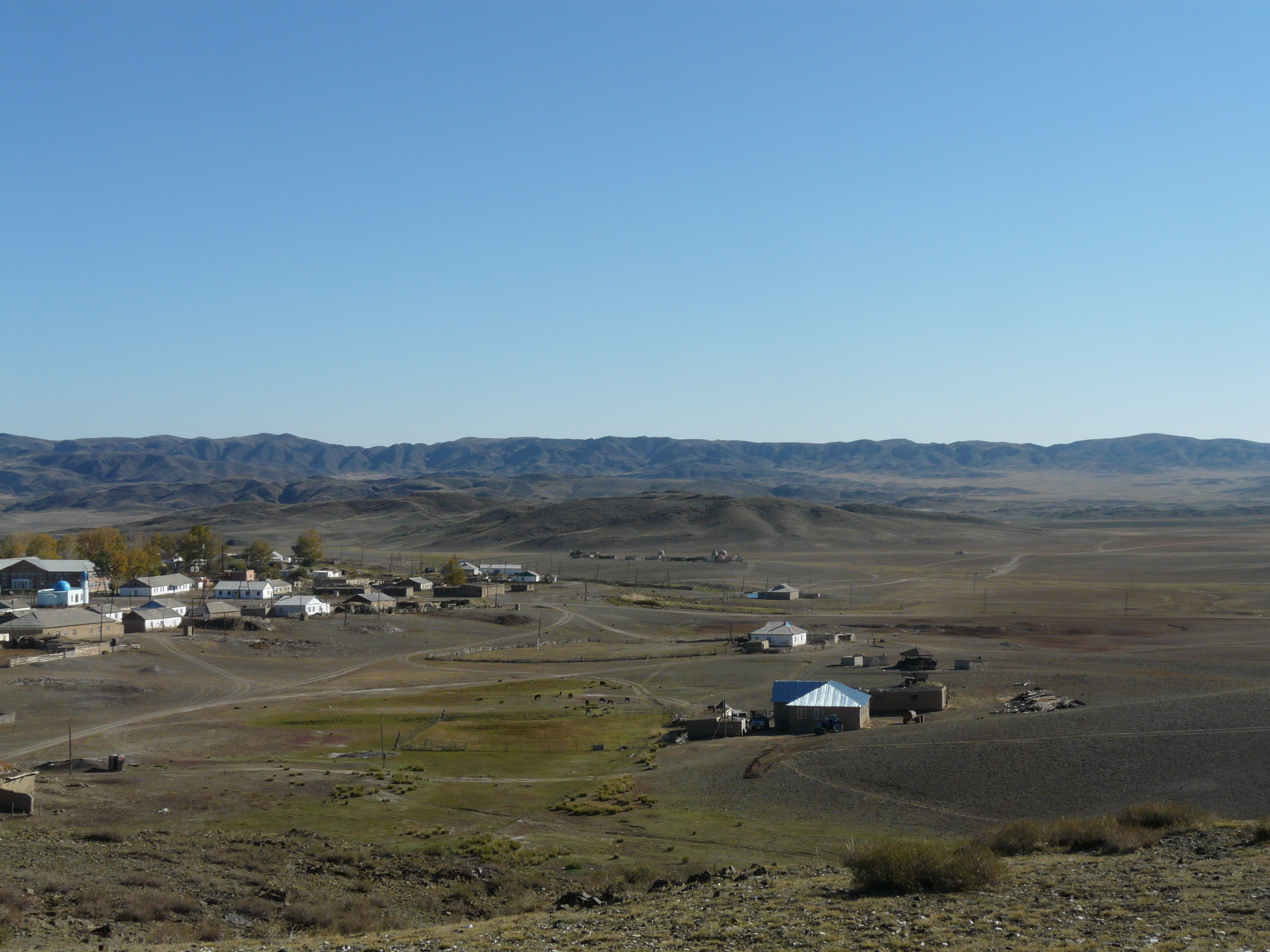

- Location in Kazakhstan
- Coordinates: 45°14′32″N 77°58′56″E
- Country: Kazakhstan
- Region: Jetisu Region
- District: Karatal District

Population (2009)
  - Total: 24,895
- Time zone: UTC+6 (Omsk Time)
- Postal code: 041000
- Area code: 72834

Ushtobe (Kazakh: Үштөбе, Üştöbe) is a town and seat of Karatal District in the Jetisu Region of south-eastern Kazakhstan. Population: 24,895 (2009 census results); 22,472 (1999 census results).

The Central Hospital of District is located in Ushtobe.

== History ==
The town is considered significant to Koryo-saram, ethnic Koreans of the mainland Soviet Union, as it served as the first dropoff point and community after their 1937 forced deportation to Central Asia. There is now a Kazakhstan–Korea Friendship Park that marks the location of their first community. There is also a Karatal Korean History Center that has exhibits with authentic houses and historical materials from their life in the area.

== Climate ==
Ushtobe has a cold semi-arid climate (Köppen: BSk), characterized by cold winters and hot summers.

Climate data for Ushtobe (1991–2020)
| Month | Jan | Feb | Mar | Apr | May | Jun | Jul | Aug | Sep | Oct | Nov | Dec | Year |
|---|---|---|---|---|---|---|---|---|---|---|---|---|---|
| Mean daily maximum °C (°F) | −4.7 (23.5) | −1.5 (29.3) | 8.1 (46.6) | 19.7 (67.5) | 25.7 (78.3) | 30.8 (87.4) | 32.3 (90.1) | 31.1 (88.0) | 25.4 (77.7) | 17.4 (63.3) | 6.5 (43.7) | −2.0 (28.4) | 15.7 (60.3) |
| Daily mean °C (°F) | −10.7 (12.7) | −7.6 (18.3) | 1.6 (34.9) | 11.7 (53.1) | 17.7 (63.9) | 23.0 (73.4) | 24.4 (75.9) | 22.5 (72.5) | 16.3 (61.3) | 8.8 (47.8) | −0.1 (31.8) | −7.4 (18.7) | 8.3 (46.9) |
| Mean daily minimum °C (°F) | −15.7 (3.7) | −12.5 (9.5) | −3.7 (25.3) | 4.3 (39.7) | 9.7 (49.5) | 15.0 (59.0) | 16.6 (61.9) | 14.0 (57.2) | 7.8 (46.0) | 1.6 (34.9) | −4.9 (23.2) | −11.9 (10.6) | 1.7 (35.1) |
| Average precipitation mm (inches) | 22.4 (0.88) | 22.3 (0.88) | 23.8 (0.94) | 24.4 (0.96) | 29.9 (1.18) | 24.3 (0.96) | 27.9 (1.10) | 16.0 (0.63) | 12.2 (0.48) | 24.2 (0.95) | 32.3 (1.27) | 28.1 (1.11) | 287.8 (11.33) |
| Average precipitation days (≥ 1.0 mm) | 5.7 | 5.6 | 5.2 | 5.1 | 5.2 | 4.8 | 4.3 | 2.8 | 2.7 | 4.1 | 6.4 | 6.3 | 58.2 |
Source: NOAA
