= Kälpe =

Village in Kazakhstan

Kälpe Кәлпе
- Village
- Location of Kälpe in Kazakhstan
- Coordinates: 45.05°N 77.54°E
- Country: Kazakhstan
- Region: Jetisu
- District: Karatal
- Established: 1931

Population
  - Total: 1,486
- Time zone: UTC+5 (Kazakhstan Time)

Kälpe (Kazakh: Кәлпе, Kälpe) is a village in Karatal District, Jetisu Region, Kazakhstan.

== History ==
Standing on land originally belonging to the Jalair tribe, the village was built as the Turkestan–Siberia Railway was being constructed. Located near the birthplace of Jolbarys biy, Kälpe became the sight of a Jolbarys biy Mausoleum in 1996.

== Population ==
According to the 2009 Kazakh census, the village's population was 1,786 people. The 2021 census showed this number reduced to 1,486 people.
