= Makanshi District =

Coordinates: 46°47′00″N 82°01′00″E

- District
- Мақаншы ауданы
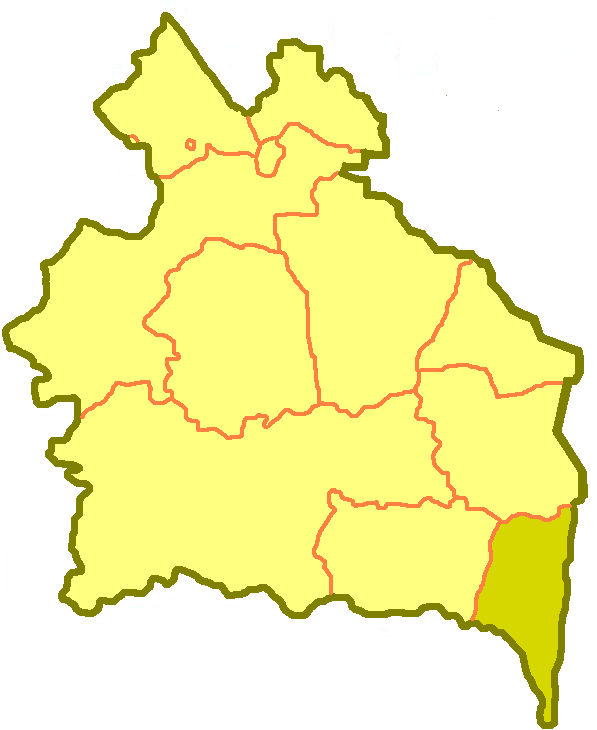
- Country: Kazakhstan
- Region: Abai Region
- Administrative center: Makanshi
- Established: 1928–1930; 1935–1963; 1969–1997; re-established 2024

Area
  - Total: 9,200 km^{2} (3,600 sq mi)
- Elevation: 2,992 m (9,816 ft)

Population (2021)
  - Total: 27,467
- Time zone: UTC+6 (East)

Makanshi District (Kazakh: Мақаншы ауданы, Russian: Маканчинский район) is a district of Abai Region in eastern Kazakhstan. The administrative center of the district is the village of Makanshi. Population: 44,831 (1989 Census results).

== History ==
The district was first established in 1928 at the time of the Kazakh ASSR. In the century that followed it went through three periods of abolishment and restoration. Finally Makanshi District was re-established in January 2024 by segregating the eastern sector of Urzhar District through a decree of the President of the Republic of Kazakhstan.
