= Karatal Korean History Center =

History museum in Ushtobe, Kazakhstan

Karatal District Korean History Center
- Location: Ushtobe, Kazakhstan
- Coordinates: 45.2702°N 77.9915°E
- Type: Local ethnic history museum

The Karatal District Korean History Center (Note: Tatar: Қаратал Ауданы Корей Халқының Тарихи Кешені, romanized: Qaratal Audanı Korey Xalqınıñ Tarixi Keşani; Russian: Исторический Комплекс Корейцев Каратальского Района, romanized: Istorichesky Kompleks Koreytsev Karatal'skogo Rayona; Korean: 까라딸지역 고려인 역사단지) is a local and ethnic history museum dedicated to the Korean community in Karatal District. It is located in Ushtobe, Kazakhstan.

Koreans of the mainland former Soviet Union are called Koryo-saram. They descend from populations of Koreans who were forced to move from the Russian Far East to Central Asia in 1937.

== History ==
The founder of the museum is Korean-American missionary Helen Park (Хелена; Пак Хи Джин; 박히진). In 2003, Park and her husband moved as missionaries to Russia. However, her husband passed away while they lived in St. Petersburg. Kim moved to Almaty, Kazakhstan to participate in the building of a missionary center. In Kazakhstan, she gathered donations to build a teaching facility for the Korean and English languages. Her students ended up successfully moving to South Korea for work. Upon hearing the story of how the Koryo-saram were once forced to move to Kazakhstan and given so few resources to start their new lives that they had to dig burrows out of the frozen ground with their bare hands (location of this is now at the Kazakhstan–Korea Friendship Park), she felt motivated to share their story. After suffering from a stroke in 2017, she began work on preparing the museum. She received help from a number of people she met and fellow members of the Christian community.

== Description ==
There are both indoor and outdoor exhibits in the museum. One room is for watching historical films, which also contains books, photographs, and other historical materials. Another room contains household items, Korean clothing, letters, and newspapers.

In the courtyard, there are a number of recreated and authentic exhibits that demonstrate the daily life of the Koreans in Karatal. An original house that a Korean lived in was moved onto the museum grounds. There is an oven, a rice pounder, and a recreated burrow. There is an original thatched roof hut.

The museum managers, notably Helen Park, have been known to give tours to visitors to the surrounding area, to demonstrate where the Koreans engaged in various activities, such as growing rice.
