= Zharma District =

Coordinates: 49°22′48″N 81°15′00″E

Zharma
- District
- Жарма ауданы
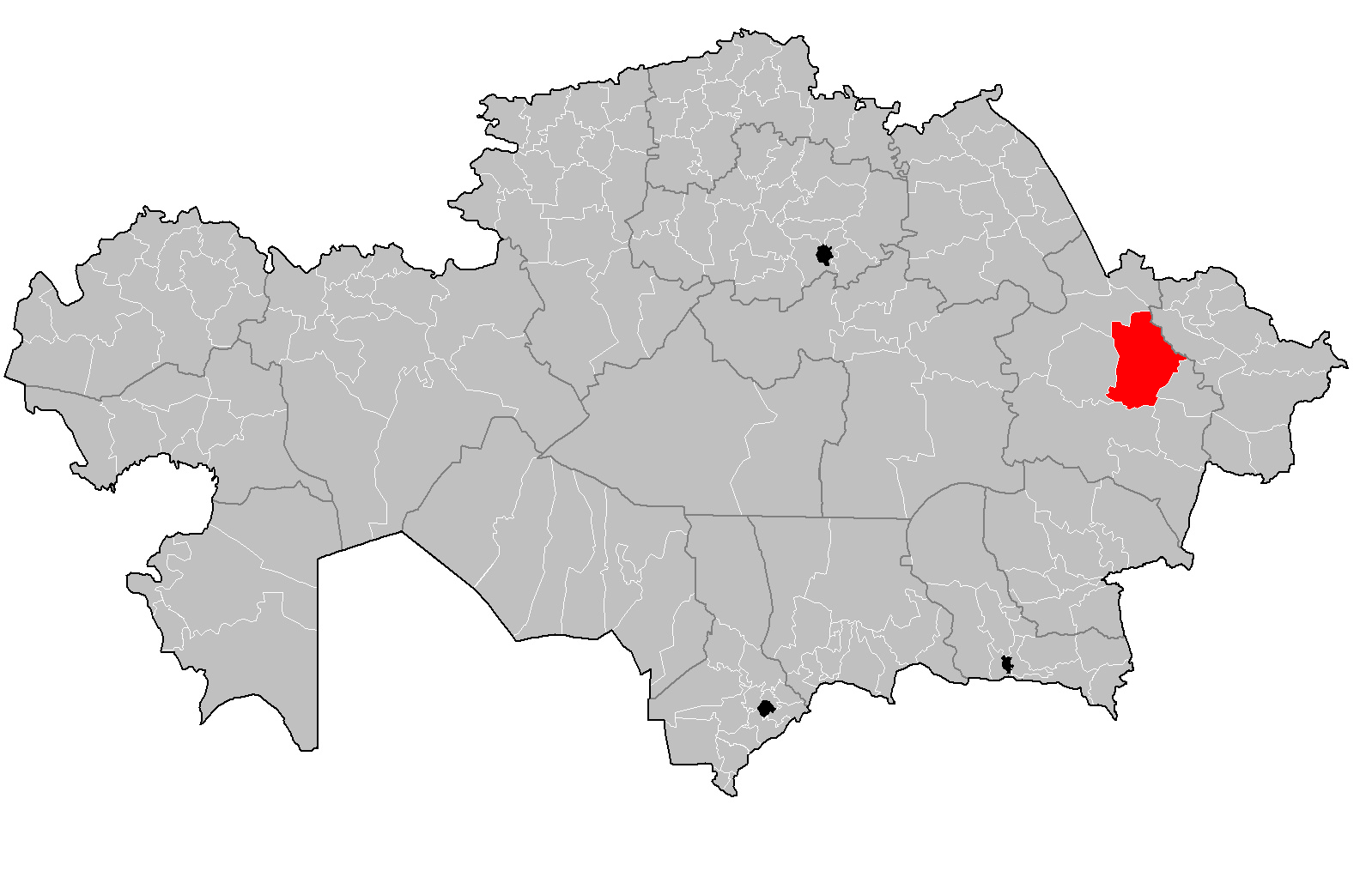
- Country: Kazakhstan
- Region: Abai Region
- Administrative center: Kalbatau
- Founded: 1928

Government
  - Akim: Nurymbet Saktaganov

Area
  - Total: 9,000 sq mi (23,400 km^{2})

Population (2013)
  - Total: 43,176
- Time zone: UTC+6 (East)

Zharma (Kazakh: Жарма ауданы, Jarma audany) is a district of Abai Region in eastern Kazakhstan. The administrative center of the district is the village of Kalbatau (Georgiyevka). Population: 43,176 (2013 estimate); 44,831 (2009 census results); 60,247 (1999 census results).
