= List of Äkims of Abai Region =

This is the list of äkıms of Abai Region that have held the position since the creation of the region in 2022.

== List of Äkıms ==
No.	Äkım (birth–death)		Term of office			Political party	Ref
No.	Portrait	Name	Took office	Left office	Time in office	Political party	Ref
1		Nurlan Uranhaev; Нұрлан Ұранхаев (born 1965)	11 June 2022	14 February 2025	2 years, 8 months	Independent	
2		Berik Uali; Берік Уәли (born 1977)	14 February 2025	Incumbent	1 year, 7 months	Independent	
