= Aksuat District =

Coordinates: 47°45′42″N 82°48′24″E

- District
- Ақсуат ауданы
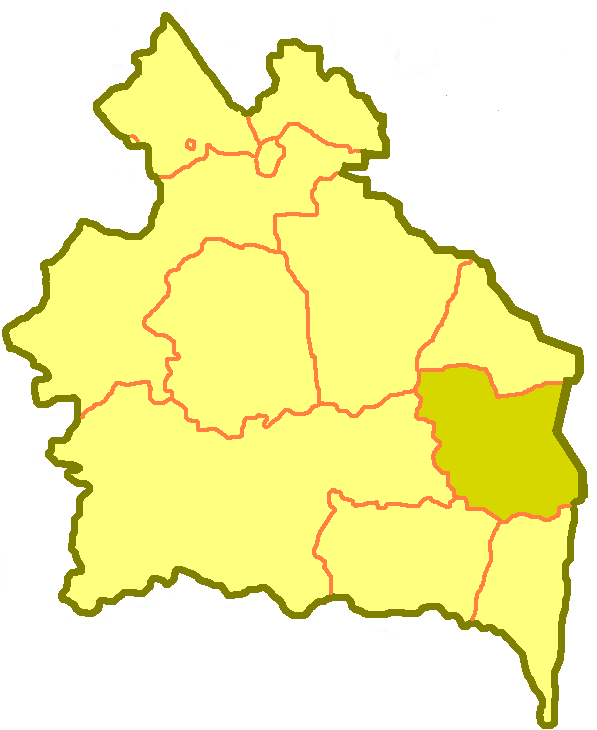
- Country: Kazakhstan
- Region: Abai Region
- Administrative center: Aksuat
- Established: 1935—1963, 1964—1997; re-established 2022

Area
  - Total: 13,600 km^{2} (5,300 sq mi)

Population (2023)
  - Total: 19,735
- Time zone: UTC+6 (East)

Aksuat District (Kazakh: Ақсуат ауданы / Aqsuat audany; Russian: Аксуатский район) is a district of Abai Region in eastern Kazakhstan. The administrative center of the district is the village of Aksuat. Population: 44,831 (1989 Census results).

== History ==
The district was first established in 1935 at the time of the Kazakh ASSR. In the century that followed it went through two periods of abolishment and restoration. Finally Aksuat District was re-established in May 2022 through a decree of the President of the Republic of Kazakhstan.
