= Karatal District =

Coordinates: 45.2447°N 77.979°E

Karatal
- District
- Қаратал ауданы
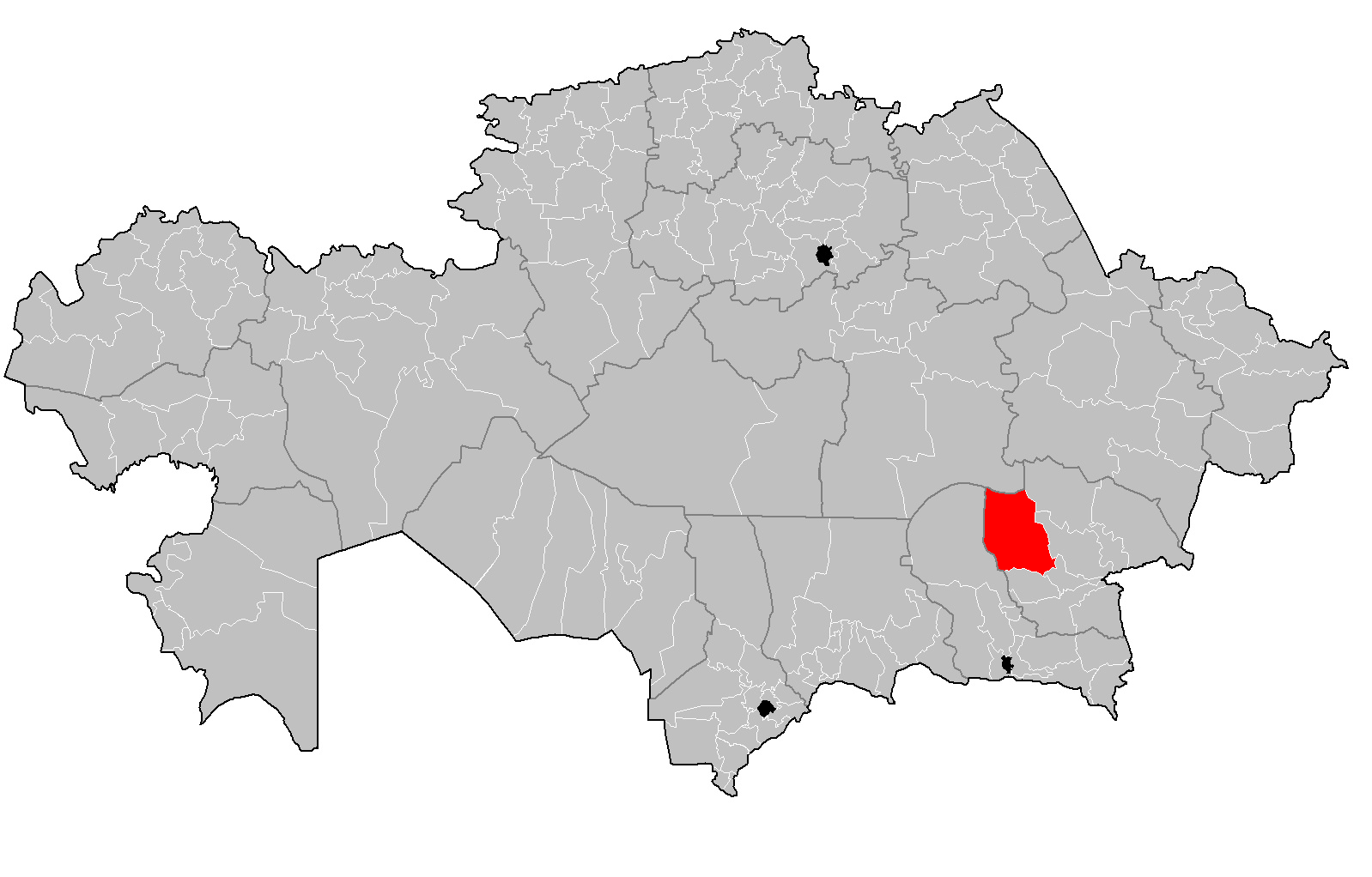
- Country: Kazakhstan
- Region: Jetisu Region
- Administrative center: Ushtobe
- Founded: 1928

Government
  - Akim: Ulan Dosymbekov

Area
  - Total: 9,300 sq mi (24,200 km^{2})

Population (2013)
  - Total: 47,760
- Time zone: UTC+6 (East)

Karatal District (Kazakh: Қаратал ауданы, Qaratal audany) is a district of Jetisu Region in Kazakhstan. The administrative center of the district is the town of Ushtobe. Population: 47,760 (2013 estimate); 47,824 (2009 census results); 46,744 (1999 census results).

There is a museum dedicated to the history of Koreans in the area in Ushtobe, called the Karatal Korean History Center.
