= Abai Region =

Abai Region Абай облысы (Kazakh) Абайская область (Russian)
- Region
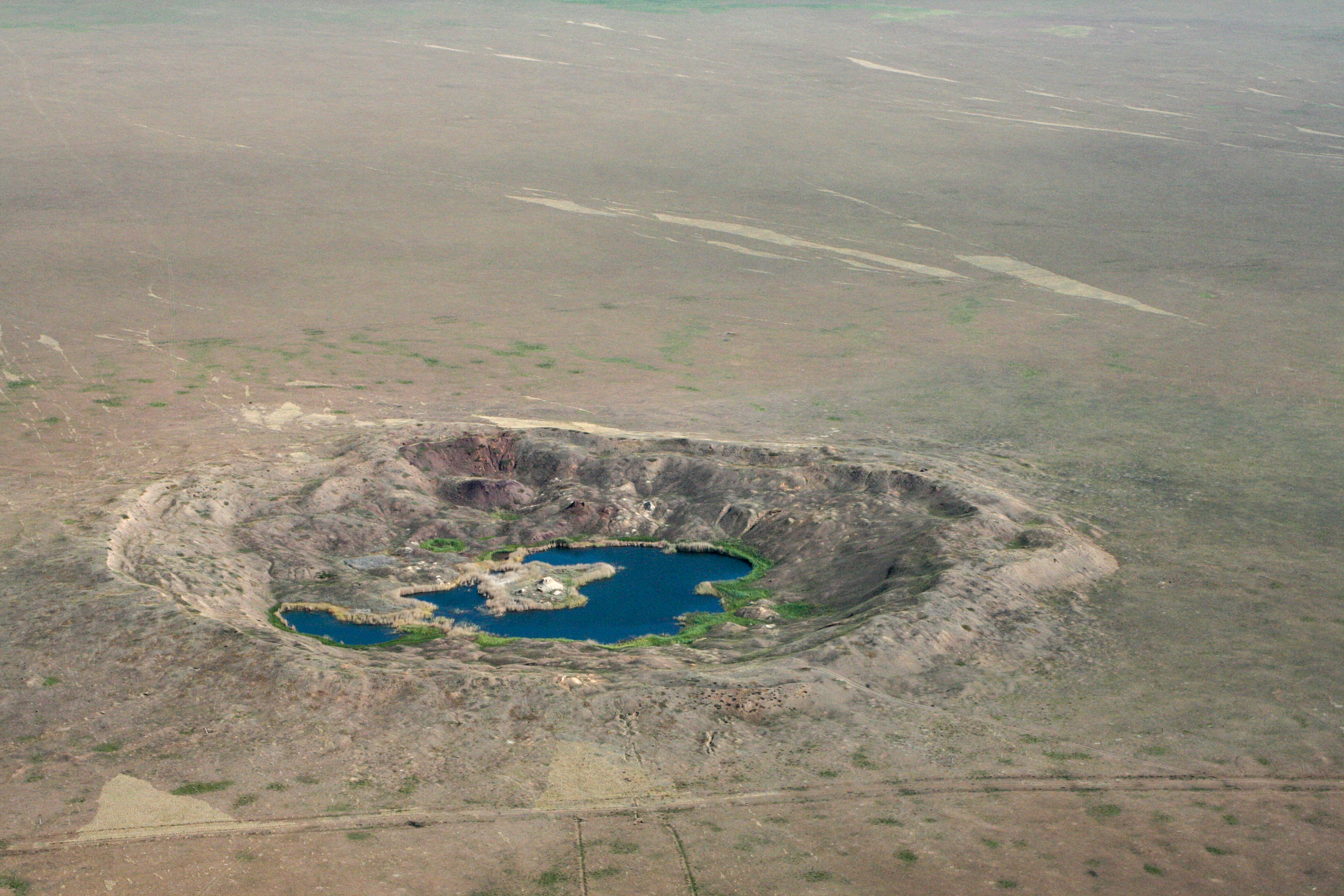
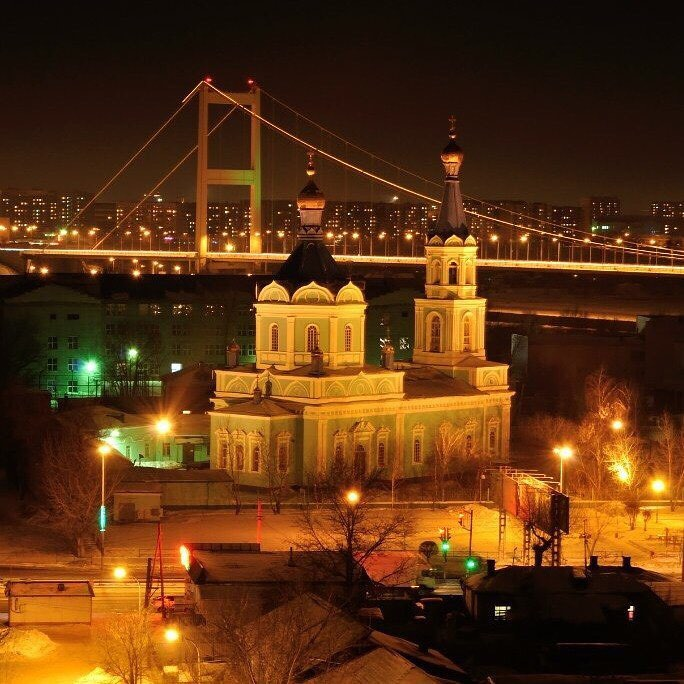
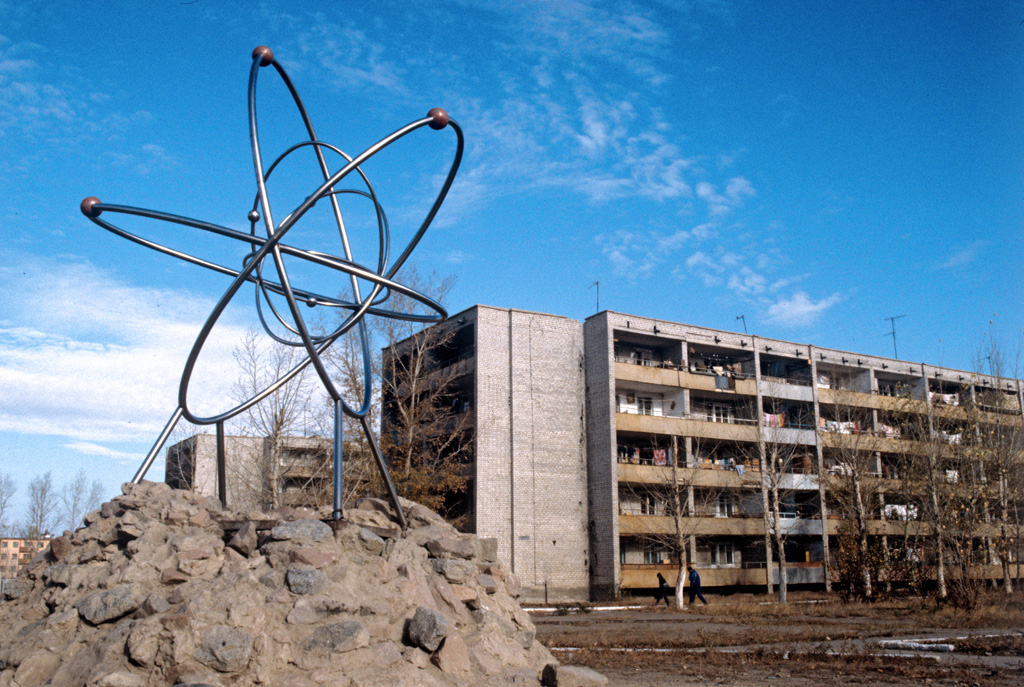
- From the top, Semipalatinsk Test Site, Semey, Kurchatov

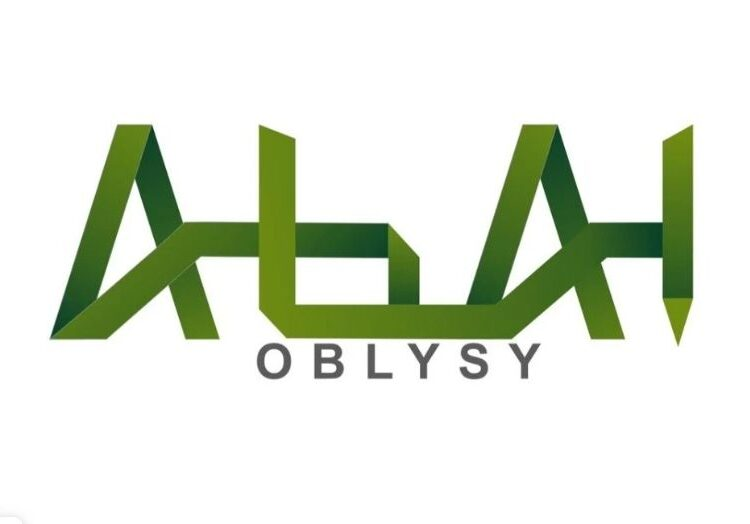
- Seal

- Map of Kazakhstan, location of Abai Region highlighted
- Country: Kazakhstan
- Administrative center: Semey
- Established: 8 June 2022

Government
  - Äkim: Berik Uali

Area
  - Total: 185,500 km^{2} (71,600 sq mi)

Population (2021)
  - Total: 638,300

GDP (Nominal, 2024)
  - Total: KZT 3,190 billion (US$ 6.698 billion) · 16th
  - Per capita: KZT 5,270,200 (US$ 11,067)
- Time zone: UTC+5

Abai Region (Note: Kazakh: Абай облысы, romanized: Abai oblysy, pronounced [ɑˈbɑj wobləˈsə]; Russian: Абайская область) is a region of Kazakhstan. President Kassym-Jomart Tokayev announced on 16 March 2022 that the region would be created. The area split off from East Kazakhstan Region when Tokayev's bill came into force on 8 June 2022. The administrative center of the region is Semey, until 2007 known as "Semipalatinsk". Its borders roughly correspond to the old Semipalatinsk Region which was abolished in 1997 and merged with East Kazakhstan Region.

== Geography ==
The city of Semey is the administrative center of the region of Abai. The Region of Abai borders East Kazakhstan Region and Xinjiang to the east, Pavlodar Region and Altai Krai to the north, Karaganda Region to the west and Jetisu Region to the south.

== Demographics ==
Population of the Abay region
2022	2023	2025	2026
611 888	610 158	600 800	595 720

=== Ethnic composition ===
==== Region total ====
Ethnic composition of the population (as of early 2026):
Ethnicity	Population	%
Total	595,720	100.00%
Kazakhs	471,846	79.21%
Russians	93,294	15.66%
Tatars	10,837	1.82%
Germans	8,277	1.39%
Ukrainians	3,037	0.51%
Uyghurs	1,069	0.18%
Belarusians	870	0.15%
Uzbeks	754	0.13%
Chechens	611	0.10%
Azerbaijanis	530	0.09%
Koreans	504	0.08%
Tajiks	357	0.06%
Others	2,735	0.46%

==== By districts and cities of regional significance ====
Ethnic composition by districts and city administrations (as of early 2026)
District / City	Total	Kazakhs	%	Russians	%	Tatars	%	Germans	%	Ukrainians	%	Belarusians	%	Chechens	%	Koreans	%	Azerb.	%	Uzbeks	%
Abai Region total	595,720	471,846	79.21%	93,294	15.66%	10,837	1.82%	8,277	1.39%	3,037	0.51%	870	0.15%	611	0.10%	504	0.08%	530	0.09%	754	0.13%
Semey C.A.	315,314	234,485	74.37%	62,337	19.77%	8,536	2.71%	3,373	1.07%	1,816	0.58%	486	0.15%	216	0.07%	310	0.10%	357	0.11%	486	0.15%
Kurchatov C.A.	9,849	5,907	59.98%	3,267	33.17%	131	1.33%	179	1.82%	125	1.27%	46	0.47%	5	0.05%	9	0.09%	14	0.14%	15	0.15%
Abai District	13,142	12,947	98.52%	52	0.40%	26	0.20%	10	0.08%	3	0.02%	1	0.01%	0	0.00%	0	0.00%	6	0.05%	2	0.02%
Aksuat District	18,097	18,002	99.48%	15	0.08%	11	0.06%	36	0.20%	0	0.00%	2	0.01%	0	0.00%	0	0.00%	0	0.00%	0	0.00%
Ayagoz District	61,871	59,723	96.53%	1,108	1.79%	319	0.52%	106	0.17%	59	0.10%	18	0.03%	20	0.03%	19	0.03%	40	0.06%	87	0.14%
Beskaragay District	16,685	11,891	71.27%	3,552	21.29%	334	2.00%	506	3.03%	183	1.10%	34	0.20%	4	0.02%	10	0.06%	13	0.08%	12	0.07%
Borodulikha District	31,482	13,383	42.51%	13,499	42.88%	619	1.97%	2,764	8.78%	400	1.27%	171	0.54%	146	0.46%	77	0.24%	53	0.17%	35	0.11%
Zhanasemey District	19,269	15,250	79.14%	3,112	16.15%	181	0.94%	327	1.70%	167	0.87%	45	0.23%	8	0.04%	25	0.13%	1	0.01%	6	0.03%
Zharma District	32,749	29,994	91.59%	1,703	5.20%	161	0.49%	309	0.94%	186	0.57%	28	0.09%	122	0.37%	2	0.01%	25	0.08%	36	0.11%
Kokpekty District	12,635	10,608	83.96%	1,217	9.63%	328	2.59%	313	2.48%	34	0.27%	18	0.14%	12	0.10%	3	0.02%	2	0.02%	16	0.13%
Makanshi District	24,771	24,008	96.92%	462	1.87%	47	0.19%	28	0.11%	16	0.06%	4	0.02%	3	0.01%	2	0.01%	1	0.00%	17	0.07%
Urzhar District	39,856	35,648	89.44%	2,970	7.45%	144	0.36%	326	0.82%	48	0.12%	17	0.04%	75	0.19%	47	0.12%	18	0.05%	42	0.11%

== Districts ==
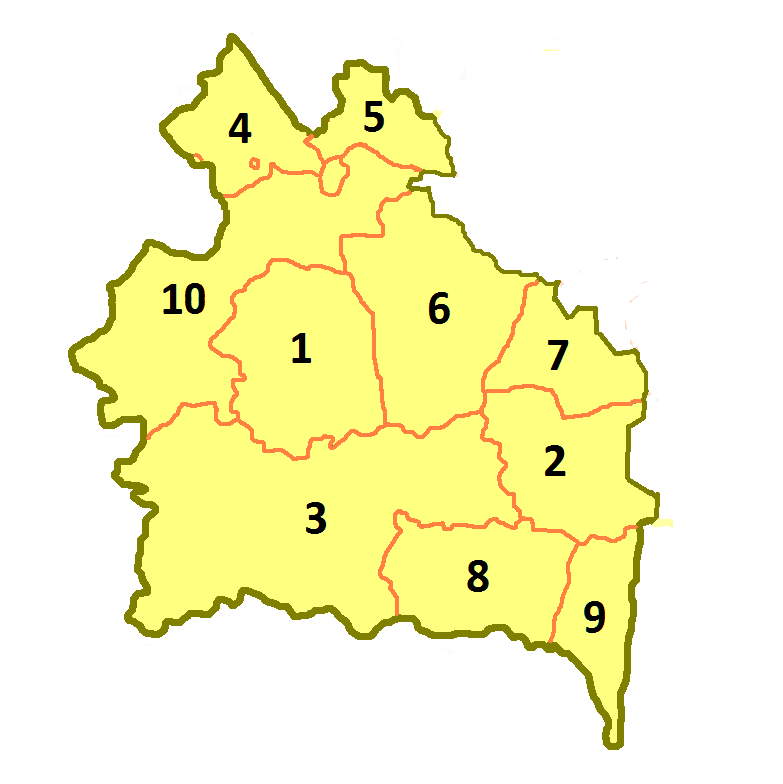
The districts of the region as of 2024

The region consists of the cities of Kurchatov and Semey, as well as the following 10 districts:

1. Abai District, with the administrative center in the selo of Karauyl;
2. Aksuat District, the village of Aksuat;
3. Ayagoz District, the town of Ayagoz;
4. Beskaragay District, the village of Beskaragay;
5. Borodulikha District, the village of Borodulikha;
6. Zharma District, the village of Kalbatau;
7. Kokpekti District, the village of Kokpekti;
8. Urzhar District, the village of Urzhar;
9. Makanshi District, the village of Makanshi;
10. Zhanasemey District, the city of Semey.

== Etymology ==
The region was named after the Kazakh aqyn Abai Qunanbaiuly, who was born in what is now the Abai Region.
