= Semey =

City in Abai Region, Kazakhstan

Semey Семей (Kazakh)
- City
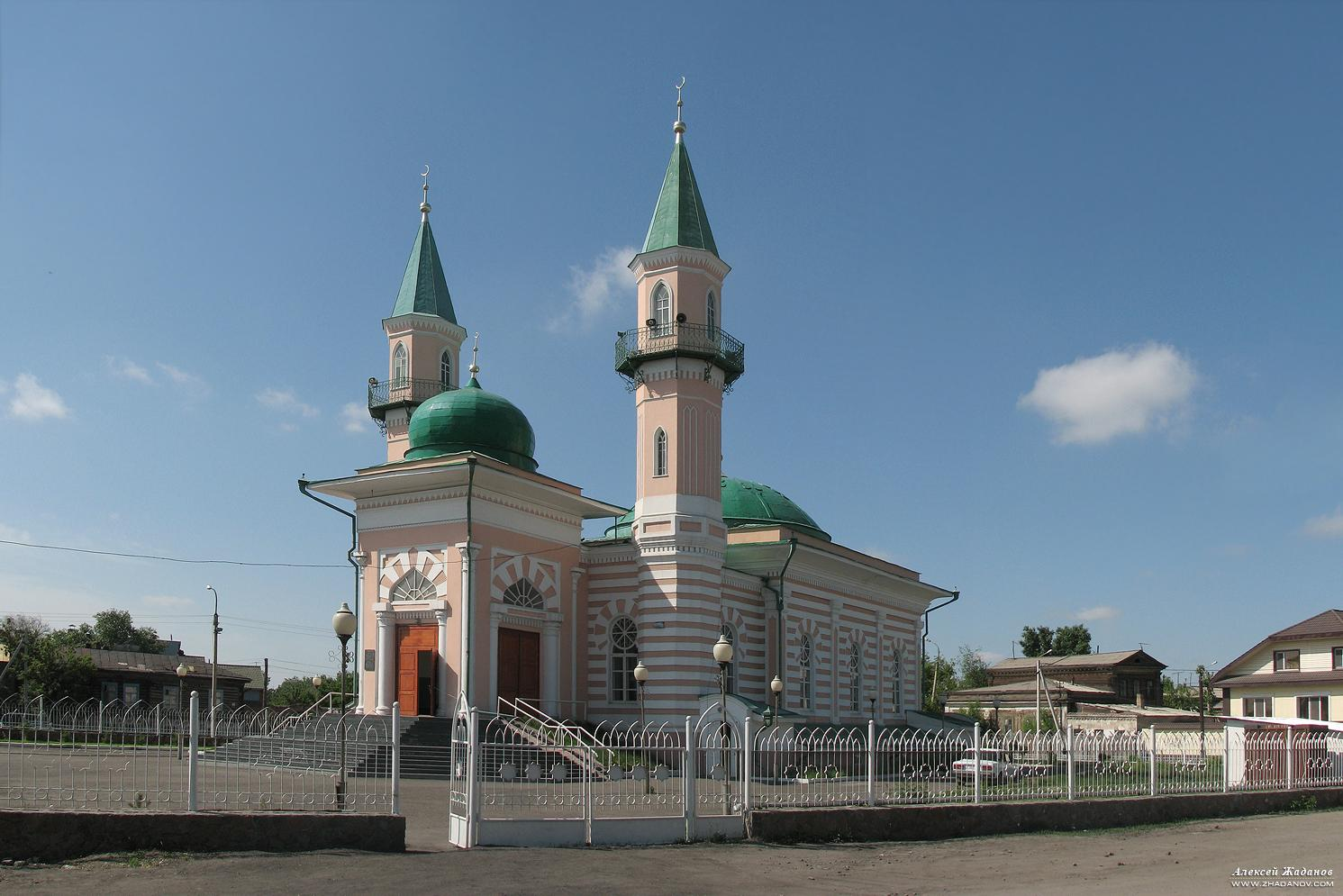
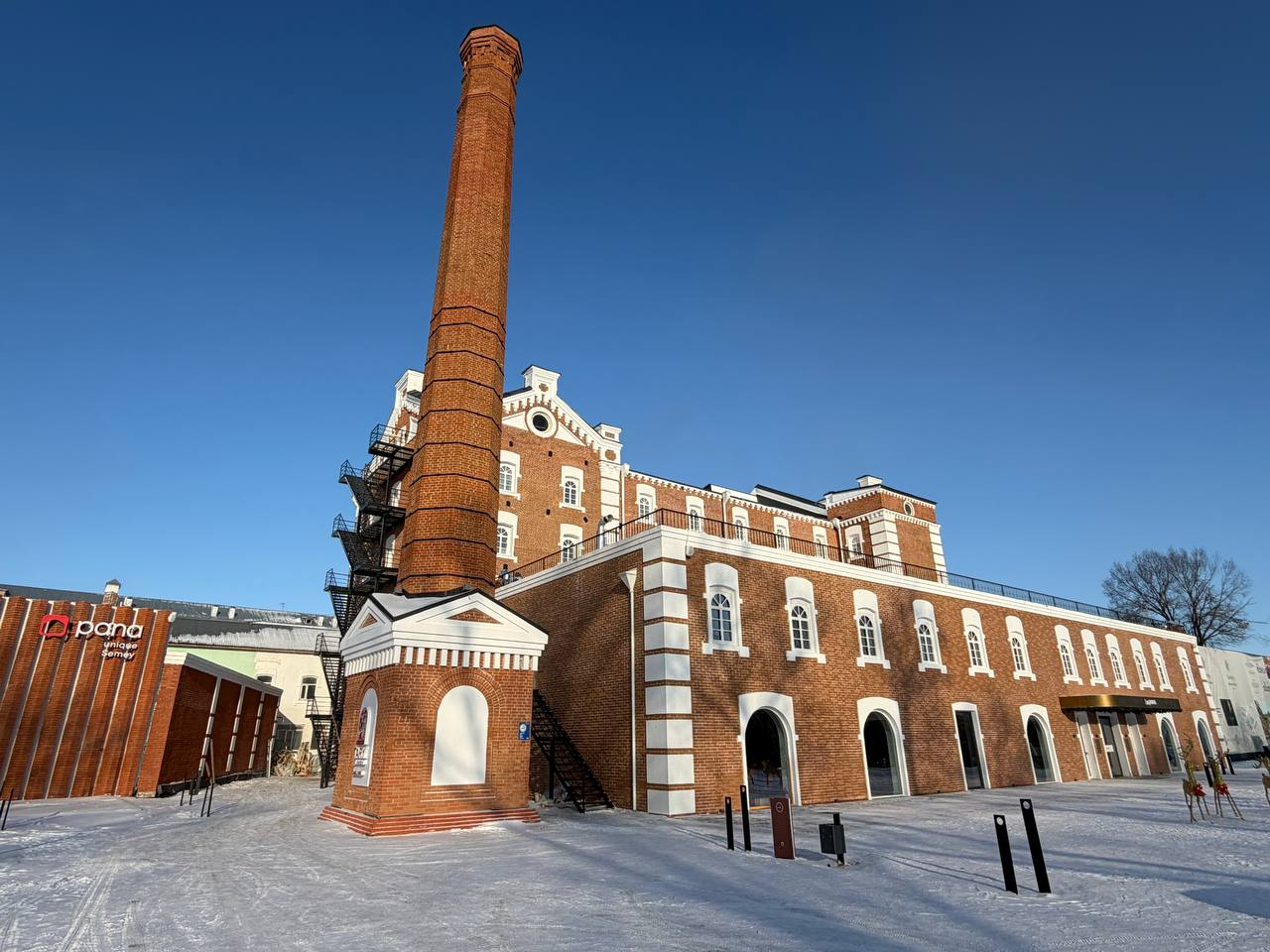
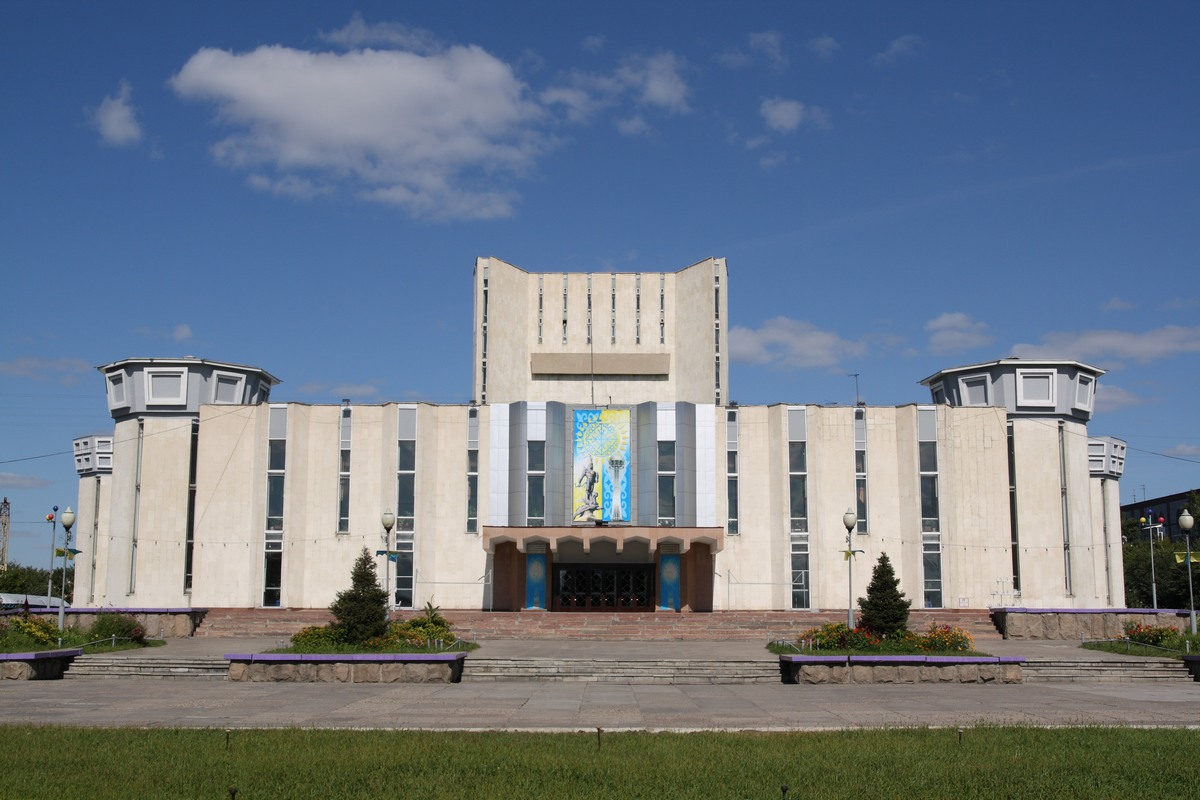
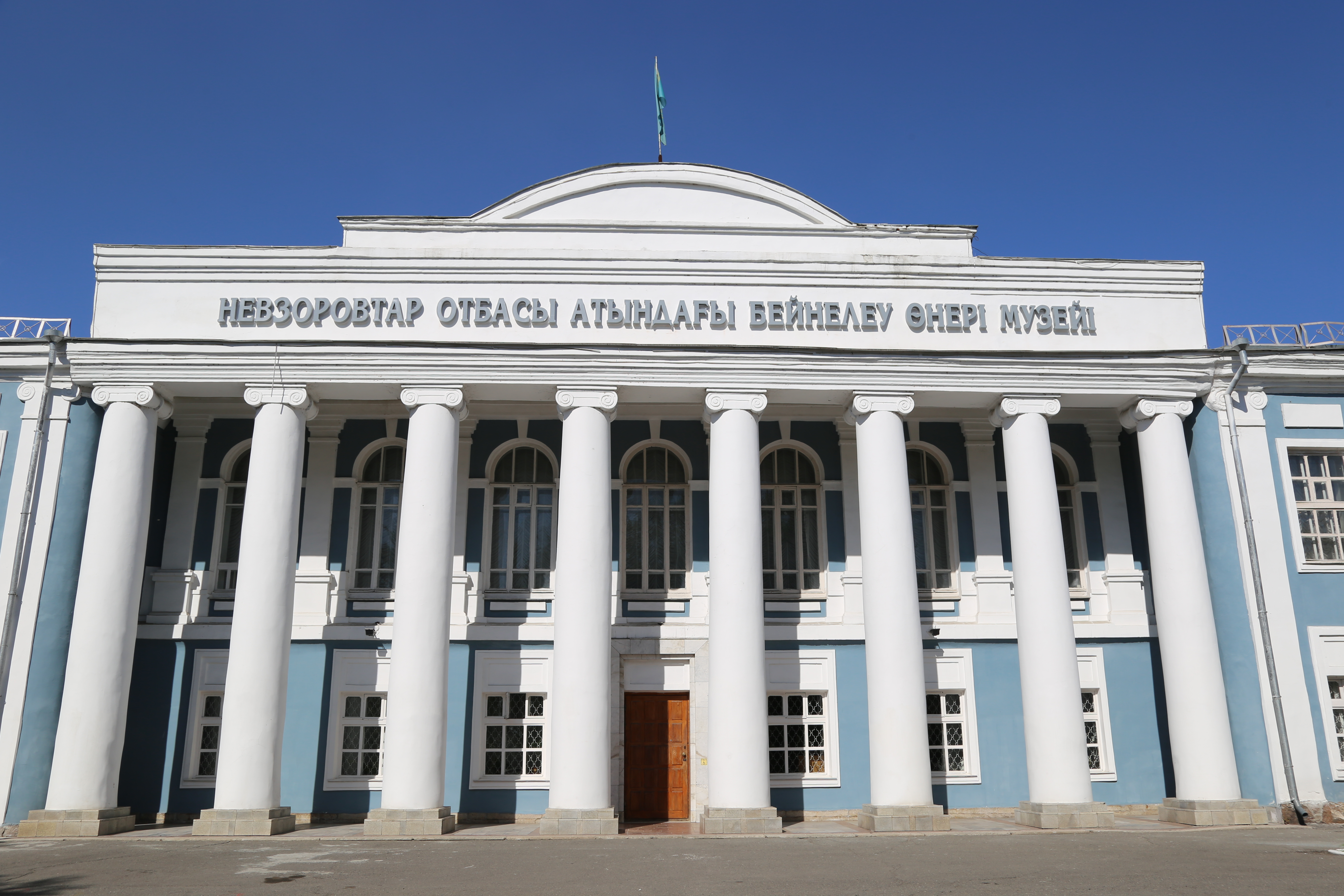
- Abai Museum Mosque Musin Mill Abai Theatre Museum of Fine Arts

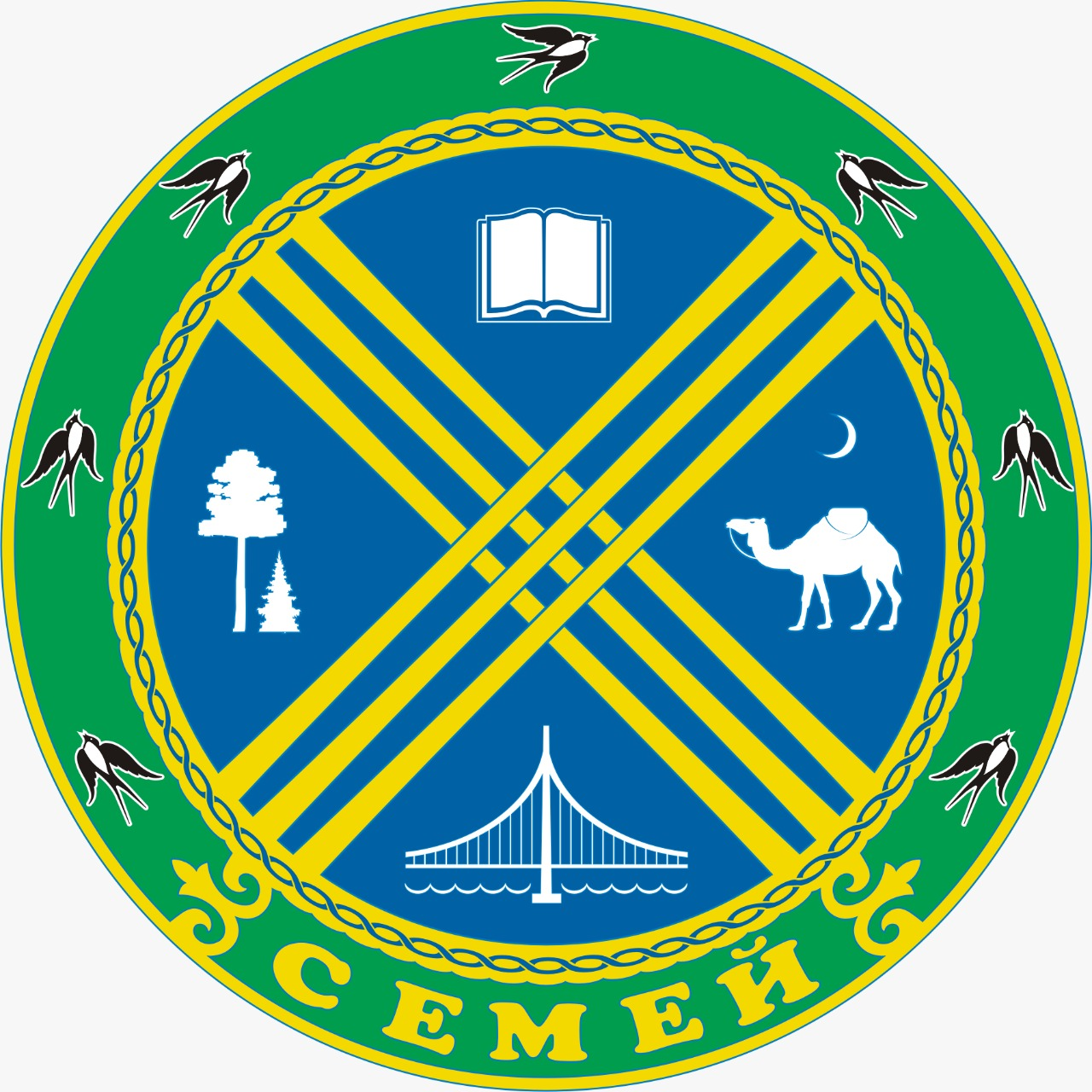
- Seal

- Location in Kazakhstan
- Coordinates: 50°26′0″N 80°16′0″E
- Country: Kazakhstan
- Region: Abai Region
- Founded: 1718
- Incorporated (city): 1782

Government
  - Acting Akim (mayor): Adlet Kozhenbayev

Area
  - Total: 210 km^{2} (81 sq mi)

Population (Nov 1, 2024)
  - Total: 312,764
- Time zone: UTC+5 (Time in Kazakhstan)
- Postal code: F1*****
- Area code: +7 7222
- Vehicle registration: U, 16

Semey (/sɪˈmeɪ, sɛ-/; Kazakh: Семей / Semei [sʲɪˈmʲej], formerly known as Semipalatinsk (Russian: Семипалатинск [sʲɪmʲɪpɐˈɫatʲɪnsk]) until 2007 and as Alash-Qala (Kazakh: Алаш-қала / Alaş-qala [ɑˌɫɑʃ‿qɑˈɫɑ]) from 1917 to 1920, is a city in north-eastern Kazakhstan, in the Kazakh part of Siberia. When Abai Region was created in 2022, Semey became its administrative centre. It lies along the Irtysh River near the border with Russia, 1,000 kilometers (620 mi) north of Almaty and 700 kilometers (430 mi) southeast of the Russian city of Omsk. Its population is 312,764 (stat.gov.kz).

== History ==
The first Russian settlement in the area dates from 1718, when Russia built a fort beside the river Irtysh, near the ruins of an ancient Buddhist monastery, where seven buildings could be seen. The fort (and later the city) was named Semipalatinsk (Russian for "Seven-Chambered City") after the monastery. The fort suffered frequent flooding caused by snowmelt swelling the Irtysh.

In 1778 the fort was relocated 18 kilometres (11 mi) upstream to less flood-prone ground. A small city developed around the fort, and largely served the river trade between the nomadic peoples of Central Asia and the growing Russian Empire. The construction of the Turkestan-Siberia Railway in the early 20th century added to the city's importance, making it a major point of transit between Central Asia and Siberia. On 19 May 1854, Semipalatinsk was designated as the capital of the Semipalatinsk Oblast within the Russian Empire.

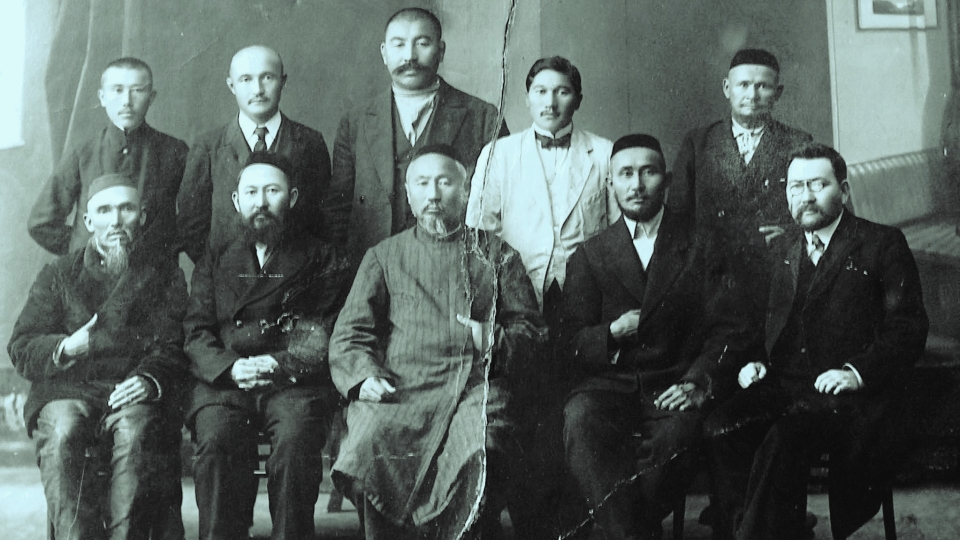
Kazakh intelligentsia and members of the Alash party in Alash-Qala, 1918

The city was one of the main centers for the publication of books by the Kazakh intelligentsia. Between 1917 and 1920, the city operated as the capital of the largely unrecognized Alash Autonomy, a state (1917–1920) established after the outbreak of the October Revolution in Russia. The city was called Alash-qala during the Alash Autonomy years. Red Army forces loyal to Petrograd took control of the area in 1920. It was the center of the Semipalatinsk Governorate until 17 January 1928, then of the East Kazakhstan Oblast between 17 January 1928 and 14 October 1939 and finally of the Semipalatinsk Oblast between 1939 and 1997.

During World War II, in connection with the formation of the Polish Anders' Army, a Polish diplomatic post was located in the city from October 1941 to July 1942.

In 1949 the Soviet atomic bomb programme selected a site on the steppe 180 km (110 mi) west of the city as the location for its weapons testing. For decades, Kurchatov (the secret city at the heart of the test range named for Igor Kurchatov, father of the Soviet atomic bomb) was home to many of the brightest stars of Soviet weapons science. The Soviet Union operated the Semipalatinsk Test Site (STS) from the first explosion in 1949 until 1989; 456 nuclear tests, including 340 underground and 116 atmospheric tests, took place there.

Some land around Semey has suffered environmental damage and ill-health effects from nuclear bomb testing: nuclear fallout from the atmospheric tests and uncontrolled exposure of the workers, some of whom lived in the area close to the test site, have resulted in high rates of cancer, childhood leukemia, and birth defects among the residents of neighbouring villages.

Modern Semey, a bustling university town, has a population exceeding 350,000. Because of its proximity to the Kazakh border with the Russian Federation, and the large scientific community attached to the STS labs and the university, which includes many Russians, Semey is said to have a more Russian character than other cities in Kazakhstan.

Semipalatinsk Oblast merged with the larger East Kazakhstan Region, whose capital city is Oskemen, on 23 May 1997.

The Semey Bridge, a suspension bridge across the Irtish River, connects the two major parts of Semey. It has a main span of 750 metres (2,460 ft) and a total length of 1,086 metres (3,563 ft). Construction began in 1998 and the bridge opened to traffic in November 2000.

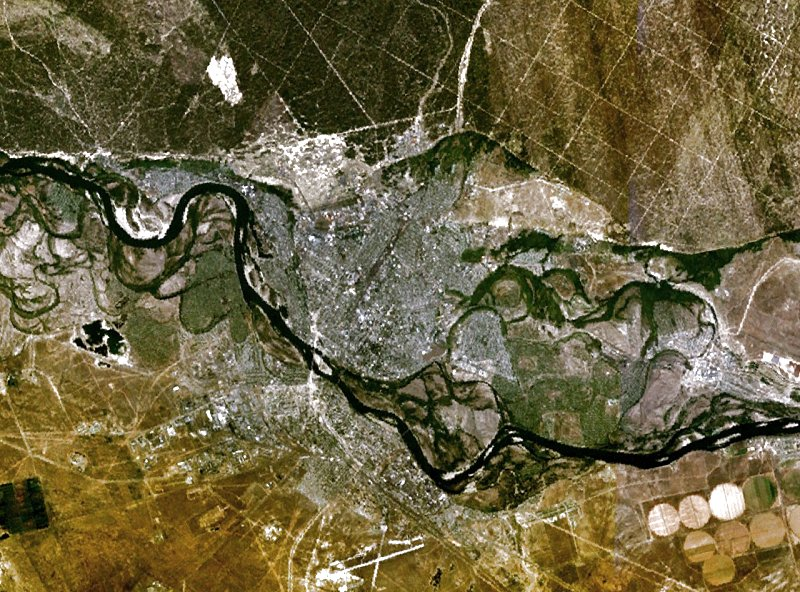
NASA satellite photo of Semey

In 2007 the Semipalatinsk City Council voted unanimously in favour of changing the name of the city to Semey. The Chairman said that existing name had negative associations because of the extensive atomic testing there.

In March 2022, Semey was selected by President Tokayev as the prospective capital of the new Abai Region. This came into force on 8 June 2022 when Abai Region became an official Region of Kazakhstan.

On October 12 2025, the city held its first mayoral election.

== Climate ==
Semey has a cold semi-arid climate, with warm summers and very cold winters. Precipitation is low for the whole year, except for July which has an average of 50 millimetres (2.0 in) compared to less than 30 millimetres (1.2 in) in other months. Snow is common, though light, in winter. The lowest temperature on record is −48.6 °C (−55.5 °F), recorded in November 1910, and the highest temperature is 42.5 °C (108.5 °F), recorded in August 2002.

Climate data for Semey (1991–2020, extremes 1854–present)
Month	Jan	Feb	Mar	Apr	May	Jun	Jul	Aug	Sep	Oct	Nov	Dec	Year
Record high °C (°F)	7.2 (45.0)	7.2 (45.0)	24.5 (76.1)	33.9 (93.0)	37.5 (99.5)	39.5 (103.1)	42.1 (107.8)	42.5 (108.5)	38.9 (102.0)	30.0 (86.0)	21.0 (69.8)	7.8 (46.0)	42.5 (108.5)
Mean daily maximum °C (°F)	−10.3 (13.5)	−7.6 (18.3)	0.4 (32.7)	14.3 (57.7)	22.1 (71.8)	27.4 (81.3)	28.5 (83.3)	27.0 (80.6)	20.5 (68.9)	12.1 (53.8)	0.3 (32.5)	−7.1 (19.2)	10.6 (51.1)
Daily mean °C (°F)	−15.1 (4.8)	−13.2 (8.2)	−5.0 (23.0)	7.5 (45.5)	14.8 (58.6)	20.5 (68.9)	21.7 (71.1)	19.6 (67.3)	12.7 (54.9)	5.4 (41.7)	−4.5 (23.9)	−11.5 (11.3)	4.4 (39.9)
Mean daily minimum °C (°F)	−20.2 (−4.4)	−19.1 (−2.4)	−10.4 (13.3)	0.6 (33.1)	6.8 (44.2)	12.8 (55.0)	14.7 (58.5)	11.9 (53.4)	5.0 (41.0)	−0.5 (31.1)	−8.9 (16.0)	−16.2 (2.8)	−2.0 (28.4)
Record low °C (°F)	−47.2 (−53.0)	−45.3 (−49.5)	−38.9 (−38.0)	−26.1 (−15.0)	−9.9 (14.2)	−1.1 (30.0)	3.9 (39.0)	−1.0 (30.2)	−8.2 (17.2)	−20.8 (−5.4)	−48.6 (−55.5)	−45.8 (−50.4)	−48.6 (−55.5)
Average precipitation mm (inches)	16.4 (0.65)	17.7 (0.70)	19.8 (0.78)	16.7 (0.66)	27.0 (1.06)	34.7 (1.37)	50.0 (1.97)	26.5 (1.04)	16.8 (0.66)	22.5 (0.89)	27.8 (1.09)	24.7 (0.97)	300.6 (11.84)
Average extreme snow depth cm (inches)	17 (6.7)	21 (8.3)	12 (4.7)	0 (0)	0 (0)	0 (0)	0 (0)	0 (0)	0 (0)	0 (0)	3 (1.2)	11 (4.3)	21 (8.3)
Average rainy days	1	1	3	9	13	12	15	12	10	11	6	1	94
Average snowy days	18	18	14	4	0.4	0	0	0.03	0.1	5	14	19	93
Average relative humidity (%)	75	75	76	59	53	53	60	59	60	67	74	75	66
Mean monthly sunshine hours	108	139	199	243	303	335	342	307	242	144	111	94	2,567
Mean daily sunshine hours	3.5	4.9	6.4	8.1	9.8	11.2	11.0	9.9	8.1	4.6	3.7	3.0	7.0
Source 1: Pogoda.ru.net
Source 2: NOAA (sun, 1961–1990), Deutscher Wetterdienst (daily sun 1961-1990)

== Transportation ==
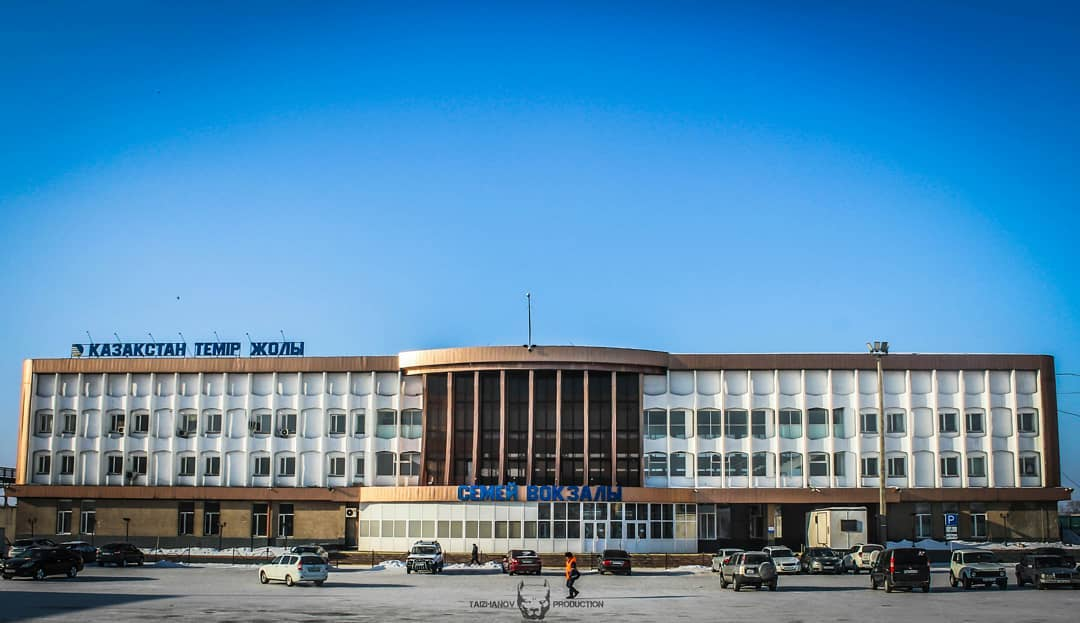
Main railway station

Semey is situated at the Turkestan–Siberia Railway and offers connections to Almaty (former Alma-Ata), Barnaul, and Novosibirsk, among others.

== Sights ==
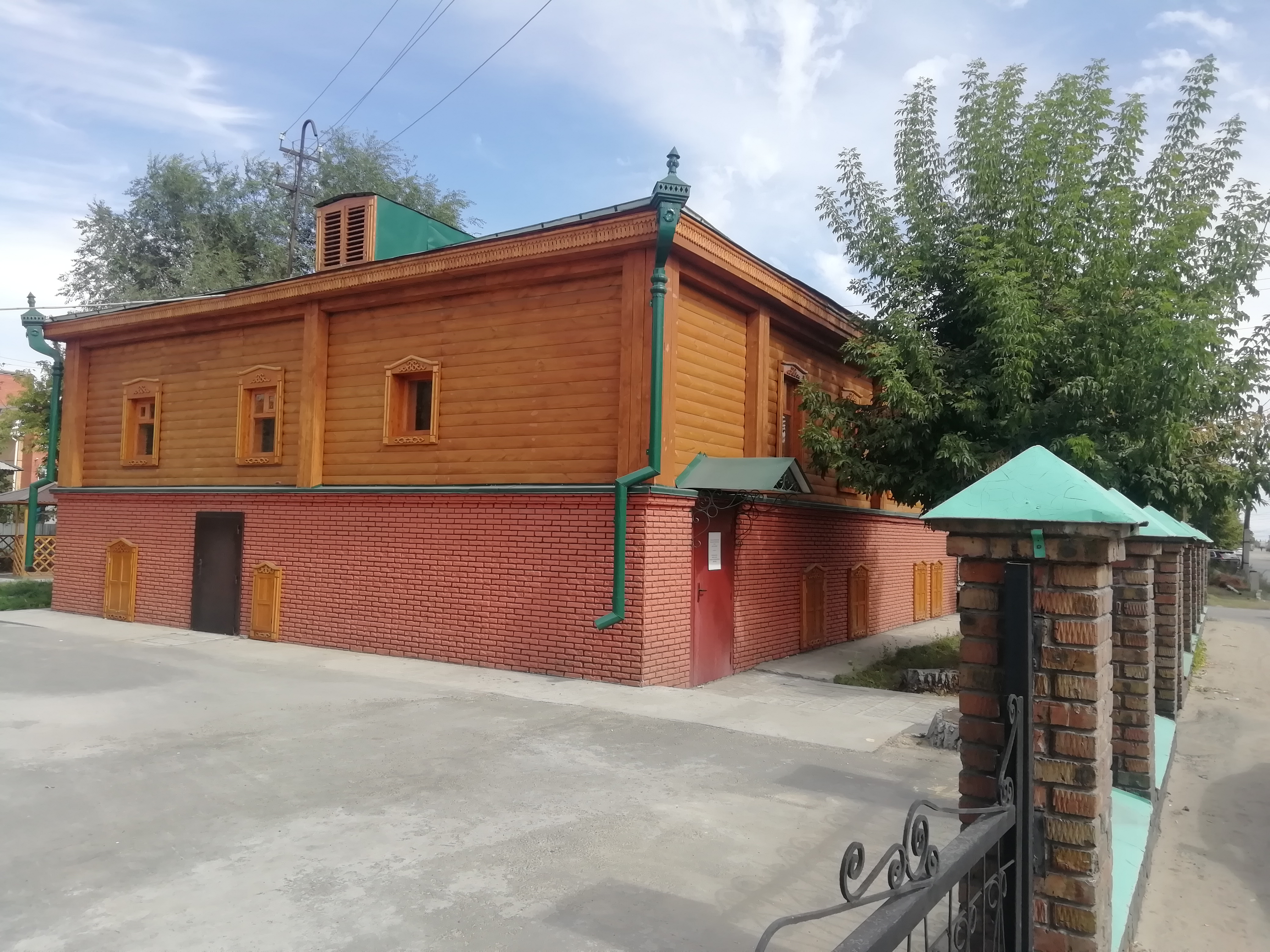
Alash Heroes – Mukhtar Auezov Museum

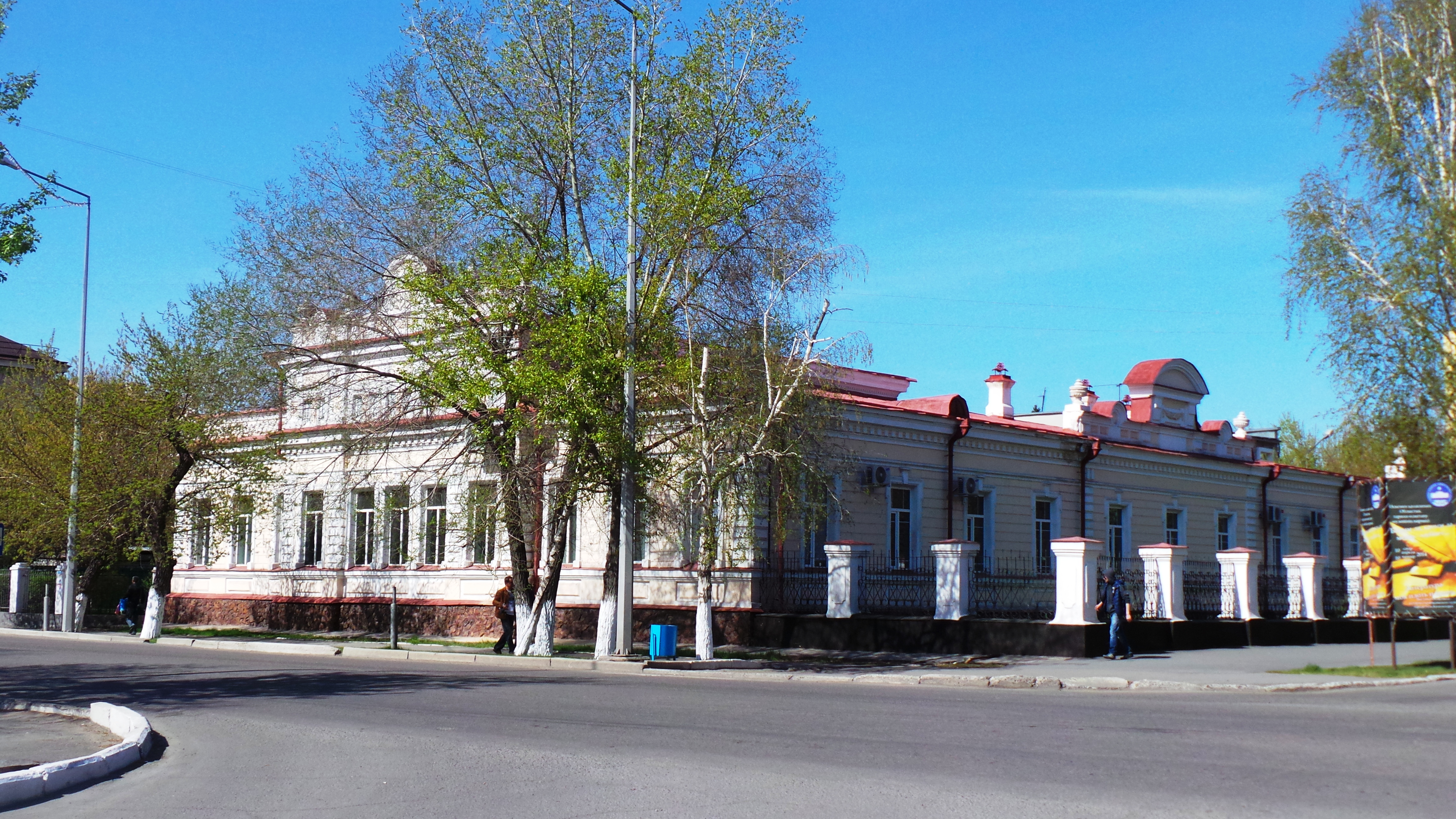
Regional Historical Museum

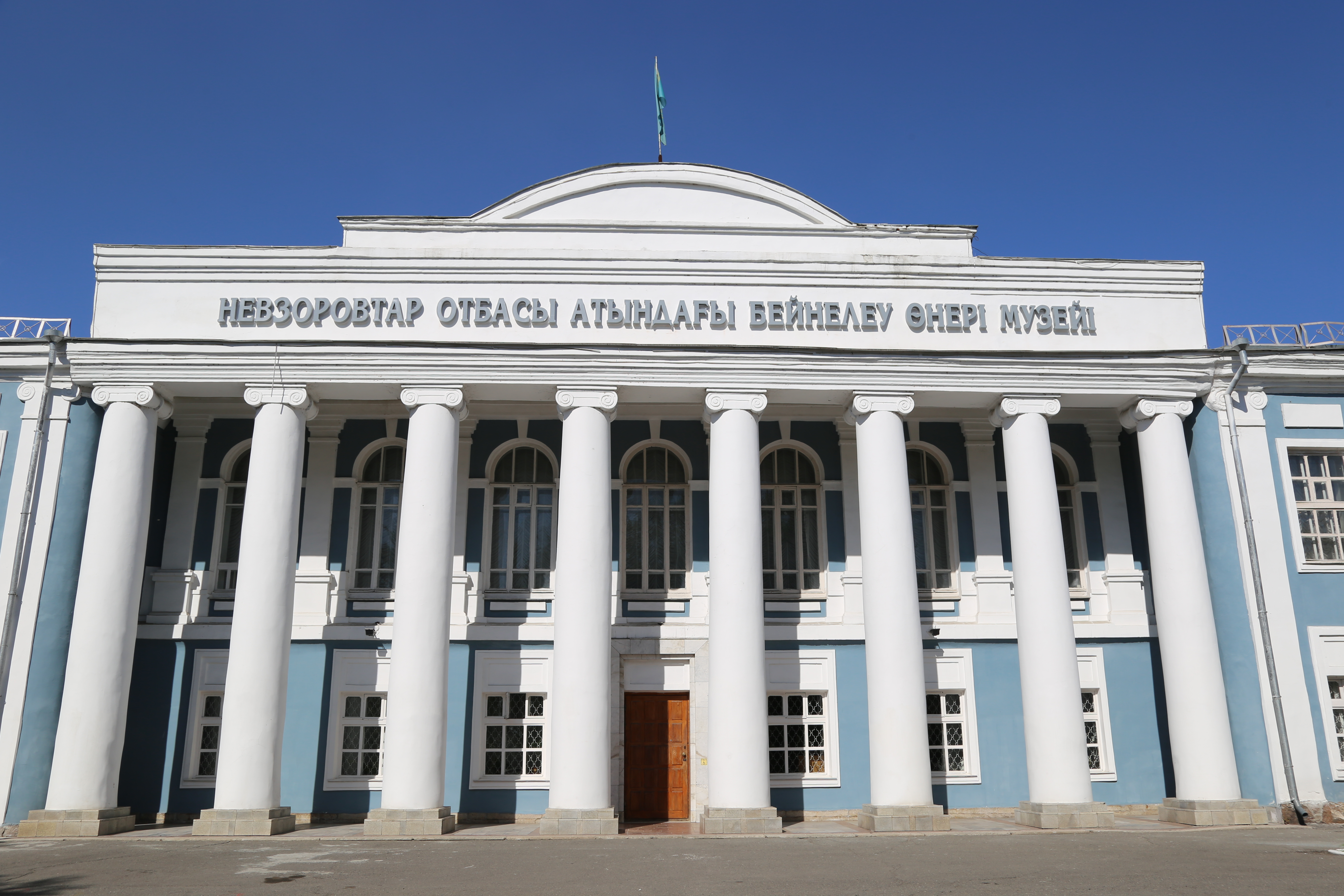
Museum of Fine Arts

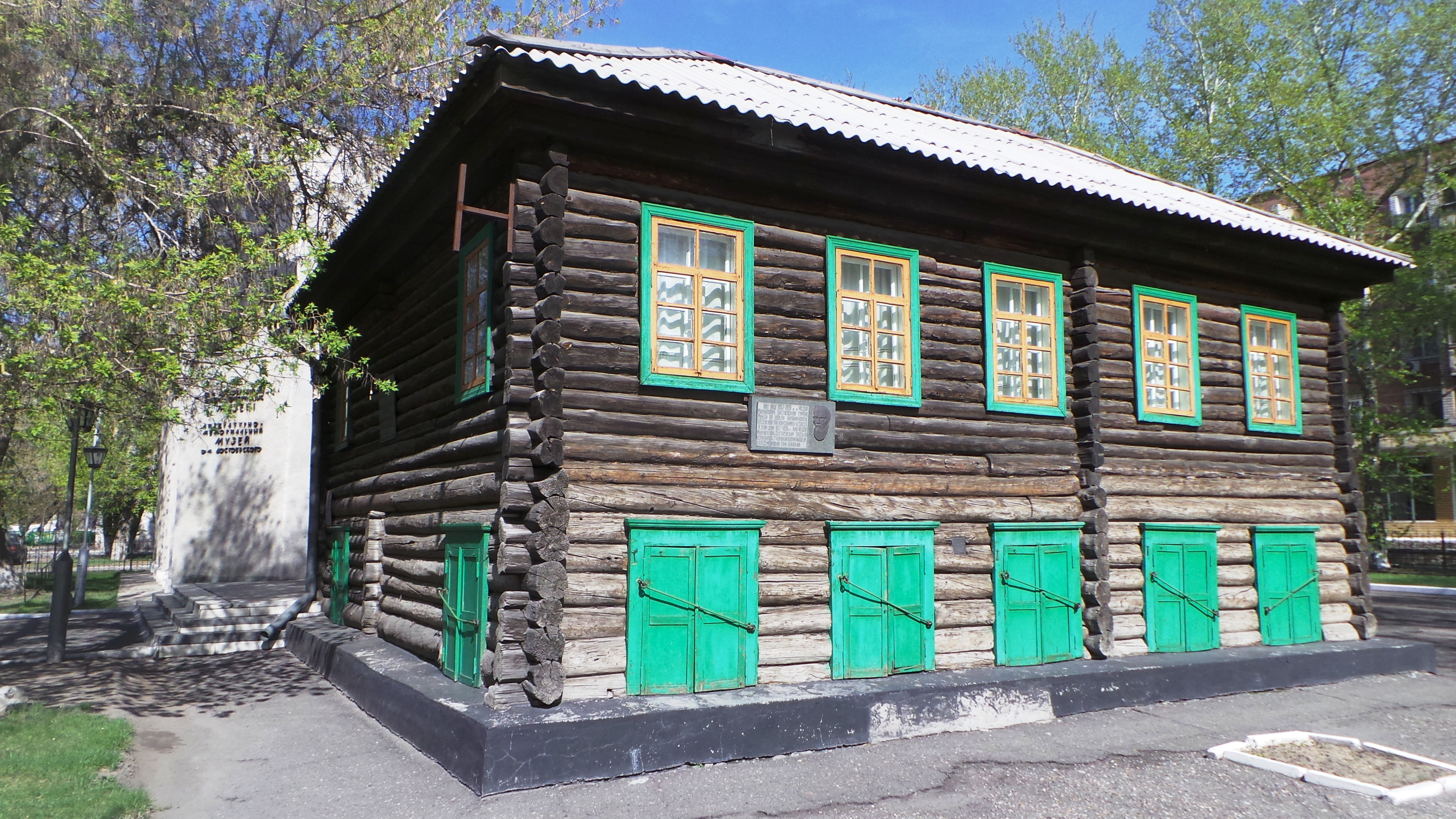
Dostoevsky Literary Memorial Museum

The city has a museum to commemorate Abay Qunanbayuli.

Both a museum and a street are named after Dostoyevsky. The Museum of F. M. Dostoevsky in Semey was opened on 7 May 1971. It was established by the Resolution of the Council of Ministers of the Kazakh SSR N 261. Of the seven museums devoted to Dostoevsky, this is the only one located outside Russia.

== Population ==
Historical population

Year	Pop.	±%
1881	17,820	—
1897	26,353	+47.9%
1910	34,400	+30.5%
1926	56,100	+63.1%
1939	109,700	+95.5%
1959	149,800	+36.6%

Year	Pop.	±%
1979	270,400	+80.5%
1989	317,100	+17.3%
1999	269,600	−15.0%
2009	299,264	+11.0%
2022	350,967	+17.3%
2024	312,764	−10.9%

== Higher education ==
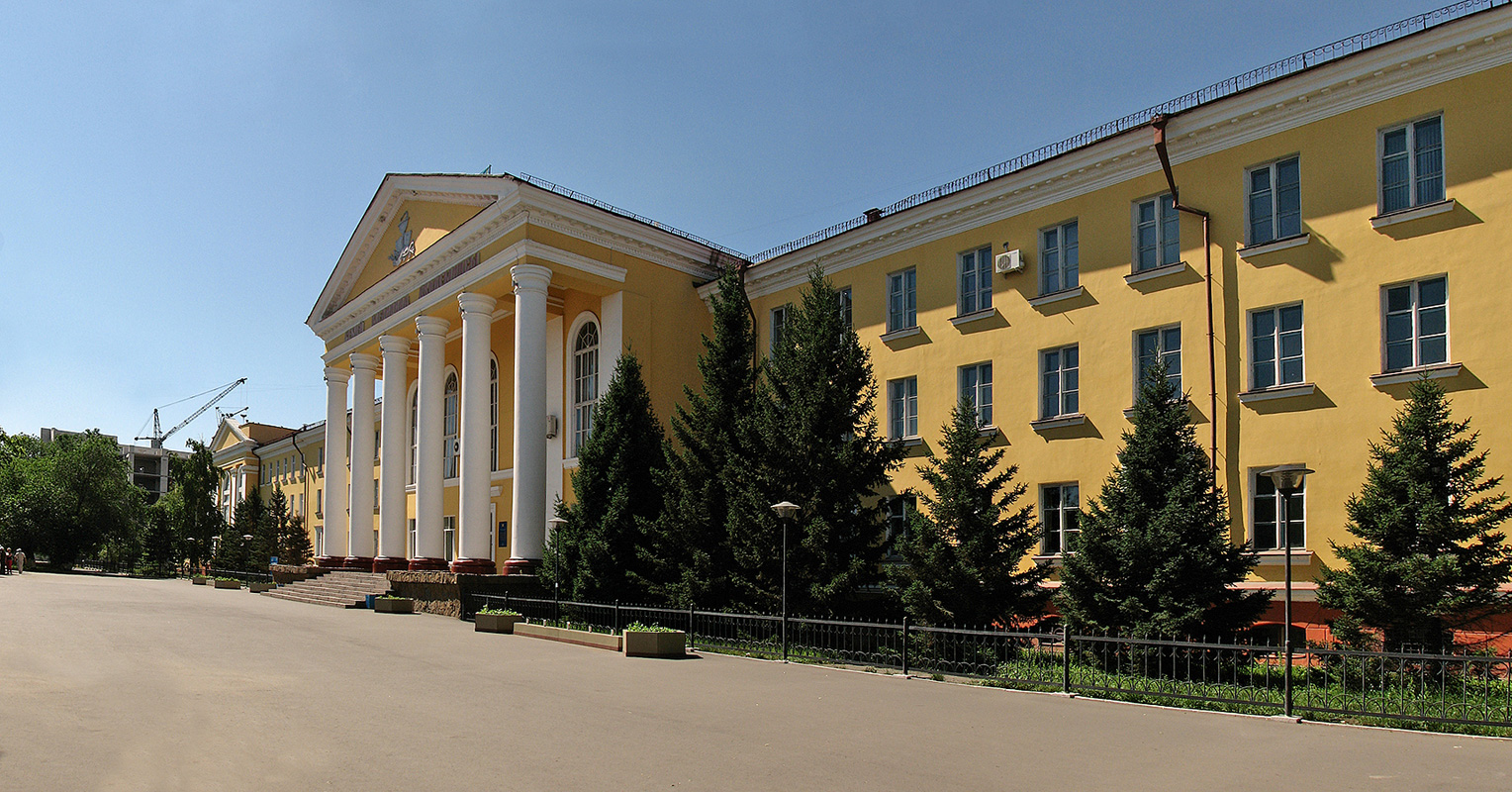
Semey Medicine Academy

Semey is home to Semey Medical University which provides the region and the country with professional health specialists.

== Notable residents ==
- Pavel Bazhov (1879–1950), writer and publicist
- Fyodor Dostoevsky (1821–1881), novelist
- Wladimir Klitschko (born 1976), Ukrainian boxer
- Stanislav Kurilov (1936–1998), oceanographer, defector
- Sergey Letov (born 1956), Russian musician
- Vladimir Lisitsin (1938–1971), footballer
- Abai Qunanbaiuly (1845–1904), poet, composer, and philosopher
- Zaq (born 1996), singer and a member of Kazakh boyband Ninety One
- Danil "molodoy" Golubenko (born 2005), professional Counter-strike 2 player for Furia Esports

== International relations ==
=== Twin towns and sister cities ===
Semey is twinned with:

- Ypres, Belgium

== See also ==
- Anti-nuclear movement in Kazakhstan
