= Turar Ryskulov (village) =

Village in Turkistan Region, Kazakhstan

Turar Ryskulov Тұрар Рысқұлов ауылы Vannovka (until 1993)
- Village
- Road arch near the village, 2015
- Interactive map of Turar Ryskulov
- Location within Kazakhstan
- Coordinates: 42.534456°N 70.351748°E
- Country: Kazakhstan
- Region: Turkistan Region
- District: Tulkibas District
- Founded: 1891

Population (1 January 2026)
  - Total: 25,692
- Time zone: UTC+5 (KAZT)
- Postal code: 161300
- Area code: +7 72538

Turar Ryskulov (Kazakh: Тұрар Рысқұлов ауылы; Russian: село имени Турара Рыскулова, romanized: selo imeni Turara Ryskulova), known until 1993 as Vannovka (Russian: Ванновка), is a village in Turkistan Region, southern Kazakhstan, and the administrative centre of Tulkibas District. It belongs to the Mailykent rural district. The village lies about 75 kilometres (47 mi) north-east of Shymkent and 9 kilometres (5.6 mi) from Tulkibas railway station.

The settlement was founded in the autumn of 1891 by peasant settlers as Vannovskoye, in the Chimkent uyezd of Syr-Darya Oblast of Russian Turkestan. It has been the centre of Tulkibas District since 1935, except for 1963–1966, when the district was abolished. On 7 October 1993, the centenary year of the Soviet statesman Turar Ryskulov, Vannovka was renamed in his honour. The population was 25,692 as of 1 January 2026.

== Name ==
Sources of the 1890s–1900s call the settlement Vannovskoye (Russian: Ванновское); the form Vannovka became established in the Soviet period. The name is associated with the Russian general Pyotr Vannovsky. A Kazakh name of the locality, Kokirek (Kazakh: Көкірек), is also recorded.

The village was renamed in 1993 after Turar Ryskulov (1894–1938), chairman of the Central Executive Committee and of the Council of People's Commissars of the Turkestan Autonomous Soviet Socialist Republic, who was executed during the Great Purge. The renaming was timed to the 100th anniversary of his birth.

== History ==
=== Foundation ===
According to Ivan Geyer, who toured the Russian villages of Syr-Darya Oblast in the spring of 1893, Vannovskoye was founded in the autumn of 1891 on the road from Chimkent (now Shymkent) to Aulie-Ata (now Taraz), between the Russian villages of Kornilovka and Vysokoye. Geyer regarded it as the best village of the Chimkent uyezd, old or new. The community numbered 103 householders; by the end of the first autumn, almost all plots along a street about four versts long had been built up with houses with high gable roofs. The settlers kept mostly Russian breeds of cattle and sheep, sowed kubanka wheat with seed bought in neighbouring Vysokoye, and also grew lentils and peas. Three mills were already working, and millstone was quarried two versts from the village and sold to other settlements. Crafts were only beginning: a blacksmith, a sheepskin dresser and some twenty weaving looms. Relations with the neighbouring Kazakhs were good, and every spring the village assembly agreed with the neighbouring aul communities on the repair of water intakes and the cleaning of irrigation ditches.

In the year of its foundation the villagers bought an icon with collected money and set aside the best house for prayers. A school with a spacious classroom and two rooms for the teacher was built with 600 roubles allocated by the administration and with the peasants' own labour; on holidays it served as a prayer house. The first bell was cast at the expense of a private donor, and two more were ordered from the Tashkent arsenal. In the spring of 1893 the community began preparing to build a church: each married couple was to contribute 200 bricks for the priest's house, and a communal field was sown for the church fund.

=== Church of St John the Theologian ===
Permission to build the church was granted in August 1900. The work dragged on for six years: for lack of funds the lower part of the walls was laid in stone and the upper part in fired brick, and the church was completed in 1906 by the contractor Guriy Davydov. On 5 November 1906 the dean of the Aulie-Ata district, priest Mikhail Zaozersky, consecrated the church in honour of the apostle and evangelist John the Theologian. The church, built in the Old Russian style, held about 800 worshippers; its bell tower had five bells, the largest weighing 80 poods, and its three-tiered gilded iconostasis was ordered from Moscow.

=== Soviet period ===
In 1928, when the okrugs were abolished and districts were introduced, Vannovka became the centre of the Zhually district. According to the administration of Jualy District, the Zhually district was at that time merged with Tulkibas and had its centre in Vannovka; it became a separate district within its present borders only in 1936. Tulkibas District, formed on 17 January 1928, was included in South Kazakhstan Region on 9 January 1935 with its centre in Vannovka. In January 1963 Tulkibas District was abolished and Vannovka was placed in Sayram District; the district was re-established with its centre in Vannovka in January 1966.

An Orthodox parish has operated in the village since 1947 in an adapted private house. In 1977 the weather station that had operated since 1915 at Tulkibas station was moved to Vannovka, and in 1983 the district museum of local history was opened.

=== Independent Kazakhstan ===
On 7 October 1993 Vannovka was renamed Turar Ryskulov. In 2018 South Kazakhstan Region, which includes Tulkibas District, was renamed Turkistan Region. In 2026 a new station building was opened at Tulkibas railway station.

== Geography ==
The village is located in the east of Turkistan Region, in the foothills, about 75 kilometres (47 mi) north-east of Shymkent and 9 kilometres (5.6 mi) from Tulkibas railway station, on the old road from Shymkent to Taraz. In Geyer's description of 1893, the road from Belye Vody climbed into the hills and each successive village lay higher than the last; Vysokoye, the next village towards Aulie-Ata, was the last settlement of the Chimkent uyezd on the border with the Aulie-Ata uyezd.

=== Climate ===
According to the national weather service Kazhydromet, the climate of Turkistan Region is sharply continental and arid: summers are hot, long and very dry, winters short and mild with frequent thaws. The foothills receive 400 to 600 millimetres (16 to 24 in) of precipitation a year or more, with the main maximum in spring and a secondary one in autumn. Geyer noted in 1893 that Vannovskoye occupied a transitional position in climate between the hot plain and the more temperate foothills.

The weather station Turar Ryskulov is one of three century-old stations of the former South Kazakhstan Region. It was opened in 1915 at Tulkibas railway station; after interruptions in 1916 and 1921, observations have been continuous since 1925, and in 1977 the station was moved to Vannovka.

== Demographics ==
In 1893 the village community consisted of 103 households. The population was 15,182 at the 1999 census (7,152 men and 8,052 women) and 17,311 at the 2009 census (8,403 men and 8,908 women). At the beginning of 2019 the official estimate was 17,977 (9,094 men and 8,883 women).

The 2021 census recorded 24,748 inhabitants (12,238 men and 12,510 women). The population was 25,732 on 1 October 2023, 25,722 on 1 January 2024, 25,671 on 1 January 2025, 25,692 on 1 January 2026 (12,837 men and 12,855 women) and 25,647 on 1 July 2026.

== Infrastructure ==
The village houses the administration of Tulkibas District (201 Turar Ryskulov Street); its postal code is 161300 and its telephone code is +7 72538. The Tulkibas Central District Hospital is located at 112 S. Bekbosynov Street.

The Tulkibas District Museum of Local History named after Turar Ryskulov was founded in 1983. It occupies a two-storey building of 596 square metres (6,420 sq ft) on Ryskulov Street; its four halls are devoted to the life and work of Turar Ryskulov and to the history of the district, including the victims of the political repressions of 1937–1938, participants of the Great Patriotic War and veterans of labour.

The Orthodox church of St John the Theologian (56 Sadykov Street) is housed in an adapted private house that has served as a church since 1947, when it was consecrated by Metropolitan Nikolai (Mogilevsky). In 1985–1988 an altar section and a narthex were added, the roof was raised and domes were installed; a two-tier belfry with five bells stands next to it.

== Transport ==
The nearest railway station, Tulkibas, lies in the settlement of the same name about 9 kilometres (5.6 mi) from the village. Its original station building dates from 1916; in 2026 a new building was opened, with a 90-seat waiting room and a capacity of 186 passengers a day, and the 540-metre (1,770 ft) platform was renovated.

== Notable people ==
- Mukhtar Ablyazov (born 1963), businessman, Minister of Energy, Industry and Trade in 1998–1999, chairman of BTA Bank and leader of the opposition movement Democratic Choice of Kazakhstan
- Konstantin Gritsynin (1905–1943), Hero of the Soviet Union
- Kerimbek Dzhanturov (born 1929), Hero of Socialist Labour (1948)
- Pyotr Levchenko (1895–1958), Hero of Socialist Labour (1948)
