= Kazakhstan's 25th electoral district =

Single-mandate territorial constituency in Kazakhstan

Electoral district No. 25
- Kazakh: №25 сайлау округі Russian: Избирательный округ №25
- Single-mandate constituency for the Mäjilis
- District: Otyrar, Ordabasy, Shardara and Sauran
- Region: East Kazakhstan Region (2004–2007); Turkistan Region (2022–present)
- Population: 666,115 (2023)
- Major settlements: Turkistan (seat) and Arys

Current constituency
- Created: 2004; 2022 (re-established)
- Seats: 1
- Party: Amanat
- Deputy: Qairat Balabiev
- Elected: 2023

The Electoral district No. 25 (Kazakh: №25 сайлау округі, romanized: №25 sailau okrugı; Russian: Избирательный округ №25) is a single-mandate territorial constituency in Kazakhstan, represented in the lower chamber Mäjilis of the Parliament. It is one of three constituencies within the Turkistan Region as its seat is centered in Turkistan, which includes the regional districts of Otyrar, Ordabasy, Shardara, and Sauran.

The constituency was originally formed for the 2004 legislative election and existed until being abolished in 2007. However, it has been reestablished in 2022 and is currently represented by deputy Qairat Balabiev (Amanat) since March 2023.

== Geography ==
The Electoral district No. 25 is situated in the territory of Turkistan Region which includes the districts of Otyrar, Ordabasy, Shardara, and Sauran. Its administrative center, Turkistan, serves as the seat of the constituency. The electoral district shares borders with No. 26 (Turkistan Region) to the northeast, No. 21 (Kyzylorda Region) to the west, and No. 27 (Turkistan Region) to the southeast.

== History ==
The Electoral district No. 25 was formed for the 2004 legislative election as a result of redistribution originally within the boundaries of East Kazakhstan Region, and Nurtai Sabilianov served as deputy from the constituency. From there, the electoral district continued to exist until its dissolution following the 2007 amendment, which led to the abolition of all constituencies as part of the transition from a mixed-member majoritarian representation to a fully party-list proportional representation system. The change affected the composition of all seats in the lower chamber Mäjilis of the Kazakh Parliament beginning with the 2007 legislative election.

In December 2022, the Electoral district No. 25 was reestablished by the Central Election Commission in the territory of Turkistan Region, which came into effect on 1 January 2023 as a result of the 2022 amendment. The adoption of this amendment marked the reintroduction of a mixed electoral system for electing Mäjilis deputies, with the use of numbered constituencies being reinstated for the first time since 2004. It made its debut in the 2023 legislative election, with Qairat Balabiev becoming the elected representative of the constituency.

== Deputies ==
Election	Member	Party	%	Representing region
2004	Nurtai Sabilianov	Otan	62.7	East Kazakhstan Region
2007	Defunct (Single-nationwide PR constituency)			
2012	Defunct (Single-nationwide PR constituency)			
2016	Defunct (Single-nationwide PR constituency)			
2021	Defunct (Single-nationwide PR constituency)			
2023	Qairat Balabiev	Amanat	73.5	Turkistan Region

== Election results ==
=== 2023 ===
Candidate	Party	Votes	%
Qairat Balabiev	Amanat	142,595	73.50
Hudaişuqyr Abdullaev	Independent	30,811	15.88
Säken Törejanov	Independent	10,142	5.23
Janar Aqylbekova	Independent	8,101	4.18
Against all		2,350	1.21
Total		193,999	100.00
Valid votes		193,999	97.00
Invalid/blank votes		5,990	3.00
Total votes		199,989	100.00
Amanat gain			
Source: CEC
