= Districts of Kazakhstan =

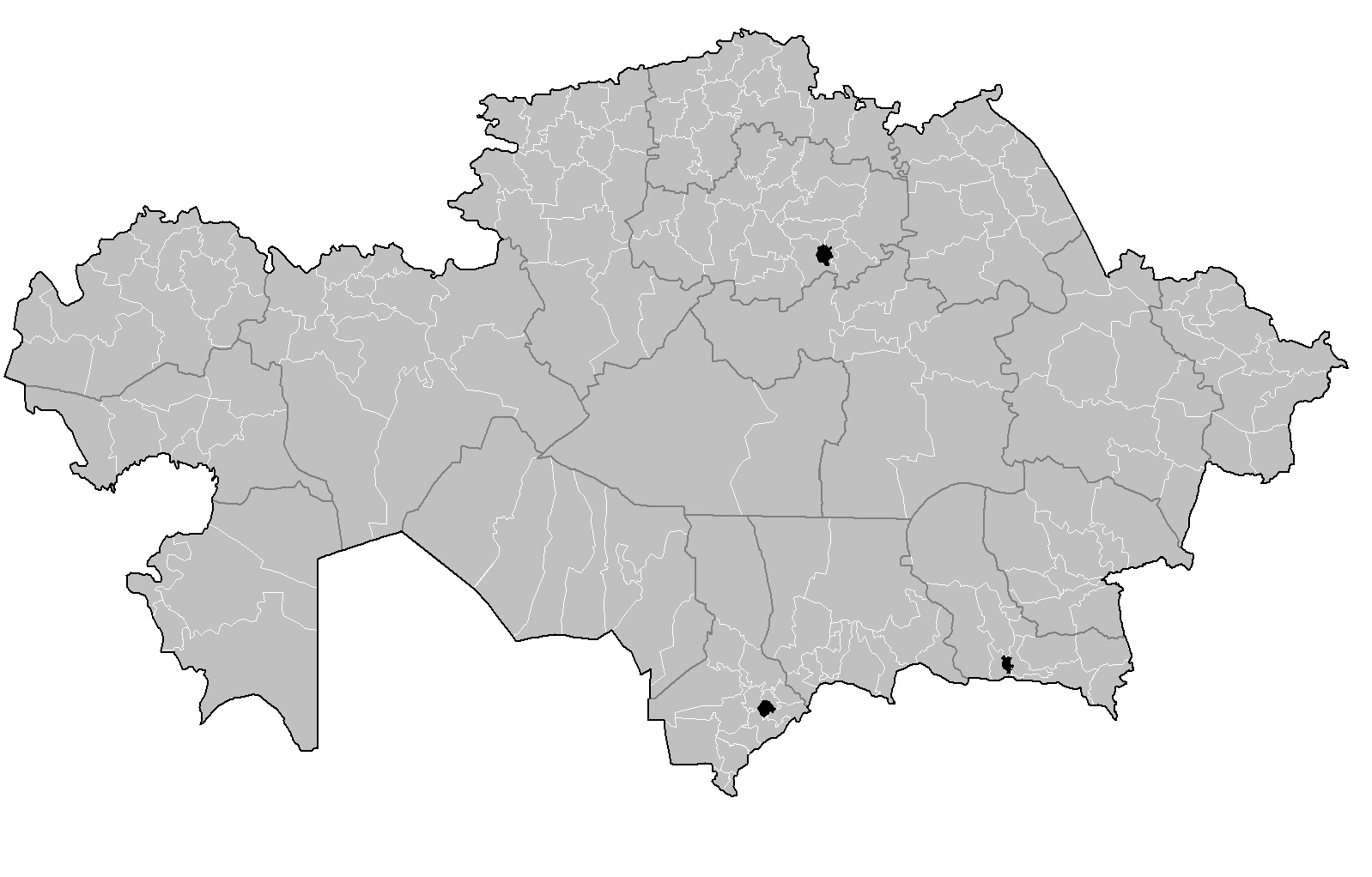
Districts of Kazakhstan

The regions of Kazakhstan are divided into 170 districts. (Note: Kazakh: аудандар, romanized: audandar; sing. аудан, audan; Russian: районы, romanized: raiony; sing. район, raion) The districts are listed below, by region:

== List of districts ==
Districts of Kazakhstan
| District | Kazakh name | Region | Population 2023 | Area, thousand km^{2} | Administrative center | Founded | Footnotes |
|---|---|---|---|---|---|---|---|
| Abai | Абай | Abai | 14,058 | 20.093 | Karaul | 1928 | |
| Aksuat | Ақсуат | Abai | 19,735 | 13.6 | Aksuat | | |
| Ayagoz | Аягөз | Abai | 66,239 | 49.588 | Ayagoz | 1928 | |
| Beskaragay | Басқарағай | Abai | 17,863 | 11.4 | Beskaragay | 1926 | |
| Borodulikha | Бородулиха | Abai | 33,241 | 7.2 | Borodulikha | 1944 | |
| Kokpekti | Көкпекті | Abai | 13,636 | 9.1 | Kokpekti | 1930 | |
| Makanshi | Мақаншы | Abai | – (Note: The districts of Zhanasemey and Makanshi were created after the 2023 census, thus its population number is unknown. The statistics for the Urzhar District may have been affected by the creation of the Makanshi District.) | 9.2 | Makanshi | 2024 | |
| Urzhar | Үржар | Abai | 69,680 | 9 | Urzhar | 1928 | |
| Zhanasemey | Жаңасемей | Abai | – | 23.4 | Semey | 2024 | |
| Zharma | Жарма | Abai | 36,518 | 23.4 | Kalbatau | 1928 | |
| Akkol | Ақкөл | Akmola | 24,338 | 9.4 | Akkol | 1930 | |
| Arshaly | Аршалы | Akmola | 24,920 | 5.8 | Arshaly | 1930 | |
| Astrakhan | Астрахан | Akmola | 19,949 | 7.4 | Astrakhanka | 1930 | |
| Atbasar | Астрахан | Akmola | 43,525 | 7.4 | Atbasar | 1928 | |
| Birzhan sal | Біржан сал | Akmola | 13,229 | 11.4 | Stepnyak | 1932 | |
| Bulandy | Бұланды | Akmola | 29,356 | 6.4 | Makinsk | 1930 | |
| Burabay | Бурабай | Akmola | 71,414 | 5.9 | Shchuchinsk | 1932 | |
| Egindikol | Егіндікөл | Akmola | 5,326 | 2.1 | Egindikol | 1932 | |
| Ereymentau | Ерейментау | Akmola | 26,187 | 17.5 | Ereymentau | 1928 | |
| Esil | Есіл | Akmola | 20,859 | 8 | Esil | 1936 | |
| Korgalzhyn | Қорғалжын | Akmola | 7,303 | 9.3 | Esil | 1918 | |
| Sandyktau | Сандықтау | Akmola | 16,993 | 6.4 | Balkashino | 1936 | |
| Shortandy | Шортанды | Akmola | 27,549 | 4.7 | Balkashino | 1944 | |
| Tselinograd | Целиноград | Akmola | 81,803 | 7.8 | Akmol | 1936 | |
| Zerendi | Зеренді | Akmola | 35,078 | 7.8 | Akmol | 1936 | |
| Zhaksy | Жақсы | Akmola | 16,095 | 9.6 | Akmol | 1957 | |
| Zharkain | Жарқайың | Akmola | 12,827 | 12.1 | Derzhavinsk | 1955 | |
| Alga | Алға | Aktobe | 43,355 | 7.5 | Alga | 1933 | |
| Ayteke Bi | Әйтеке би | Aktobe | 20,791 | 36.8 | Temirbek Zhurgenov | 1966 | |
| Bayganin | Байғанин | Aktobe | 22,882 | 61 | Karauilkeldy | 1928 | |
| Kargaly | Қарғалы | Aktobe | 15,370 | 5 | Badamsha | 1934 | |
| Kobda | Қобда | Aktobe | 15,977 | 14 | Kobda | 1929 | |
| Khromtau | Хромтау | Aktobe | 46,321 | 12.9 | Khromtau | 1935 | |
| Martuk | Мәртөк | Aktobe | 29,608 | 6.6 | Martuk | 1935 | |
| Mugalzhar | Мұғалжар | Aktobe | 65,490 | 29.53 | Kandyagash | 1928 | |
| Oiyl | Ойыл | Aktobe | 16,088 | 11.5 | Oiyl | 1930 | |
| Shalkar | Шалқар | Aktobe | 42,575 | 62.2 | Shalkar | 1932 | |
| Temir | Темір | Aktobe | 35,789 | 12.6 | Shubarkuduk | 1972 | |
| Yrgyz | Ырғыз | Aktobe | 13,974 | 41.5 | Yrgyz | 1928 | |
| Balkhash | Балқаш | Almaty | 28,816 | 37.4 | Bakanas | 1932 | |
| Enbekshikazakh | Еңбекшіқазақ | Almaty | 284,334 | 8.3 | Esik | 1928 | |
| Ile | Іле | Almaty | 266,677 | 7.8 | Otegen Batyr | 1969 | |
| Karasay | Қарасай | Almaty | 326,547 | 2.3 | Kaskelen | 1929 | |
| Kegen | Кеген | Almaty | 28,323 | 7.1 | Kegen | 2018 | |
| Raiymbek | Райымбек | Almaty | 29,200 | 14.2 | Narynkol | 1936 | |
| Talgar | Талғар | Almaty | 240,022 | 3.7 | Talgar | 1969 | |
| Uygur | Ұйғыр | Almaty | 63,533 | 8.7 | Chundzha | 1934 | |
| Zhambyl | Жамбыл | Almaty | 168,019 | 19.3 | Uzynagash | 1928 | |
| Inder | Индер | Atyrau | 32,826 | 10.9 | Inderbor | 1964 | |
| Isatay | Исатай | Atyrau | 26,545 | 14.7 | Akkystau | 1990 | |
| Kurmangazy | Құрманғазы | Atyrau | 56,118 | 20.8 | Kurmangazy | 1928 | |
| Kyzylkoga | Қызылқоға | Atyrau | 30,734 | 20.6 | Miyaly | 1944 | |
| Makat | Мақат | Atyrau | 29,635 | 4.9 | Makat | 1990 | |
| Makhambet | Махамбет | Atyrau | 29,187 | 9.6 | Makhambet | 1928 | |
| Zhylyoi | Жылыой | Atyrau | 86,367 | 29.4 | Kulsary | 1928 | |
| Altai | Алтай | East Kazakhstan | 61,411 | 10.5 | Altai | 1928 | |
| Glubokoye | Глубокое | East Kazakhstan | 56,976 | 7.3 | Glubokoye | 1964 | |
| Katonkaragay | Глубокое | East Kazakhstan | 21,297 (Note: The districts of Ulken Naryn and Markakol did not exist at the time of the 2023 census, which may affect the population number of the Katonkaragay and Katonkaragay districts.) | 13.167 | Katonkaragay | 1928 | |
| Kurshim | Күршім | East Kazakhstan | 22,380 | 23.2 | Kurshim | 1927 | |
| Markakol | Марқакөл | East Kazakhstan | – | 11 | Markakol | 2024 | |
| Samar | Самар | East Kazakhstan | 11,934 | 5.5 | Samar | 2022 | |
| Shemonaikha | Шемонаиха | East Kazakhstan | 42,081 | 4 | Kurshim | 1928 | |
| Tarbagatay | Тарбағатай | East Kazakhstan | 19,324 | 23.7 | Akzhar | 1928 | |
| Ulan | Ұлан | East Kazakhstan | 34,005 | 9.16 | Kassym Kaisenov | 1928 | |
| Ulken Naryn | Үлкен Нарын | East Kazakhstan | – | 3.8 | Ulken Naryn | 2024 | |
| Zaisan | Зайсан | East Kazakhstan | 36,062 | 10.5 | Zaisan | 1928 | |
| Bayzak | Байзақ | Jambyl | 105,654 | 4.5 | Sarykemer | 1938 | |
| Jambyl | Жамбыл | Jambyl | 87,638 | 4.3 | Asy | 1928 | |
| Jualy | Жуалы | Jambyl | 54,586 | 4.2 | Bauyrjan Momyshuly | 1928 | |
| Korday | Қордай | Jambyl | 158,538 | 8.9 | Korday | 1928 | |
| Merke | Мерке | Jambyl | 88,633 | 7.1 | Merki | 1933 | |
| Moiynkum | Мойынқұм | Jambyl | 28,663 | 50.4 | Moiynkum | 1964 | |
| Sarysu | Сарысу | Jambyl | 44,146 | 31.3 | Janatas | 1928 | |
| Shu | Шу | Jambyl | 106,325 | 12 | Tole Bi | 1928 | |
| Talas | Талас | Jambyl | 48,983 | 12.2 | Karatau | 1928 | |
| Turar Ryskulov | Тұрар Рысқұлов | Jambyl | 67,533 | 10.5 | Kulan | 1938 | |
| Aksu | Ақсу | Jetisu | 37,294 | 12.6 | Zhansugirov | 1930 | |
| Alakol | Алакөл | Jetisu | 75,204 | 23.7 | Usharal | 1928 | |
| Eskeldi | Ескелді | Jetisu | 52,368 | 4.3 | Karabulak | 1928 | |
| Karatal | Қаратал | Jetisu | 40,365 | 24.2 | Ushtobe | 1928 | |
| Kerbulak | Кербұлақ | Jetisu | 44,600 | 11.5 | Sary-Ozek | 1973 | |
| Koksu | Көксу | Jetisu | 42,157 | 7.1 | Balpyk Bi | 1944 | |
| Panfilov | Панфилов | Jetisu | 133,831 | 10.6 | Zharkent | 1928 | |
| Sarkant | Сарқан | Jetisu | 39,898 | 24.4 | Sarkand | 1928 | |
| Abay | Абай | Karaganda | 59,000 | 6.5 | Abay | 1973 | |
| Aktogay | Ақтоғай | Karaganda | 15,982 | 52 | Aktogay | 1928 | |
| Bukhar-Zhyrau | Бұхар жырау | Karaganda | 53,606 | 14.576 | Botakara | 1938 | |
| Karkaraly | Қарқаралы | Karaganda | 30,851 | 53.6 | Karkaraly | 1930 | |
| Nura | Нұра | Karaganda | 22,363 | 46.3 | Nura | 1928 | |
| Sarybel | Сарыбел | Karaganda | 30,253 | 11.2 | Osakarovka | 1940 | |
| Shet | Шет | Karaganda | 37,955 | 65.694 | Aksu-Ayuly | 1928 | |
| Altynsarin | Алтынсарин | Kostanay | 12,430 | 6.4 | Obagan | 1985 | |
| Amangeldi | Амангелді | Kostanay | 13,452 | 22.6 | Amangeldi | 1928 | |
| Auliekol | Әулиекөл | Kostanay | 34,843 | 11.1 | Auliekol | 1928 | |
| Beimbet Mailin | Бейімбет Майлин | Kostanay | 22,892 | 7.6 | Ayet | 1936 | |
| Denisov | Денисов | Kostanay | 16,497 | 6.8 | Denisovka | 1938 | |
| Fyodorov | Фёдоров | Kostanay | 24,007 | 7.2 | Fyodorovka | 1928 | |
| Kamysty | Қамысты | Kostanay | 10,876 | 12.1 | Kamysty | 1955 | |
| Karabalyk | Қарабалық | Kostanay | 24,521 | 6.9 | Karabalyk | 1928 | |
| Karasu | Қарасу | Kostanay | 20,544 | 12.8 | Karasu | 1939 | |
| Kostanay | Қостанай | Kostanay | 73,157 | 7.5 | Tobyl | 1963 | |
| Mendykara | Меңдіқара | Kostanay | 22,100 | 6.61 | Borovskoy | 1930 | |
| Nauyrzym | Науырзым | Kostanay | 9,193 | 15.2 | Karamendy | 1964 | |
| Sarykol | Сарыкөл | Kostanay | 17,488 | 6.116 | Sarykol | 1936 | |
| Uzunkol | Ұзынкөл | Kostanay | 15,247 | 7.157 | Uzunkol | 1939 | |
| Zhangeldi | Жангелді | Kostanay | 10,759 | 37.6 | Torgay | 1928 | |
| Zhitikara | Жітіқара | Kostanay | 42,611 | 7.312 | Jitiqara | 1928 | |
| Aral | Арал | Kyzylorda | 78,687 | 68.4 | Aral | 1928 | |
| Jalagash | Жалағаш | Kyzylorda | 35,925 | 27.1 | Jalagash | 1939 | |
| Janakorgan | Жаңақорған | Kyzylorda | 80,522 | 16.6 | Zhanakorgan | 1928 | |
| Karmakshy | Қармақшы | Kyzylorda | 52,087 | 31 | Josaly | 1928 | |
| Kazaly | Қазалы | Kyzylorda | 78,614 | 37.4 | Kazaly | 1928 | |
| Shieli | Шиелі | Kyzylorda | 85,271 | 34.3 | Shieli | 1938 | |
| Syrdariya | Сырдария | Kyzylorda | 37,851 | 39.1 | Shieli | 1938 | |
| Beyneu | Бейнеу | Mangystau | 72,484 | 40.519 | Beyneu | 1973 | |
| Karakiya | Қарақия | Mangystau | 36,737 | 64.297 | Kuryk | 1973 | |
| Mangystau | Маңғыстау | Mangystau | 35,334 | 47 | Shetpe | 1928 | |
| Munaily | Мұнайлы | Mangystau | 163,691 | 4.922 | Mangistau | 1928 | |
| Tupkaragan | Түпқараған | Mangystau | 39,052 | 8.1 | Fort-Shevchenko | 1992 | |
| Aiyrtau | Айыртау | North Kazakhstan | 32,638 | 9.62 | Saumalkol | 1928 | |
| Akkayin | Аққайың | North Kazakhstan | 18,146 | 4.71 | Smirnovo | 1928 | |
| Akzhar | Ақжар | North Kazakhstan | 13,465 | 8.04 | Smirnovo | 1973 | |
| Esil | Есіл | North Kazakhstan | 21,279 | 5.14 | Yavlenka | 1928 | |
| Gabit Musirepov | Ғабит Мүсірепов | North Kazakhstan | 35,723 | 11.09 | Novoishim | 1969 | |
| Kyzylzhar | Қызылжар | North Kazakhstan | 46,499 | 6.15 | Beskol | 1967 | |
| Magzhan Zhumabayev | Мағжан Жұмабаев | North Kazakhstan | 27,328 | 7.81 | Bulayevo | 1928 | |
| Mamlyut | Мамлют | North Kazakhstan | 17,530 | 4.1 | Mamlyut | 1932 | |
| Shal akyn | Шал ақын | North Kazakhstan | 17,916 | 4.841 | Sergeyev | 1928 | |
| Taiynsha | Тайынша | North Kazakhstan | 40,315 | 11.43 | Taiynsha | 1934 | |
| Timiryazev | Тимирязев | North Kazakhstan | 9,869 | 4.51 | Timiryazevo | 1963 | |
| Ualikhanov | Уәлиханов | North Kazakhstan | 13,170 | 12.876 | Kishkenekol | 1928 | |
| Zhambyl | Жамбыл | North Kazakhstan | 18,102 | 7.47 | Presnovka | 1970 | |
| Akkuly | Аққулы | Pavlodar | 12,493 | 8.1 | Akkuly | 1939 | |
| Aktogay | Аққулы | Pavlodar | 12,858 | 9.8 | Aktogay | 1938 | |
| Bayanaul | Баянауыл | Pavlodar | 23,717 | 18.5 | Bayanaul | 1928 | |
| Ertis | Ертіс | Pavlodar | 17,007 | 10.2 | Ertis | 1938 | |
| Terengkol | Тереңкөл | Pavlodar | 19,943 | 6.8 | Terengkol | 1963 | |
| May | Май | Pavlodar | 10,453 | 18.1 | Koktobe | 1939 | |
| Pavlodar | Павлодар | Pavlodar | 26,691 | 6.1 | Pavlodar | 1928 | |
| Sharbakty | Шарбақты | Pavlodar | 18,981 | 6.9 | Sharbakty | 1928 | |
| Uspen | Успен | Pavlodar | 12,529 | 5.5 | Uspenka | 1928 | |
| Zhelezin | Железин | Pavlodar | 15,222 | 7.7 | Zhelezinka | 1938 | |
| Baydibek | Бәйдібек | Turkistan | 48,893 | 7.2 | Shayan | 1928 | |
| Kazygurt | Қазығұрт | Turkistan | 116,335 | 4.1 | Kazygurt | 1928 | |
| Keles | Келес | Turkistan | 133,753 | 3.451 | Abai | 2018 | |
| Maktaaral | Мақтаарал | Turkistan | 129,113 | 0.808 | Myrzakent | 1928 | |
| Ordabasy | Ордабасы | Turkistan | 127,719 | 2.7 | Temirlan | 1964 | |
| Otyrar | Отырар | Turkistan | 51,640 | 16.757 | Shauildir | 1928 | |
| Saryagash | Сарыағаш | Turkistan | 218,998 | 4.181 | Saryagash | 1939 | |
| Sayram | Сайрам | Turkistan | 231,914 | 1.148 | Aksukent | 1928 | |
| Sauran | Сауран | Turkistan | 100,163 | 7.217 | Shornak | 2021 | |
| Shardara | Шардара | Turkistan | 84,315 | 13 | Shardara | 1964 | |
| Sozak | Созақ | Turkistan | 63,055 | 41 | Sholakkorgan | 1928 | |
| Tole Bi | Төле би | Turkistan | 120,909 | 3.1 | Lenger | 1932 | |
| Tulkibas | Түлкібас | Turkistan | 106,342 | 2.3 | Turar Ryskulov | 1928 | |
| Zhetisay | Жетісай | Turkistan | 187,384 | 1.046 | Zhetisay | 2018 | |
| Ulytau | Ұлытау | Ulytau | 11,228 | 121.694 | Ulytau | 1939 | |
| Zhanaarka | Жаңаарқа | Ulytau | 31,119 | 50.9 | Zhanaarka | 1928 | |
| Akzhaik | Ақжайық | West Kazakhstan | 36,037 | 45.5 | Chapaev | 1928 | |
| Bayterek | Бәйтерек | West Kazakhstan | 60,040 | 7.421 | Peremyotnoye | 1939 | |
| Bokey Orda | Бөкей Орда | West Kazakhstan | 14,425 | 19.2 | Saykyn | | |
| Borili | Бөрілі | West Kazakhstan | 58,290 | 5.6 | Saykyn | 1935 | |
| Karatobe | Қаратөбе | West Kazakhstan | 13,616 | 10 | Karatobe | 1928 | |
| Kaztalov | Қазталов | West Kazakhstan | 27,407 | 18.606 | Kaztalovka | 1928 | |
| Shyngyrlau | Шыңғырлау | West Kazakhstan | 13,044 | 7.2 | Shyngyrlau | | |
| Syrym | Сырым | West Kazakhstan | 17,281 | 11.9 | Zhympity | 1928 | |
| Taskala | Тасқала | West Kazakhstan | 16,276 | 8 | Taskala | 1933 | |
| Terekti | Теректі | West Kazakhstan | 39,019 | 7.968 | Terekti | 1933 | |
| Zhanakala | Жаңақала | West Kazakhstan | 21,653 | 20.8 | Zhanakala | 1930 | |
| Zhanybek | Жәнібек | West Kazakhstan | 14,512 | 8.2 | Zhanybek | 1922 | |

== See also ==
- Regions of Kazakhstan
