= Myrzageldy Kemel =

Kazakh writer (1949–2020)

Myrzageldı Kemel
- Мырзагелді Кемел

Member of the Mäjilis
- In office 1995–2004

Member of the Supreme Council of Kazakhstan
- In office 1994–1994

Personal details
- Born: 15 January 1949 Maktaaral District, Chimkent Oblast, Kazakh SSR, Soviet Union
- Died: 18 July 2020 (aged 71)
- Education: Tashkent Institute of Irrigation and Agricultural Mechanization Engineers; Dulati Zhambyl University, Faculty of Law; Academy of Public Administration under the President of Kazakhstan

Myrzageldı Kemel (Note: Often transliterated as Myrzageldy Kemel through a Russified Romanization of Мырзагельды Кемель.) (Kazakh: Мырзагелді Кемел; 15 January 1949 – 18 July 2020) was a Kazakhstani writer, politician and academic. He was a member of the Supreme Kenges from 1994 to 1995 and a member of the Mazhilis from 1995 to 2004. He published 10 books about spirituality. His best known book was called Mind Pocket (Kazakh: Ақыл қалта).

== Biography ==
Kemel was born in the Maktaaral District of the Chimkent Oblast, now known as the Turkistan Region of the Kazakh S.S.R. In 1971, he graduated from Tashkent Institute of Irrigation and Agricultural Mechanization Engineers with a specialty in rural electrification. He became the director of a Sovkhoz, a state owned farm in 1975 and worked in the role until 1992. At the same time, he was a member of the Communist Party and served in the local Soviet.

In 1994, he was elected as a deputy in the Supreme Council of Kazakhstan. The original vote was invalidated by the Supreme Court of Kazakhstan. In the 1995 Kazakh legislative election, he became a deputy of the Mäjilis, the lower house of the Parliament of Kazakhstan. In 2000, Kemel graduated with a law degree from the Dulati Zhambyl University. In 2004, he earned a PhD in economics. He was a professor at the Academy of Public Administration under the President of Kazakhstan.

== Writer ==
As a professor, he authored over 100 scientific articles. He published two magazines in Kazakhstan, World and Ecology and Sustainable Development. He published ten books related to spirituality. Among his titles were Mind Pocket, Alphabet of Abzaldyk and Lessons for Myself.

== Death ==
Kemel died on 18 July 2020.
