= Tulkibas District =

District of Turkistan Region, Kazakhstan

Tulkibas District Түлкібас ауданы Tyulkubas District
- District
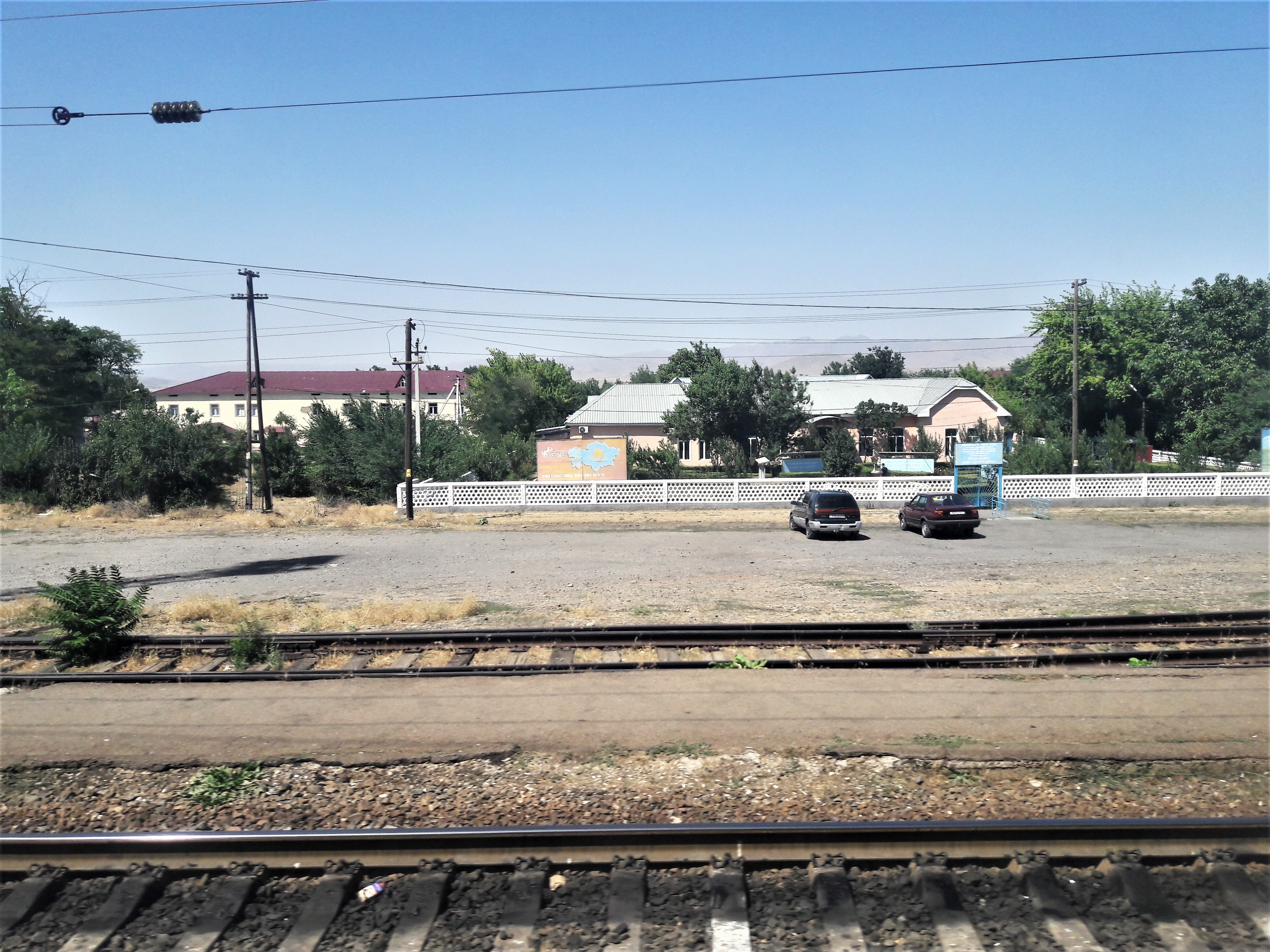
- From top, left to right: spring landscape of the district; Aksu river canyon; tulip field in the Aksu-Zhabagly Nature Reserve; Tulkibas railway station; mountains of the Aksu-Zhabagly reserve

- Seal

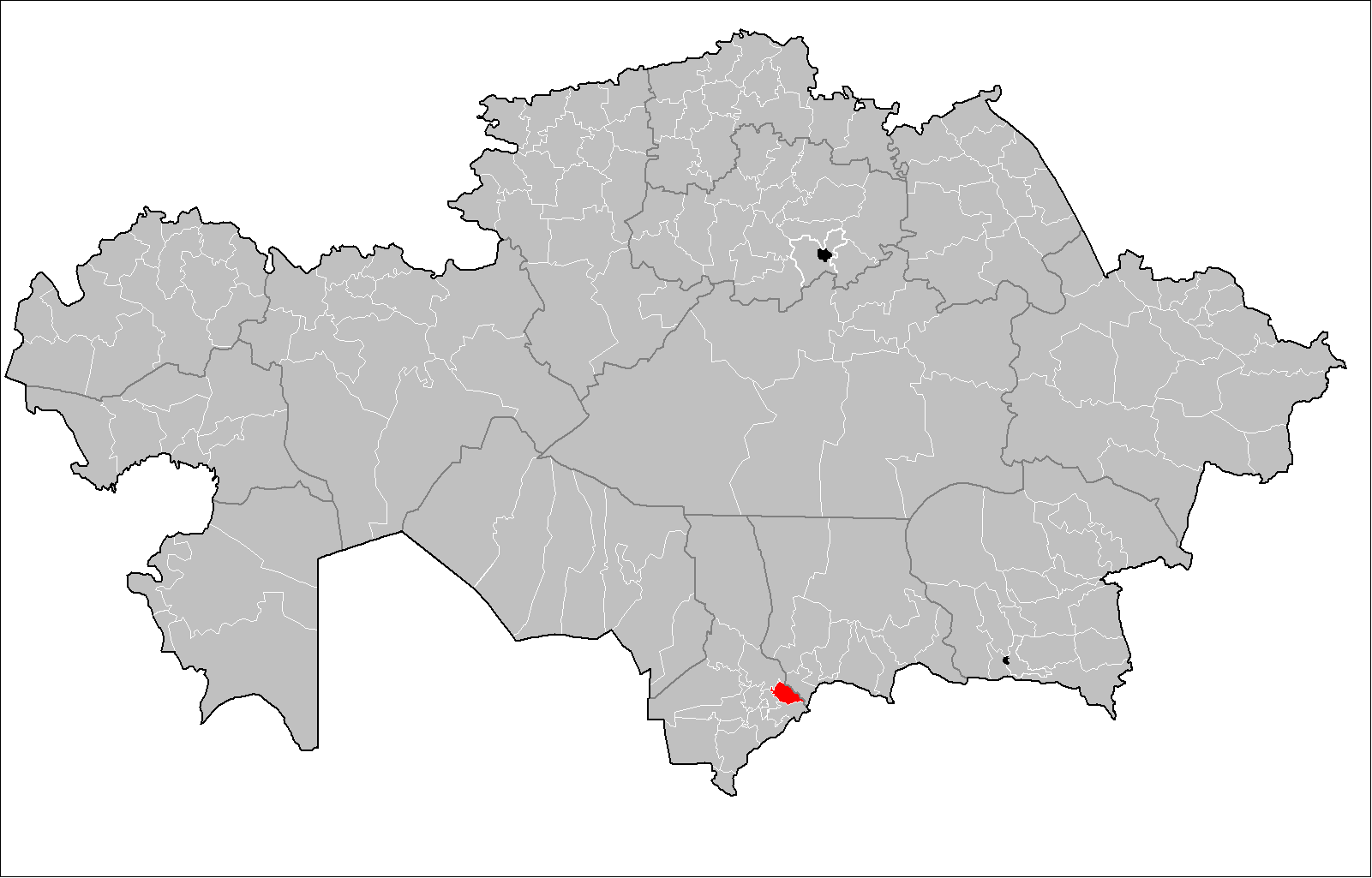
- Location of Tulkibas District in Kazakhstan
- Coordinates: 42°27′43″N 70°20′24″E
- Country: Kazakhstan
- Region: Turkistan Region
- Established: 17 January 1928
- Administrative center: Turar Ryskulov

Government
  - Akim: Askar Yestibayev

Area
  - Total: 2,300 km^{2} (890 sq mi)

Population (1 January 2025)
  - Total: 105,410
  - Density: 46/km^{2} (120/sq mi)
- Time zone: UTC+5
- Postal code: 161300
- Area code: +7 72538
- Website: www.gov.kz/memleket/entities/turkestan-tyulkubas-audany

Tulkibas District or Tyulkubas District (Kazakh: Түлкібас ауданы, romanized: Tülkıbas audany; Russian: Тюлькубасский район, romanized: Tyulkubasskiy rayon) is a district of Turkistan Region in southern Kazakhstan, located in the south-eastern part of the region. The administrative center of the district is the selo of Turar Ryskulov (known as Vannovka until 1993). At the beginning of 2025 the district had a population of 105,410; its territory covers 2,300 km^{2} (890 sq mi).

The district contains part of the Aksu-Zhabagly Nature Reserve, the oldest nature reserve in Kazakhstan and Central Asia, which has been a UNESCO biosphere reserve since 2015 and since 2016 forms part of the transnational World Heritage Site Western Tien-Shan, as well as a branch of the Sayram-Ugam National Park. The economy is based on agriculture, food processing and the production of building materials; a railway with the station of Tulkibas and a section of the Western Europe – Western China transport corridor pass through the district.

== Etymology ==
According to Kazakh-language sources, the name of the district is believed to derive from Türkibas (Türkbasy), interpreted as "head of the Turks", a toponym associated with the Turkic tribes that inhabited the territory in the 6th–13th centuries; the modern form Tülkibas (literally "fox head") is explained by the frequent alternation of the sounds r and l in Kazakh speech. The same view is held by the Kazakh writer Markhabat Baigut, a native of the district.

== History ==
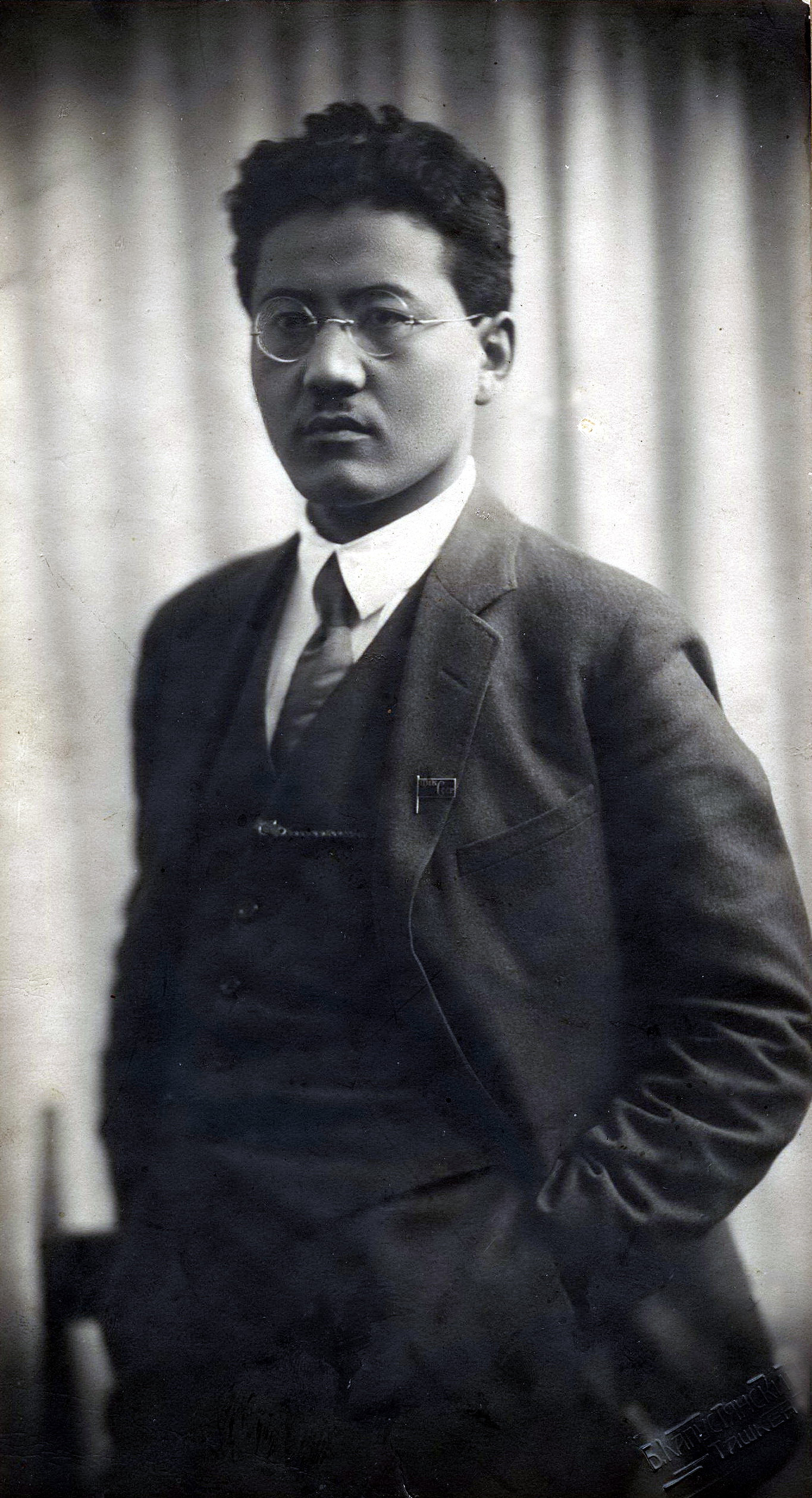
Turar Ryskulov, after whom the district center was renamed in 1993

A meteorological station was opened in 1915 at the railway station settlement of Tulkibas; the first railway station building was erected in 1916.

The district was established on 17 January 1928. In 1930 it was merged into Jualy District; on 9 January 1935 it was included in South Kazakhstan Region with its center in the village of Vannovka. In 1963–1966 the territory formed part of Sayram District. In 1977 the meteorological station was moved from Tulkibas to Vannovka.

On 7 October 1993, by order of the President of Kazakhstan, Vannovka was renamed Turar Ryskulov in honour of the Soviet statesman Turar Ryskulov on the centenary of his birth. On 19 June 2018 South Kazakhstan Region was renamed Turkistan Region and its administrative center was moved from Shymkent to Turkistan. Since 1 March 2024 the district, like the whole of Kazakhstan, has used the single time zone UTC+5.

== Geography ==
Alpine zone of the Aksu-Zhabagly reserve: Kshi-Kaindy pass and Bugulutur mountain

Tulkibas District lies in the south-eastern part of Turkistan Region and covers 2,300 km^{2} (890 sq mi). It borders Tole Bi, Sayram and Baydibek districts of Turkistan Region and Jambyl Region. The southern part of the district includes the mountains of the western end of the Talas Alatau range of the Western Tian Shan, where the Aksu-Zhabagly Nature Reserve is located.

The territory is formed by fan-shaped mountain ridges. The Arys flows through the district; the Mashat river rises in the high mountains and has mixed feeding. Within the reserve the Aksu river has cut the Aksu Canyon, about 30 km (19 mi) long and 300 to 500 m (980 to 1,640 ft) deep, with the distance between its rims reaching 800 m (2,600 ft) in places. The canyon of the Mashat river lies in the Mashat-Daubaba mountains within the Tulkibas branch of the Sayram-Ugam National Park.

=== Climate ===
In agro-climatic terms the district belongs to a very dry and hot sub-zone, with long hot summers and relatively short winters; most of its farmland is rain-fed. Meteorological observations in the district have been conducted since 1915 at the station now named Turar Ryskulov, one of the three oldest weather stations of the former South Kazakhstan Region; observations have been continuous since 1925.

=== Protected areas ===
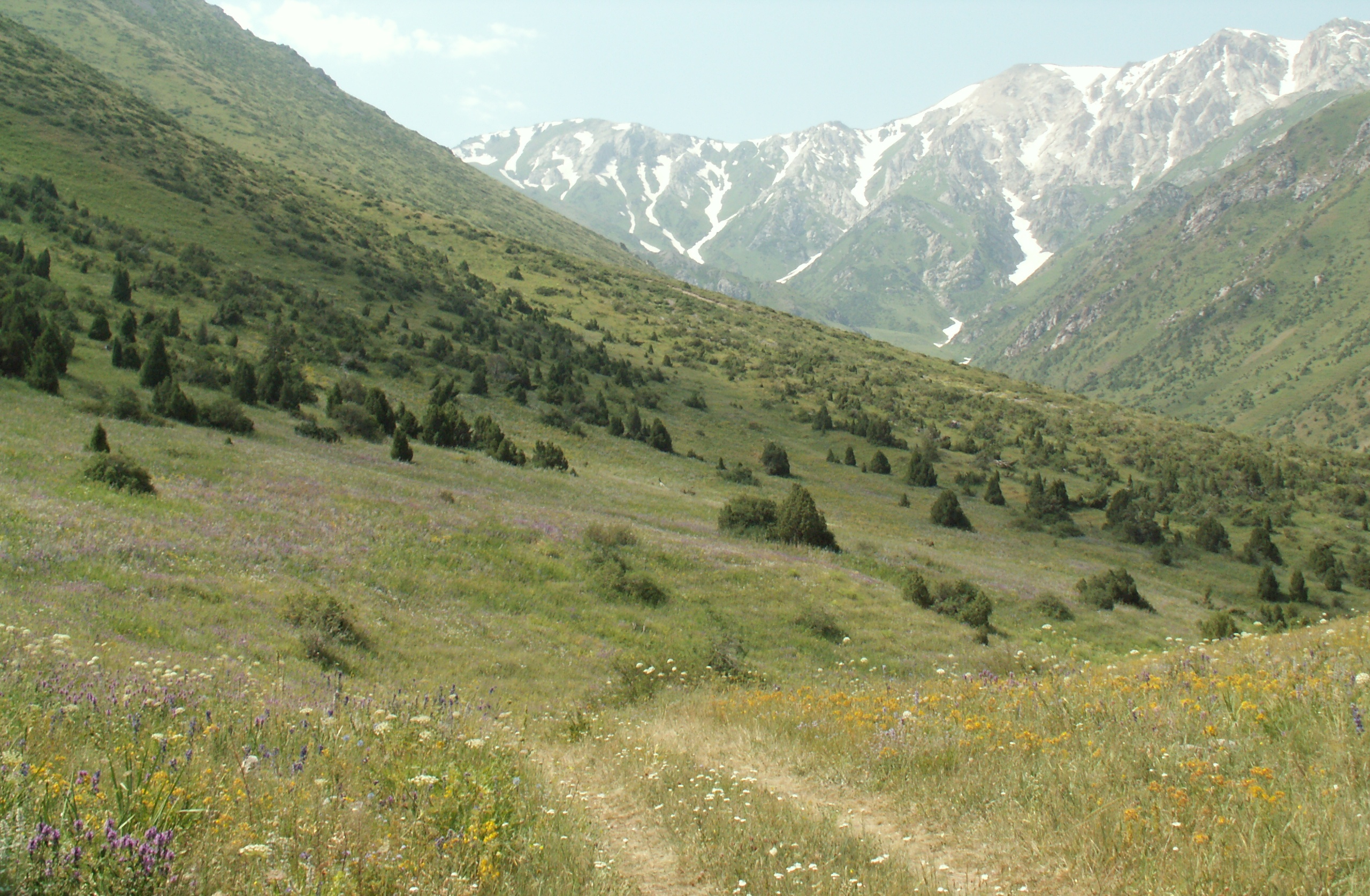
Juniper scrub on the plateau between the Kshi-Kaindy and Ulken-Kaindy gorges

The Aksu-Zhabagly Nature Reserve is the first state nature reserve of Kazakhstan and Central Asia. Work on defining its boundaries began in February 1925; the reserve was established by a resolution of the Council of People's Commissars of the Kazakh ASSR of 14 July 1926 and a resolution of the Council of People's Commissars of the Russian SFSR of 27 May 1927. It lies within Tulkibas, Tole Bi and Baydibek districts of Turkistan Region and Jualy District of Jambyl Region, covering the north-western part of the Talas Alatau and the Ugam range; the reserve also includes the palaeontological sites of Aulie and Karabastau. Its area is 131,934.3 ha.

On 9 June 2015, at the 27th session of the International Co-ordinating Council of UNESCO's Man and the Biosphere Programme, the reserve was included in the World Network of Biosphere Reserves, and on 17 July 2016 the transnational property "Western Tien-Shan", which includes the reserve, was inscribed on the UNESCO World Heritage List. In 2026 the reserve celebrated its centenary; a viewing platform above the Aksu Canyon was opened for the anniversary.

Panorama of the Aksu-Zhabagly Nature Reserve (2022)

Tulipa greigii in the Aksu-Zhabagly reserve

The reserve is home to 299 species of birds, 52 species of mammals, 11 species of reptiles, 3 species of amphibians and 2,124 species of invertebrates; nine animal species are listed in the Red Book of Kazakhstan, among them the Tian Shan brown bear, the snow leopard, the Turkestan lynx, the Indian crested porcupine and the Tian Shan argali. The flora comprises 1,312 species of higher plants, almost a quarter of the flora of Kazakhstan; 41 species are listed in the Red Book, including Tulipa greigii and Malus sieversii.

The Sayram-Ugam National Park was created by a resolution of the Government of Kazakhstan of 26 January 2006 through the merger of the Ugam, Tole Bi and Tulkibas state institutions for the protection of forests and wildlife. The Tulkibas branch of the park covers 26,971 ha of its total area of 149,037.1 ha and includes the Mashat canyon.

== Demographics ==
Historical population
Year	Pop.	±%
1999	86,465	—
2009	95,468	+10.4%
2013	106,582	+11.6%
2019	111,286	+4.4%
2024	106,600	−4.2%
2025	105,410	−1.1%
Censuses of 1999 and 2009; estimates of 2013, 2019, 2024 and 2025

According to the Bureau of National Statistics, the population of the district at the beginning of 2025 was 105,410; the district administration reported 106,600 inhabitants in 2024. Earlier figures were 106,582 (2013 estimate), 95,468 (2009 census) and 86,465 (1999 census). The average population density is about 46 inhabitants per square kilometre. More than 20 ethnic groups live in the district.

Ethnic composition of the district
Ethnic group	2019, %	2025, persons	2025, %
Kazakhs	82.19	84,361	80.03
Uzbeks	5.08	8,485	8.05
Azerbaijanis	5.97	6,090	5.77
Russians	4.99	3,808	3.61
Ukrainians	0.17	656	0.62
Germans	0.28	355	0.34
Tatars	0.30	310	0.29
Turks	0.23	298	0.28
Others	0.79	1,047	0.99
Total	100.00	105,410	100.00

== Administrative divisions ==
Boundary of Tulkibas District and its main settlements

The district comprises 13 rural districts and 2 settlement districts with 62 rural localities. Sastobe and Tulkibas have the status of settlements.

In December 2024, in agreement with the Presidential Administration and by order of the akim of Turkistan Region, Askar Yestibayev was appointed akim of the district; his candidacy was supported by the deputies of the district maslikhat (council). He succeeded Nurzhan Iztleuov, who had held the post since 2023.

Rural districts:

1. Akbiyik
2. Arys
3. Balykty
4. Zhabagly
5. Zhaskeshu
6. Keltemashat
7. Kemerbastau
8. Mashat
9. Maylykent
10. Michurin
11. Ryskulov
12. Tastumsyk
13. Shakpak

== Economy ==
The main branches of the district's economy are the processing of agricultural products, food production and the manufacture of building materials. The district specialises in dairy and beef cattle breeding, pig farming and poultry farming, and its farms produce 11.3% of the gross agricultural output of the region. About 4,345 enterprises and 3,181 individual entrepreneurs are registered in the district, along with some 2,300 peasant (farm) holdings, of which 86.7% are active. In 2020, 32 enterprises operating in the district produced goods worth 10.3 billion tenge, and investment attracted to the district amounted to 7.7 billion tenge.

=== Agriculture ===
The district is known for horticulture: apples, pears, apricots and grapes have been grown here for decades. In 2020 the area of apple orchards was increased by 760 ha to 3,355 ha and 30,300 tonnes of fruit were harvested; in the same year 76 small livestock sites and 24 family dairy farms were created, and a turkey farm for 600 birds was opened in the Keltemashat rural district.

=== Industry ===
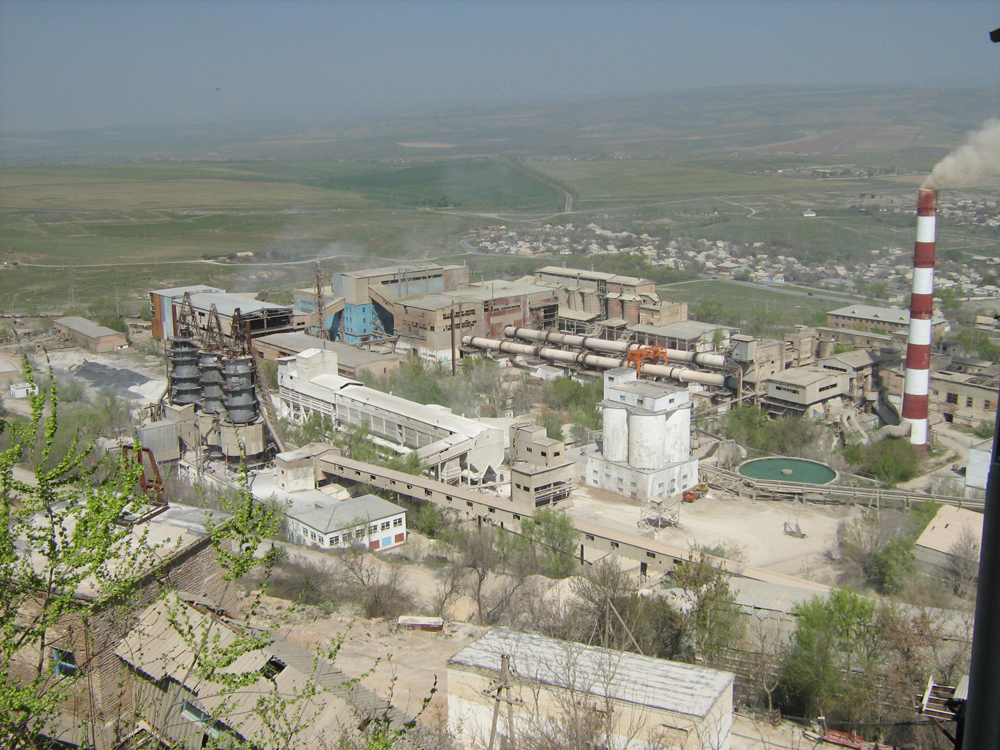
The cement plant at Sastobe (2008)

The largest industrial enterprise of the district is the cement plant in the settlement of Sastobe. In the late 2000s and early 2010s it belonged, as "Sastobe-Cement", to the Russian holding Basel Cement; in 2010 the plant produced 400,000 tonnes of cement. In the 2010s cement and lime were produced by SAS-Tobe Technologies LLP, which in 2018 became the first Kazakh producer accredited on the Uzbek Republican Commodity Exchange.

Construction of a chemical complex, "Innovation Complex Sastobe", with a cost of 180 billion tenge has begun in the district. The plant is designed to produce annually 400,000 tonnes of lime, 200,000 tonnes of calcium carbide, 100,000 tonnes of caustic soda, 120,000 tonnes of polyvinyl chloride and 1 million tonnes of cement; commissioning was planned for 2026, with about 1,000 jobs to be created. In January 2024 the Development Bank of Kazakhstan announced its support for the project through co-financing with other banks.

=== Tourism ===
In 2020 there were 33 tourist facilities operating in the district.

== Transport ==
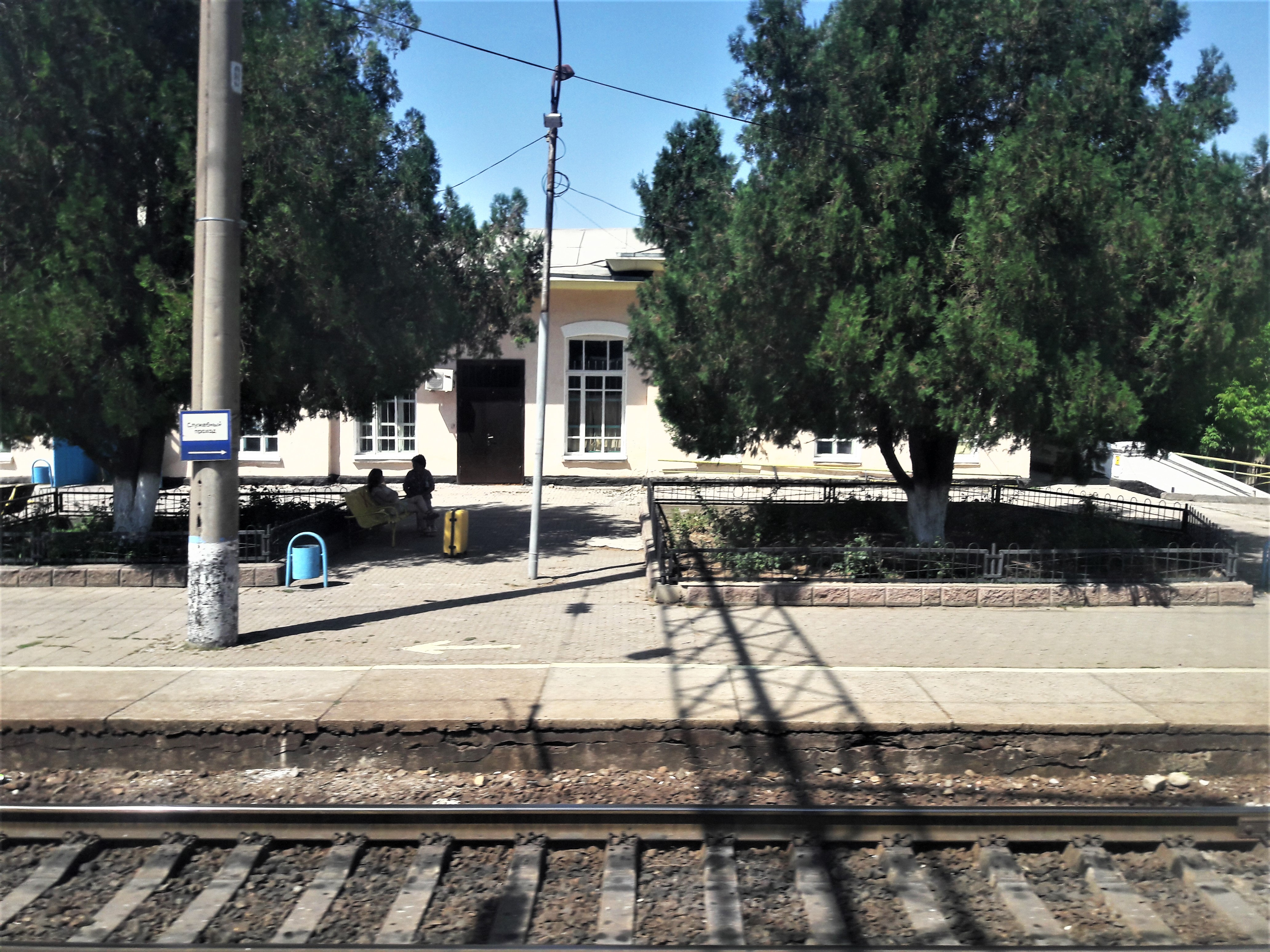
Tulkibas railway station (2021)

A railway runs through the district. The first building of the Tulkibas railway station was erected in 1916; 110 years later it was demolished and replaced by a new two-storey station building designed for about 200 passengers a day with a 90-seat waiting hall; the 540-metre platform was also renovated. About 400–500 people work at the station.

The Western Europe – Western China international transport corridor crosses the district; the Taraz – Shymkent section is a toll road. During the reconstruction of the corridor a road tunnel was built at kilometres 593–632 of the Khorgos – Almaty – Taraz – Shymkent – Tashkent road near the settlement of Shakpak-Baba in Tulkibas District.

== Landmarks ==
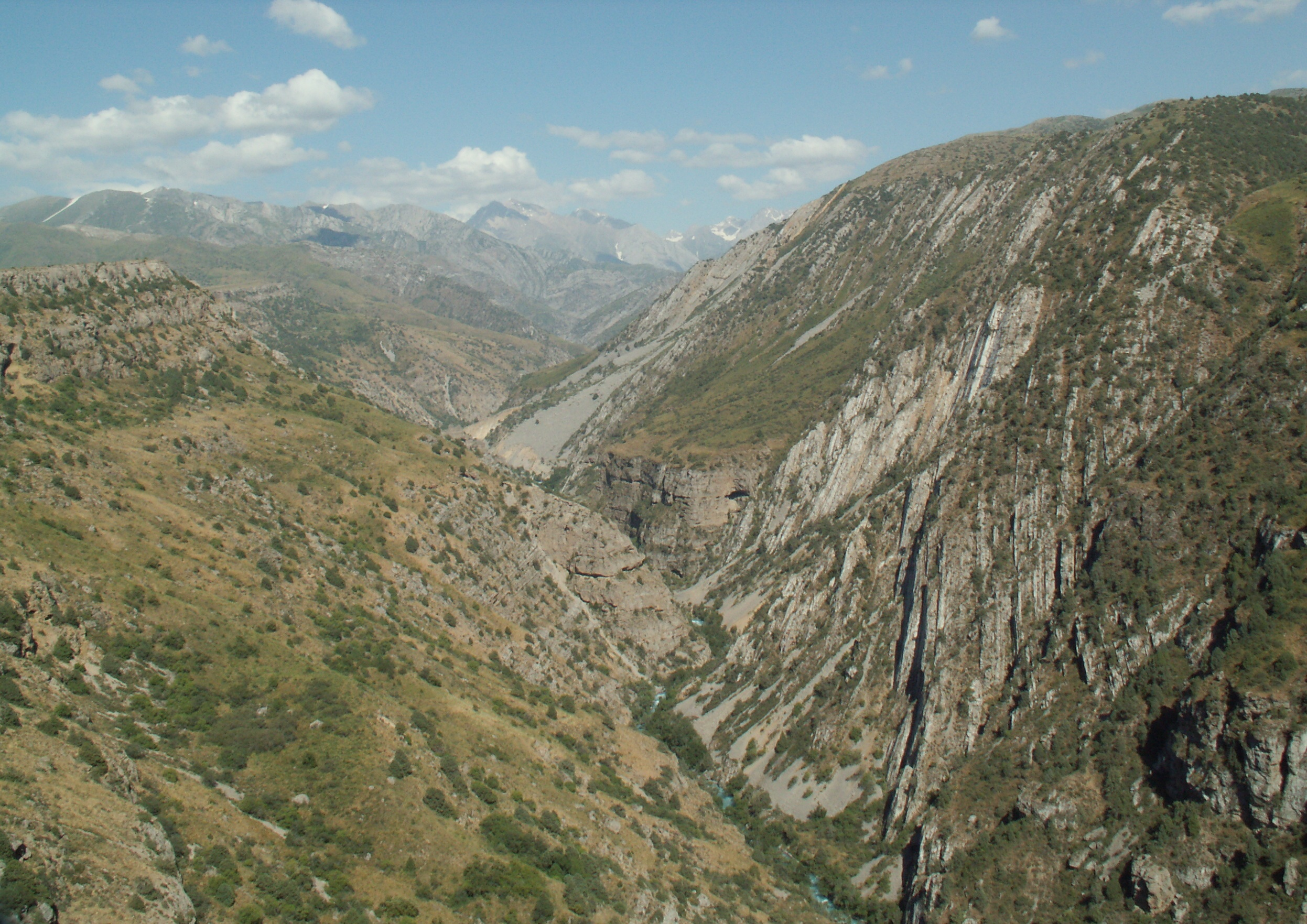
Aksu Canyon

The main attraction of the district is the Aksu-Zhabagly Nature Reserve, established in 1926–1927. A viewing platform above the Aksu Canyon, which stretches for about 30 km, was opened in 2026. Another natural landmark is the canyon of the Mashat river in the Tulkibas branch of the Sayram-Ugam National Park.
