= Konstantin Gritsynin =

Soviet soldier

- Native name: Константин Данилович Грицынин
- Born: 1905; Vannovka, Tulkibas District, Russian Empire
- Died: 1943 (aged 37–38)
- Allegiance: Soviet Union
- Branch: 16th Guards Cavalry Division
- Service years: 1942–1943
- Rank: guard corporal
- Conflicts: World War II
- Awards: Hero of the Soviet Union

Konstantin Danilovich Gritsynin (Russian: Константин Данилович Грицынин) (1905–1943) was a soldier of the Red Army. He was involved in World War II. He was awarded the title Hero of the Soviet Union in 1944.

== Biography ==
Konstantin Gritsynin was born on October 13, 1905, in the village of Vannovka (now the village named after Turar Ryskulov, Tulkibas District, South Kazakhstan region of Kazakhstan) into a peasant family. Ukrainian by nationality. He graduated from elementary school and worked on a collective farm. In August 1942, Gritsynin was called up by the Kaganovichi RVC to serve in the Red Army. From September 1943 he fought on the fronts of the Great Patriotic War. With the rank of guard corporal, he was a telephone operator in the communications platoon of the 60th Guards Cavalry Regiment of the 16th Guards Cavalry Division (former 112th Bashkir Cavalry Division) of the 7th Guards Cavalry Corps of the 61st Army of the Central Front. He distinguished himself during the Battle of the Dnieper.

On September 28, 1943, during the crossing of the Dnieper near the village of Nivki in the Brahin District of the Gomel Region of the Byelorussian SSR, Gritsynin was one of the first to cross to the western bank and provided underwater telephone communications for the squadron, which was the first to cross the river. Advancing along with the squadron, for three days he maintained uninterrupted communication with the regimental headquarters for ten kilometers. On September 30, 1943, in the area of the farm of Galka, a Ferdinand tank destroyer drove right to Gritsinin, which he destroyed with a grenade. In the same battle, he was seriously wounded, but he did not leave the battlefield, continuing to keep uninterrupted communications until he was replaced and sent to the hospital. Gritsynin died from his wounds on October 12, 1943. He was buried in a mass grave in the village of Ripky, Chernihiv Oblast of Ukraine.

Decree of the Presidium of the Supreme Soviet of the USSR "On conferring the title of Hero of the Soviet Union to generals, officers, sergeants and privates of the Red Army" dated January 15, 1944 for "exemplary performance of combat missions of the command on the front against the German invaders and the courage and heroism shown at the same time" guards Corporal Konstantin Gritsynin was posthumously awarded the high title of Hero of the Soviet Union. He was also awarded the Orders of Lenin and the Red Star.

In honor of Gritsinin, streets in his native village and the village of Repki are named.

== Books ==
- пред. ред. коллегии И. Н. Шкадов (1987). Герои Советского Союза: Краткий биографический словарь. Vol. 1 (100.000 экз ed.). Москва: Воениздат. p. 911. (page 376)
- Ахмадиев Т. Х. (1999). Башкирская гвардейская кавалерийская. Уфа.
- под ред. Н. Зверева (1968). Герои Советского Союза — казахстанцы. Vol. 1 (25 600 экз ed.). Алма-Ата: Казахстан. p. 475.
- редкол.: И. П. Шамякин (гл. ред.) и др. (1984). Навечно в сердце народном (3 65 000 экз ed.). Минск: Белорусская советская энциклопедия. p. 607.
- Плесцов К. М. (1962). Люди высокого подвига (65 000 экз ed.). Москва: Белорусская советская энциклопедия.
- Ф.Н.Вахитов, Н.И.Камалова (2005). Слава башкирских конников. Уфа: Китап. p. 57-59.
