= Zhetisay =

City in South Kazakhstan region, Kazakhstan

- City
- Location in Kazakhstan
- Coordinates: 40°46′31″N 68°19′32″E
- Country: Kazakhstan
- Region: Turkistan Region

Population (2009)
  - Total: 36,494

Zhetisay (also transliterated as Jetisay, Žetisaj and Zhetysay; Kazakh: Jetısai, جەتئساي) is a city in Kazakhstan and is the administrative center of Maktaaral District in Turkistan Region. Population: 36,494 (2009 census results); 30,487 (1999 census results).

== Climate ==
Zhetisay has a warm summer Mediterranean climate (Köppen: Csa), characterized by cool winters and very hot, dry summers.

Climate data for Zhetisay (1991–2020)
Month	Jan	Feb	Mar	Apr	May	Jun	Jul	Aug	Sep	Oct	Nov	Dec	Year
Mean daily maximum °C (°F)	5.1 (41.2)	7.9 (46.2)	15.4 (59.7)	22.9 (73.2)	29.6 (85.3)	34.9 (94.8)	36.2 (97.2)	34.5 (94.1)	29.2 (84.6)	22.3 (72.1)	13.3 (55.9)	6.3 (43.3)	21.5 (70.7)
Daily mean °C (°F)	0.6 (33.1)	2.8 (37.0)	9.4 (48.9)	16.0 (60.8)	22.0 (71.6)	26.8 (80.2)	28.0 (82.4)	25.8 (78.4)	20.1 (68.2)	13.4 (56.1)	6.5 (43.7)	1.6 (34.9)	14.4 (57.9)
Mean daily minimum °C (°F)	−2.5 (27.5)	−0.7 (30.7)	5.0 (41.0)	10.3 (50.5)	14.9 (58.8)	18.3 (64.9)	19.3 (66.7)	17.4 (63.3)	11.7 (53.1)	6.1 (43.0)	1.6 (34.9)	−1.7 (28.9)	8.3 (46.9)
Average precipitation mm (inches)	37.6 (1.48)	46.5 (1.83)	47.3 (1.86)	39.5 (1.56)	25.7 (1.01)	7.1 (0.28)	1.4 (0.06)	1.6 (0.06)	2.7 (0.11)	13.3 (0.52)	33.5 (1.32)	39.2 (1.54)	295.4 (11.63)
Average precipitation days (≥ 1.0 mm)	6.6	7.1	7.7	6.1	4.2	1.4	0.4	0.4	0.6	2.2	5.4	6.2	48.3
Source: NOAA
