= Lenger =

- Location in Kazakhstan
- Coordinates: 42°10′55″N 69°53′16″E
- Country: Kazakhstan
- Region: Turkistan

Area
  - Total: 2,047 km^{2} (790 sq mi)

Population (2012)
  - Total: 25,298
- Time zone: UTC+6 (UTC+6)
- Climate: Dsa

Lenger (Kazakh: Леңгір, Leñgır,لەڭگىر; Russian: Ленгер) is a city in Tole Bi District, Turkistan Region of Kazakhstan. As of 2012 Lenger had a population of 25,298. Lenger is the administrative center of the Tole Bi District. The Museum of the Tole Bi District (Музей Толебийского района) is in Lenger. Population: 24,642 (2009 census results); 22,038 (1999 census results).

== Etymology ==
From Persian language it means "Caravan station" or "Sufi almhouse"

== In popular culture ==
- In Command & Conquer: Generals, Lenger serves as a traitorous GLA warlord's base serving Chinese "masters". GLA forces loyal to the Commander were commanded to destroy both traitors and repulse any Chinese allies' attempts to relief the attack.
