= Shardara District =

Coordinates: 41°19′12″N 67°50′24″E

Shardara Шардара
- District
- Шардара ауданы
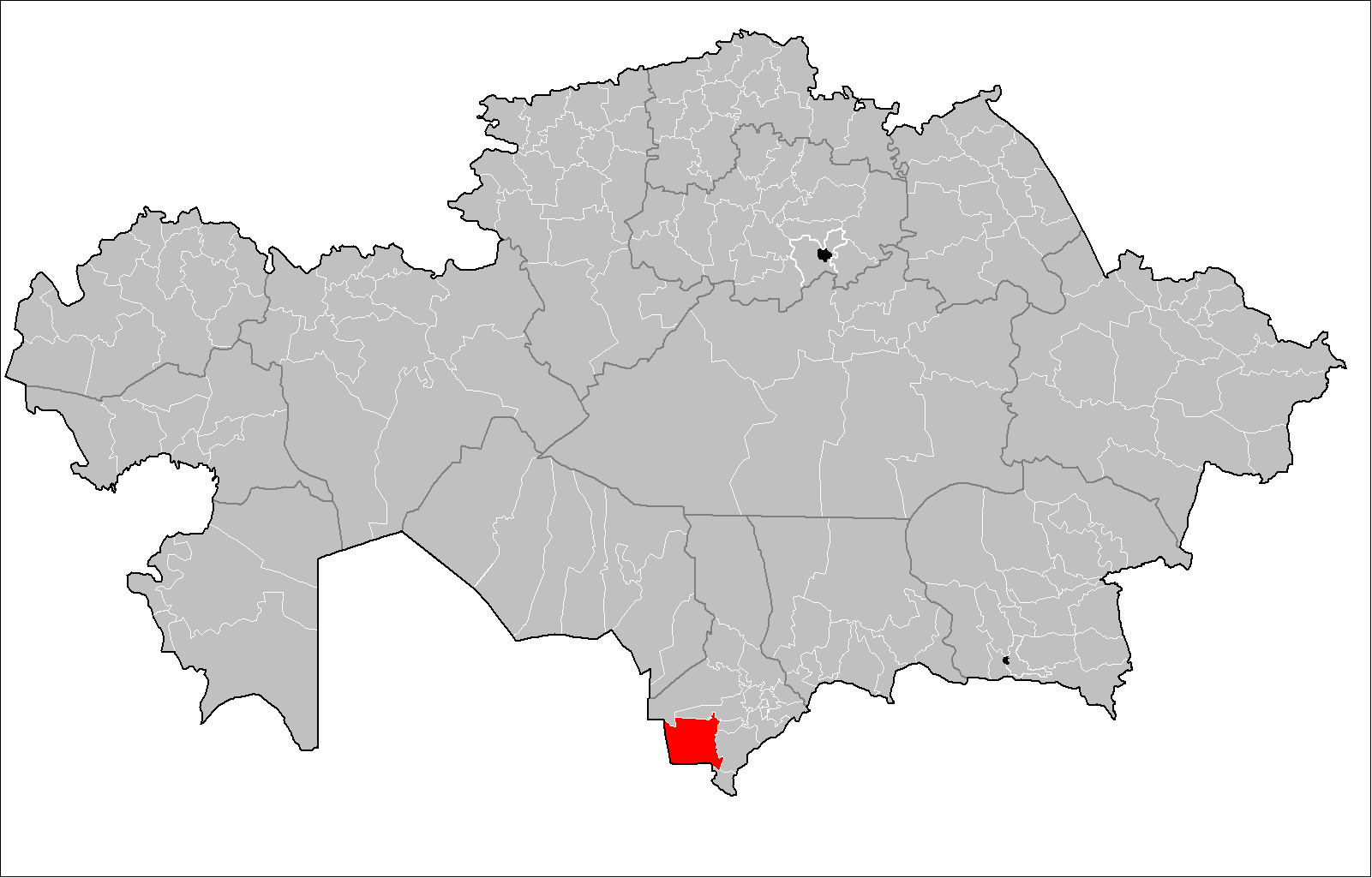
- Country: Kazakhstan
- Region: Turkistan Region
- Administrative center: Shardara

Government
  - Akim: Arman Karsybayev

Population (2013)
  - Total: 78,554
- Time zone: UTC+6 (East)

Shardara (Kazakh: Шардара ауданы, Şardara audany) is a district of Turkistan Region in southern Kazakhstan. The administrative center of the district is the town of Shardara. Population: 78,554 (2013 estimate); 74,997 (2009 census results); 64,324 (1999 census results).
