= Otyrar District =

Coordinates: 42°46′36″N 68°22′09″E

Otyrar Отырар
- District
- Otyrar Audany
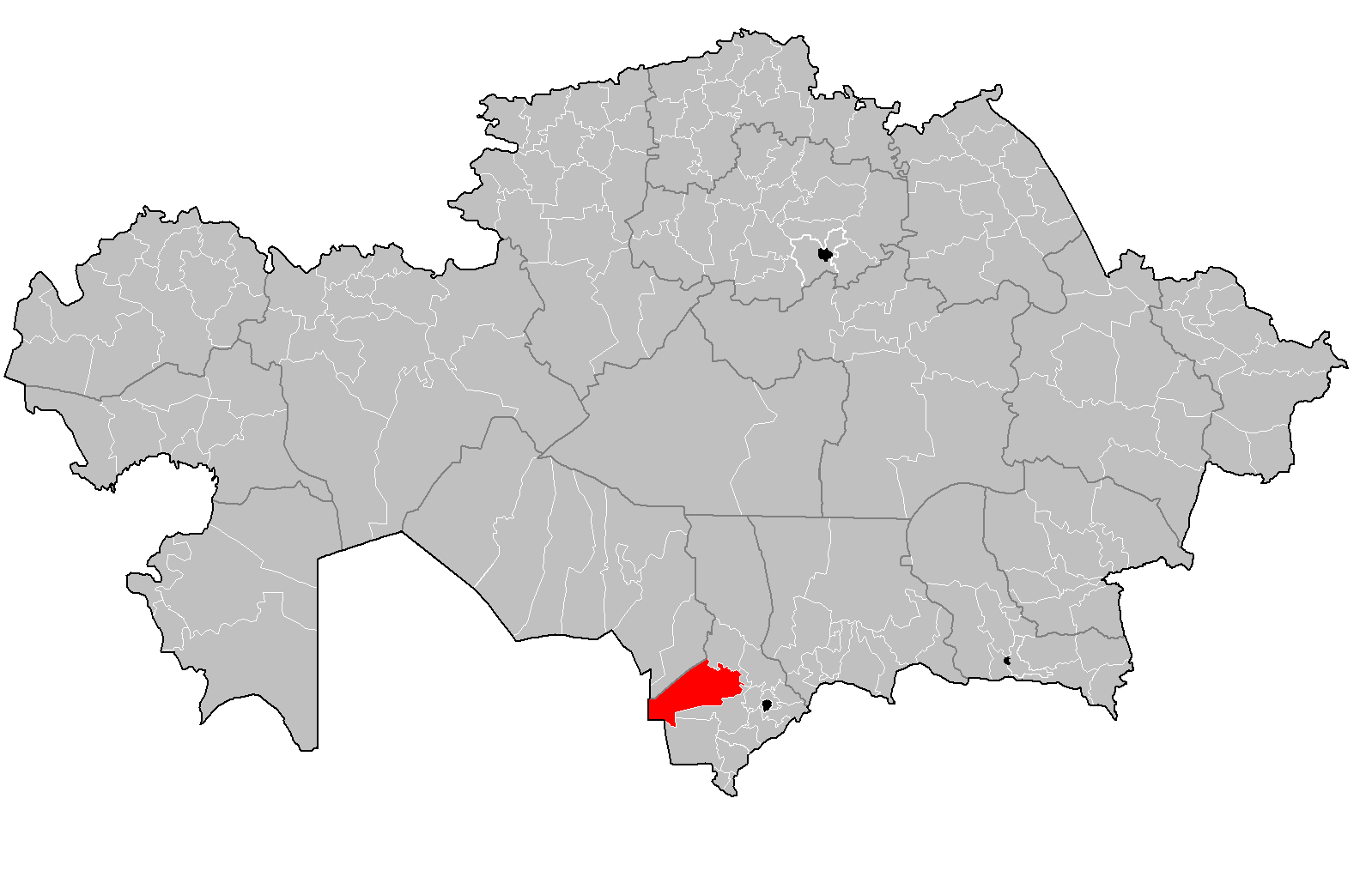
- Country: Kazakhstan
- Region: Turkistan Region
- Administrative center: Shauildir

Government
  - Akim (mayor): Sultankhanov Saken Asylkhanovich

Population (2013)
  - Total: 56,246
- Time zone: UTC+6 (East)

Otyrar (Kazakh: Отырар ауданы, Otyrar audany) is a district of Turkistan Region in southern Kazakhstan. The administrative center of the district is the selo of Shauildir. Population: 56,246 (2013 estimate); 53,131 (2009 census results); 54,017 (1999 census results).
