= Tole Bi District =

Coordinates: 43.6853°N 73.749°E

Tole Bi Төле би
- District
- Töle Bi audany
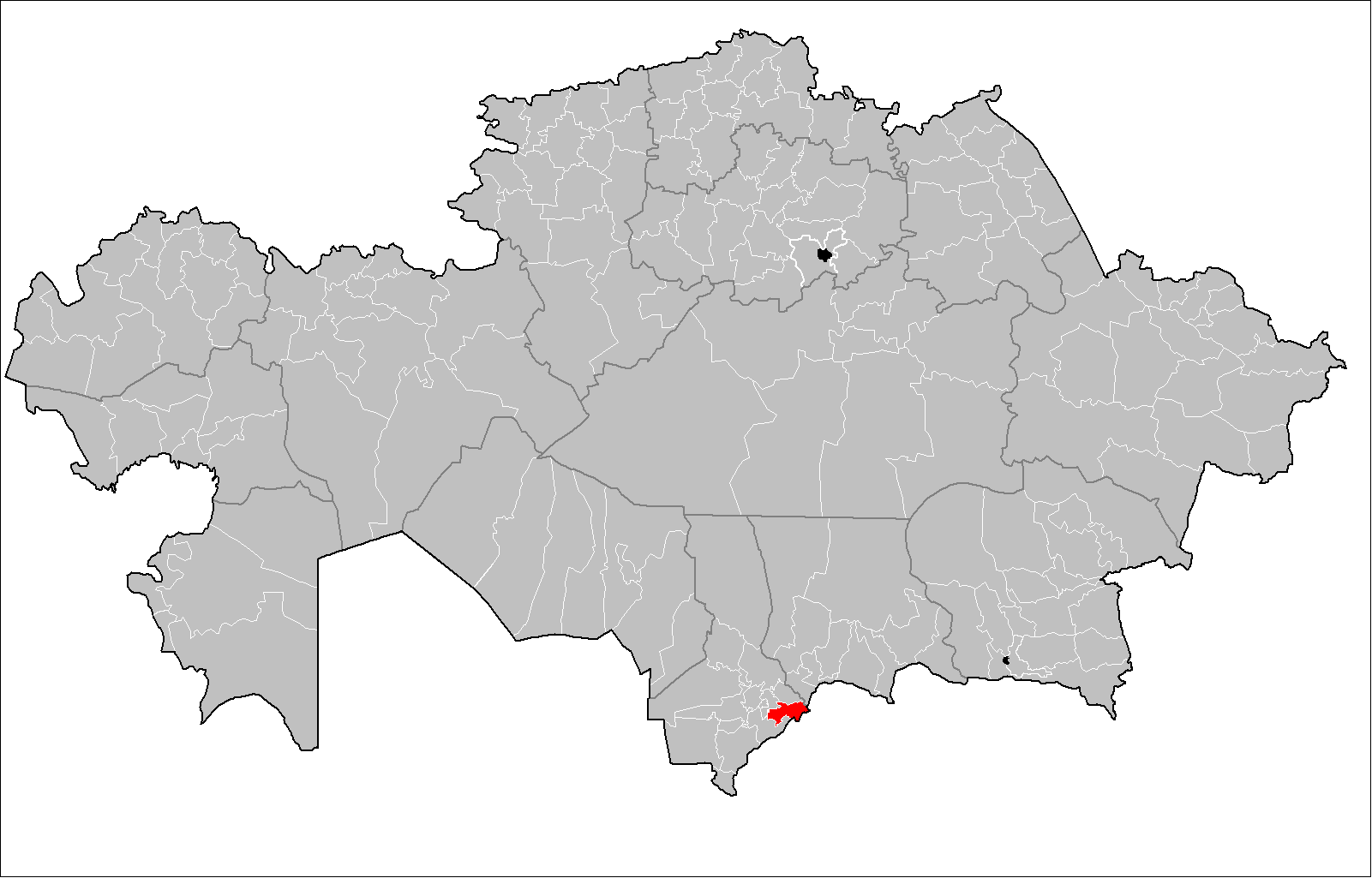
- Country: Kazakhstan
- Region: Turkistan Region
- Administrative center: Lenger

Government
  - Akim: Yerkegali Alimkulov

Population (2013)
  - Total: 132,073
- Time zone: UTC+6 (East)

Tole Bi (Kazakh: Төле би ауданы, Töle Bi audany) is a district of Turkistan Region in southern Kazakhstan. The administrative center of the district is the town of Lenger. Population: 132,073 (2013 estimate); 122,721 (2009 census results); 105,748 (1999 census results). The district is named after Töle Biy, who died there in the 18th century.

== See also ==
- Koksayek village
