= Kazygurt District =

Coordinates: 41.759°N 69.41°E

Kazygurt Қазығұрт
- District
- Qazyğūrt Audany
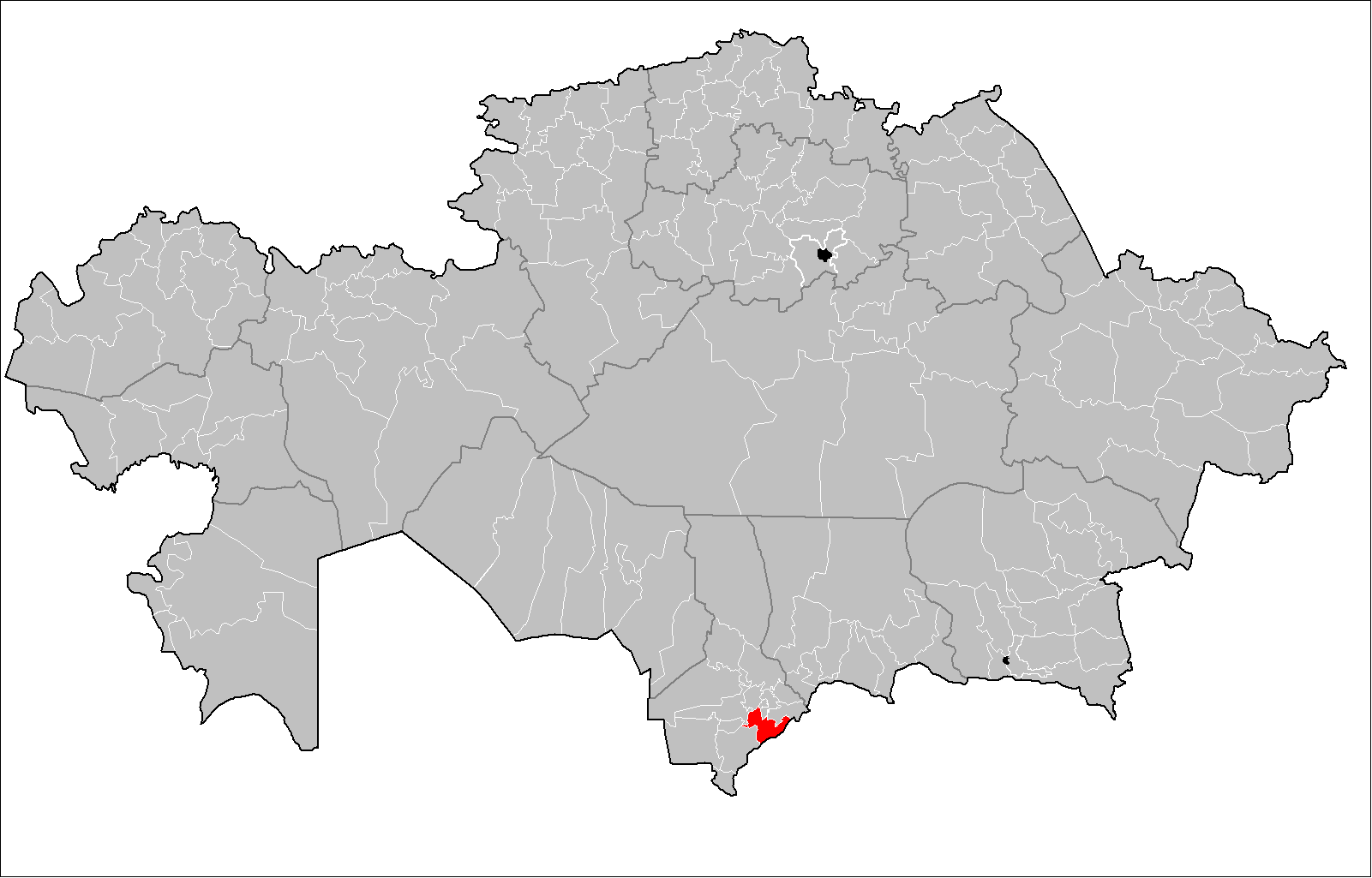
- Country: Kazakhstan
- Region: Turkistan Region
- Administrative center: Kazygurt

Government
  - Akim: Ismailov Azizkhan Azimkhanovich

Population (2013)
  - Total: 106,766
- Time zone: UTC+6 (East)

Kazygurt District (Kazakh: Қазығұрт ауданы, Qazyğūrt audany) is a district of Turkistan Region in southern Kazakhstan. The administrative center of the district is the selo of Kazygurt. Population: 106,766 (2013 estimate); 100,581 (2009 census results); 87,875 (1999 census results).
