= Baydibek District =

Coordinates: 43.035143°N 69.375873°E

Baydibek Бәйдібек
- District
- Бәйдібек ауданы
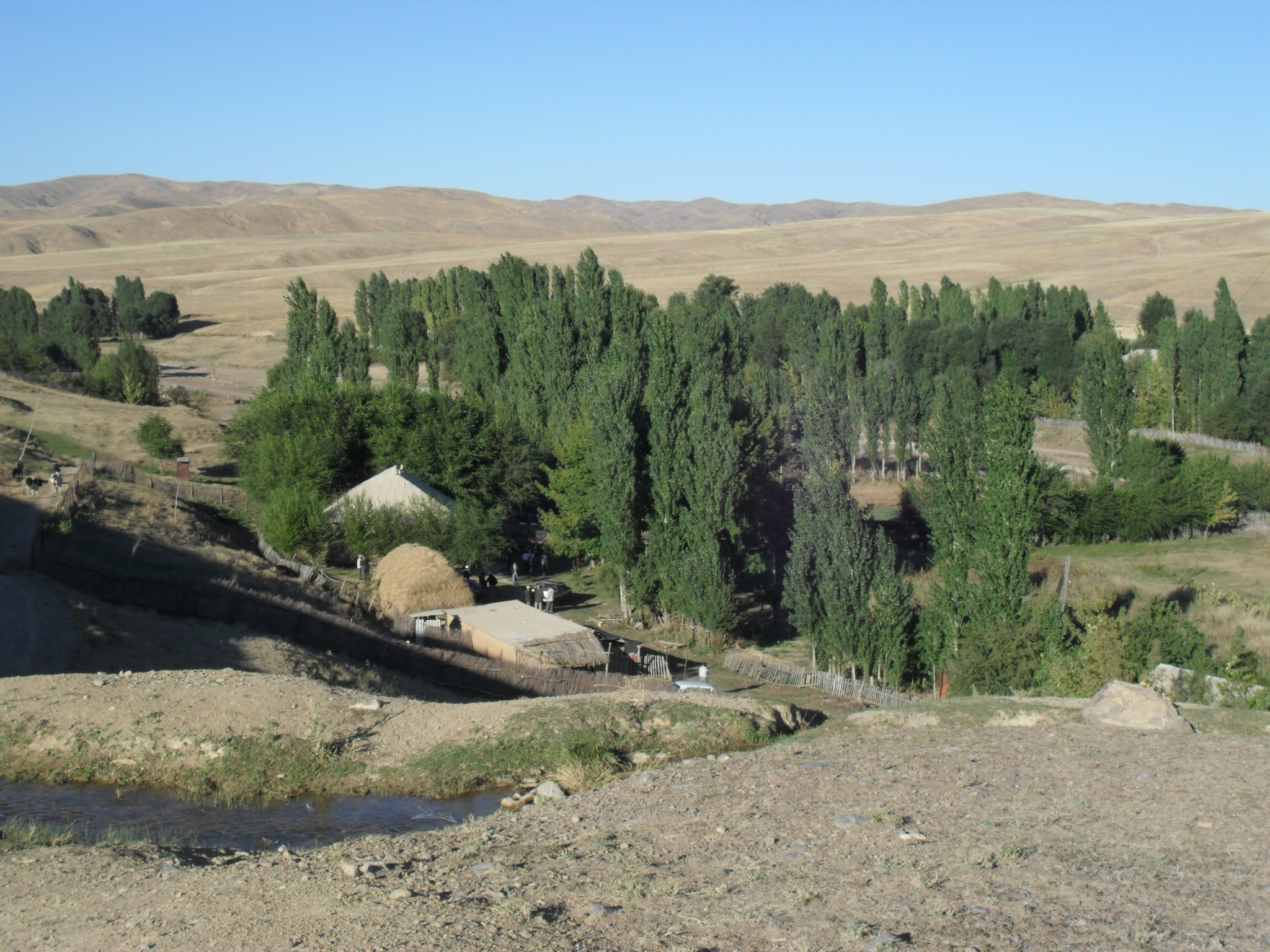
- Aktas village

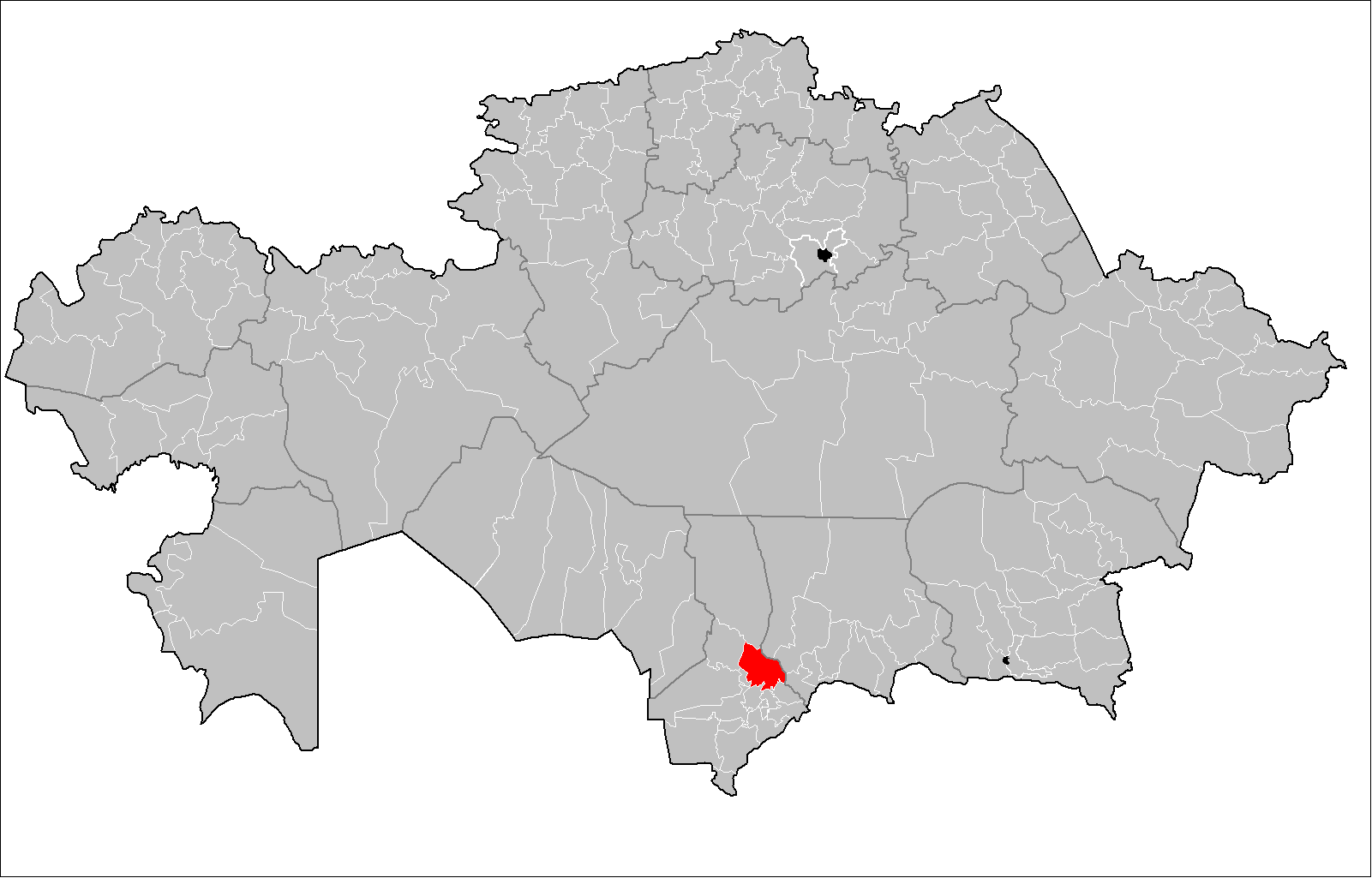
- Country: Kazakhstan
- Region: Turkistan Region
- Administrative center: Shayan

Government
  - Akim: Nurmakhanov Erlan Zaipovich

Population (2013)
  - Total: 54,091
- Time zone: UTC+6 (East)

Baydibek District (Kazakh: Бәйдібек ауданы, Bäidıbek audany; Russian: Байдибекский район) is a district of Turkistan Region in southern Kazakhstan. The administrative center of the district is the selo of Shayan. Population: 54,091 (2013 estimate); 53,004 (2009 census results); 50,508 (1999 census results).
