= Shardara =

Coordinates: 41.2547°N 67.9692°E

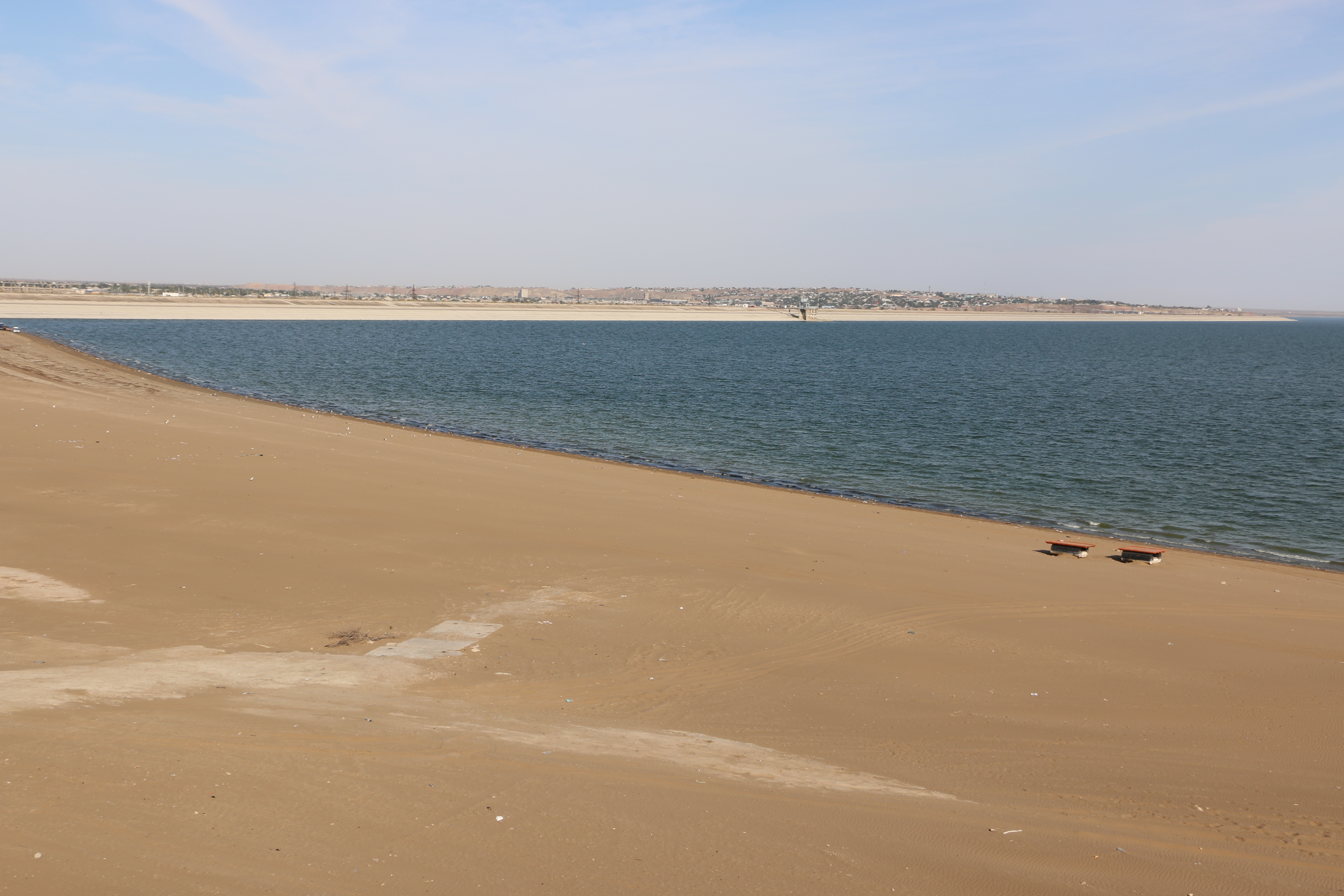
Beach in Shardara

Shardara (Kazakh: Шардара, Şardara) is a town and the administrative center of Shardara District in Turkistan Region of central Kazakhstan. Population: 30,573 (2009 census results); 25,452 (1999 census results).

== Climate ==
Climate data for Shardara (1991–2020 normals, extremes 1973–present)
Month	Jan	Feb	Mar	Apr	May	Jun	Jul	Aug	Sep	Oct	Nov	Dec	Year
Record high °C (°F)	19.8 (67.6)	22.5 (72.5)	28.0 (82.4)	39.0 (102.2)	40.2 (104.4)	43.6 (110.5)	45.7 (114.3)	44.3 (111.7)	40.7 (105.3)	41.0 (105.8)	29.8 (85.6)	19.6 (67.3)	45.7 (114.3)
Mean daily maximum °C (°F)	3.7 (38.7)	6.8 (44.2)	14.4 (57.9)	22.0 (71.6)	28.7 (83.7)	34.4 (93.9)	36.6 (97.9)	35.1 (95.2)	29.3 (84.7)	21.6 (70.9)	12.1 (53.8)	5.0 (41.0)	20.8 (69.4)
Daily mean °C (°F)	−0.2 (31.6)	1.9 (35.4)	8.6 (47.5)	15.6 (60.1)	21.9 (71.4)	27.2 (81.0)	29.2 (84.6)	27.4 (81.3)	21.4 (70.5)	14.3 (57.7)	6.6 (43.9)	1.0 (33.8)	14.6 (58.3)
Mean daily minimum °C (°F)	−3.1 (26.4)	−1.7 (28.9)	4.2 (39.6)	10.5 (50.9)	16.2 (61.2)	20.8 (69.4)	22.5 (72.5)	20.6 (69.1)	14.7 (58.5)	8.5 (47.3)	2.5 (36.5)	−1.9 (28.6)	9.5 (49.1)
Record low °C (°F)	−25.0 (−13.0)	−22.4 (−8.3)	−10.0 (14.0)	−3.6 (25.5)	−0.5 (31.1)	6.0 (42.8)	6.0 (42.8)	5.6 (42.1)	1.0 (33.8)	−7.4 (18.7)	−19.9 (−3.8)	−24.6 (−12.3)	−25.0 (−13.0)
Average precipitation mm (inches)	28.1 (1.11)	36.8 (1.45)	36.3 (1.43)	29.1 (1.15)	20.8 (0.82)	5.5 (0.22)	1.7 (0.07)	1.0 (0.04)	2.2 (0.09)	9.2 (0.36)	28.4 (1.12)	31.0 (1.22)	230.1 (9.06)
Average precipitation days (≥ 1 mm)	6.0	6.1	6.4	5.0	3.5	1.4	0.5	0.4	0.5	2.0	5.0	5.4	42.2
Source 1: NOAA
Source 2: Pogoda i Klimat (extremes)
