= Sayram District =

Coordinates: 52°02′N 76°55′E

Sayram Сайрам ауданы
- District
- Sairam audany
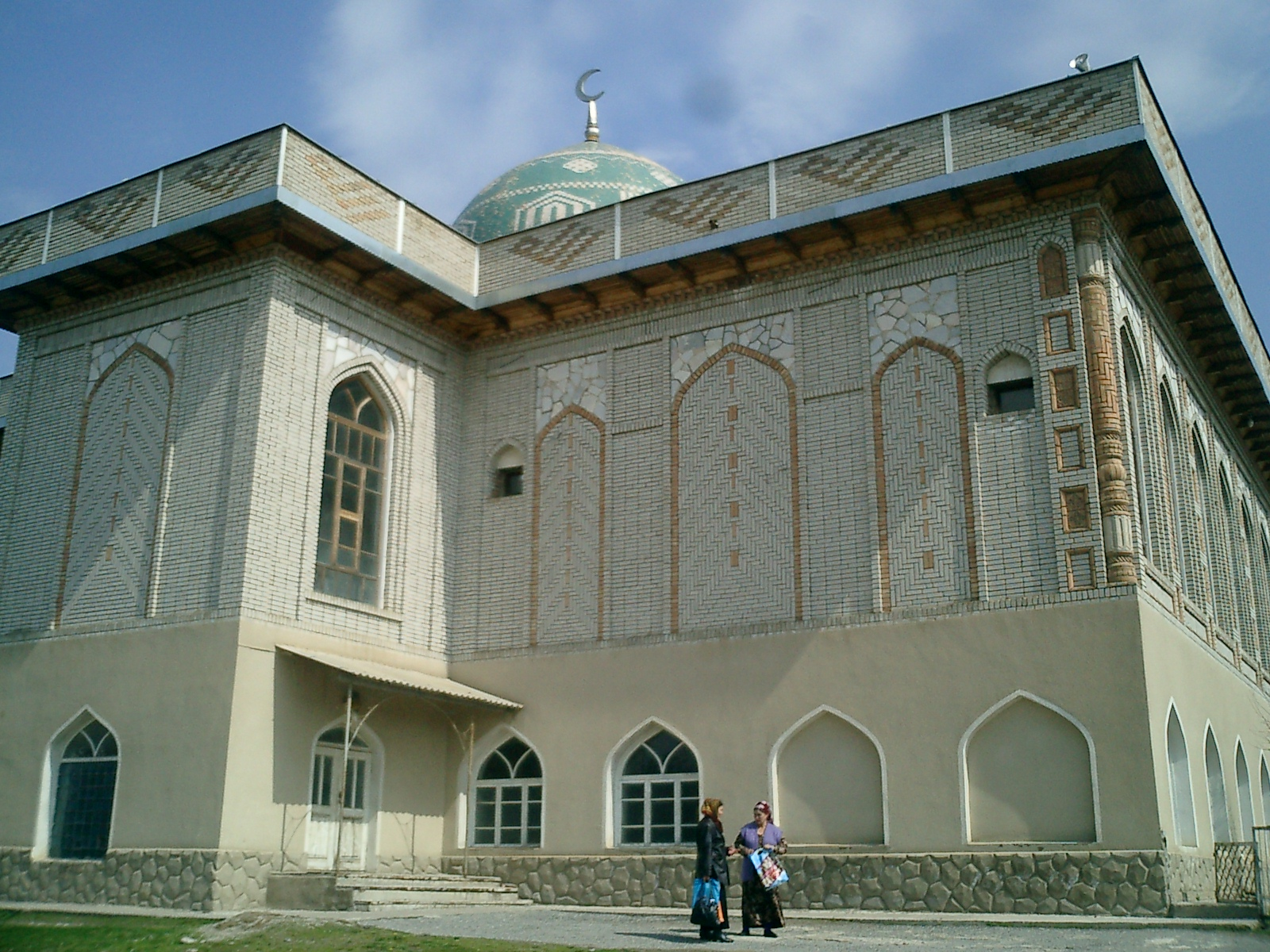
- Sayram mosque

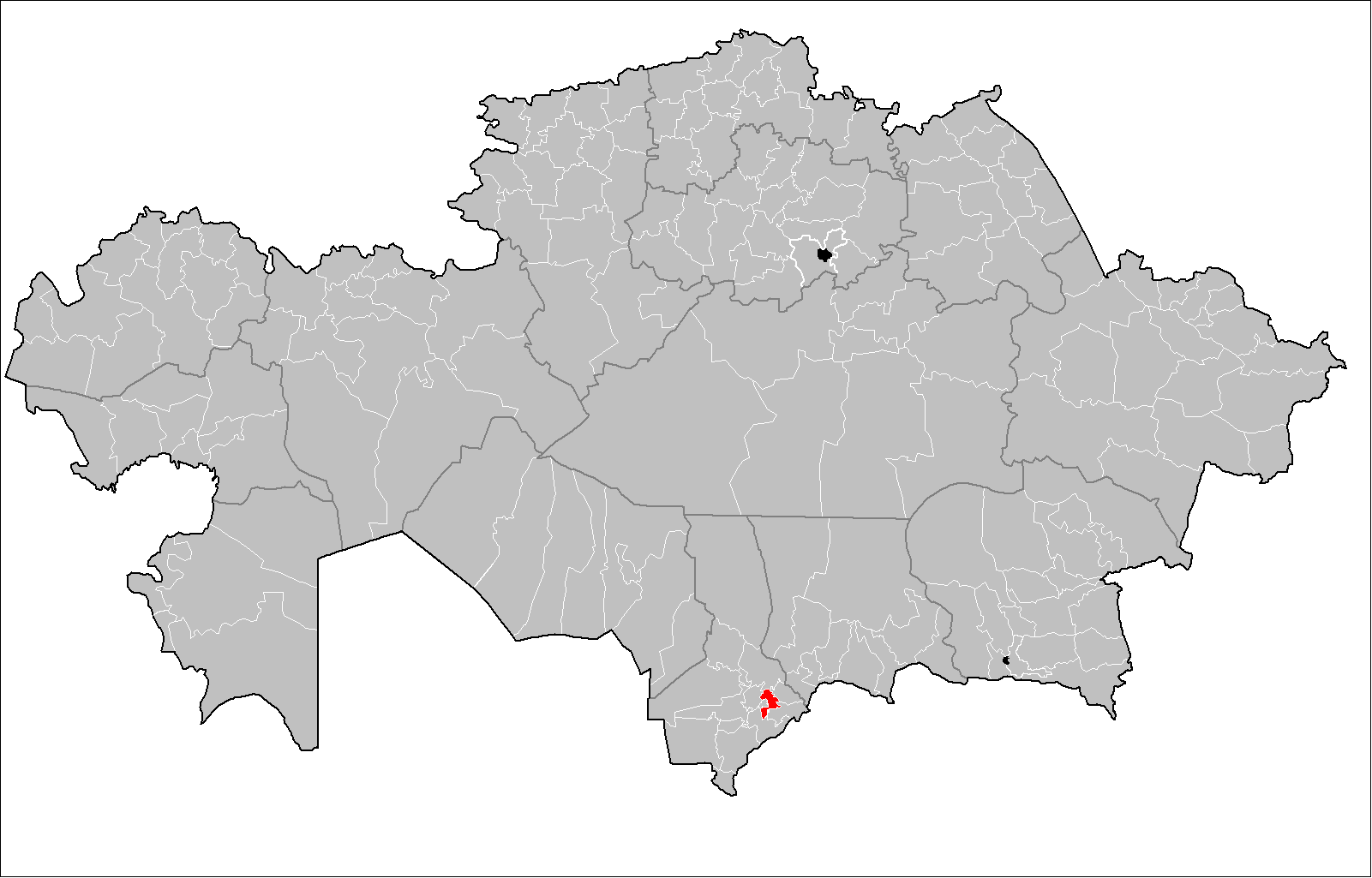
- Country: Kazakhstan
- Region: Turkistan Region
- Administrative center: Aksukent

Government
  - Akim: Arman Sabitov

Population (2013)
  - Total: 311,155
- Time zone: UTC+6 (East)

Sayram (Kazakh: Сайрам ауданы, Sairam audany) is a district of Turkistan Region in southern Kazakhstan. The administrative center of the district is the selo of Aksukent. The historic city of Sayram is located in this district, and gives it its name. Population: 311,155 (2013 estimate); 281,898 (2009 census results); 212,929 (1999 census results).
