= Turkistan Region =

Region in southern Kazakhstan

Turkistan Region Түркістан облысы (Kazakh) Туркестанская область (Russian)
- Region
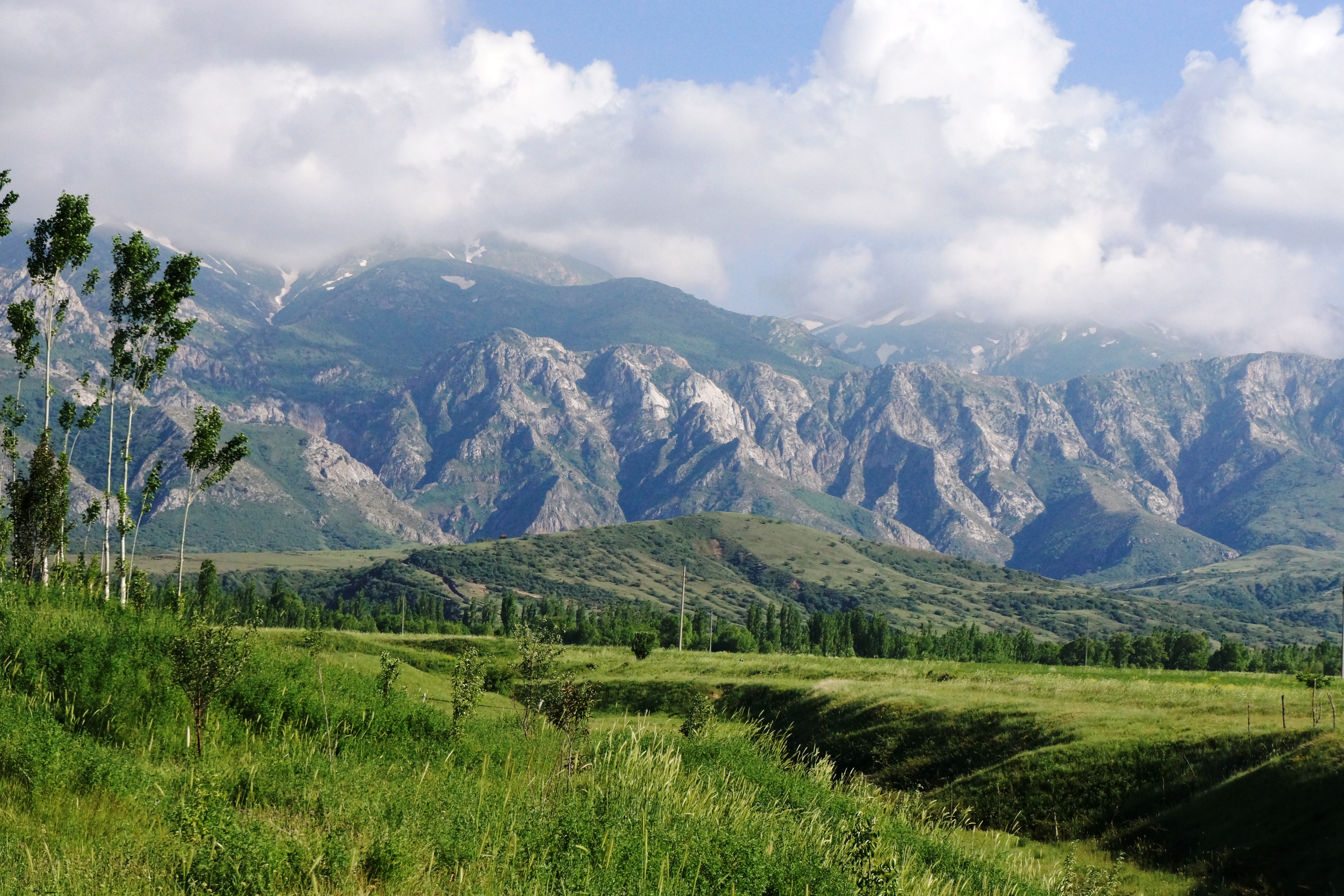
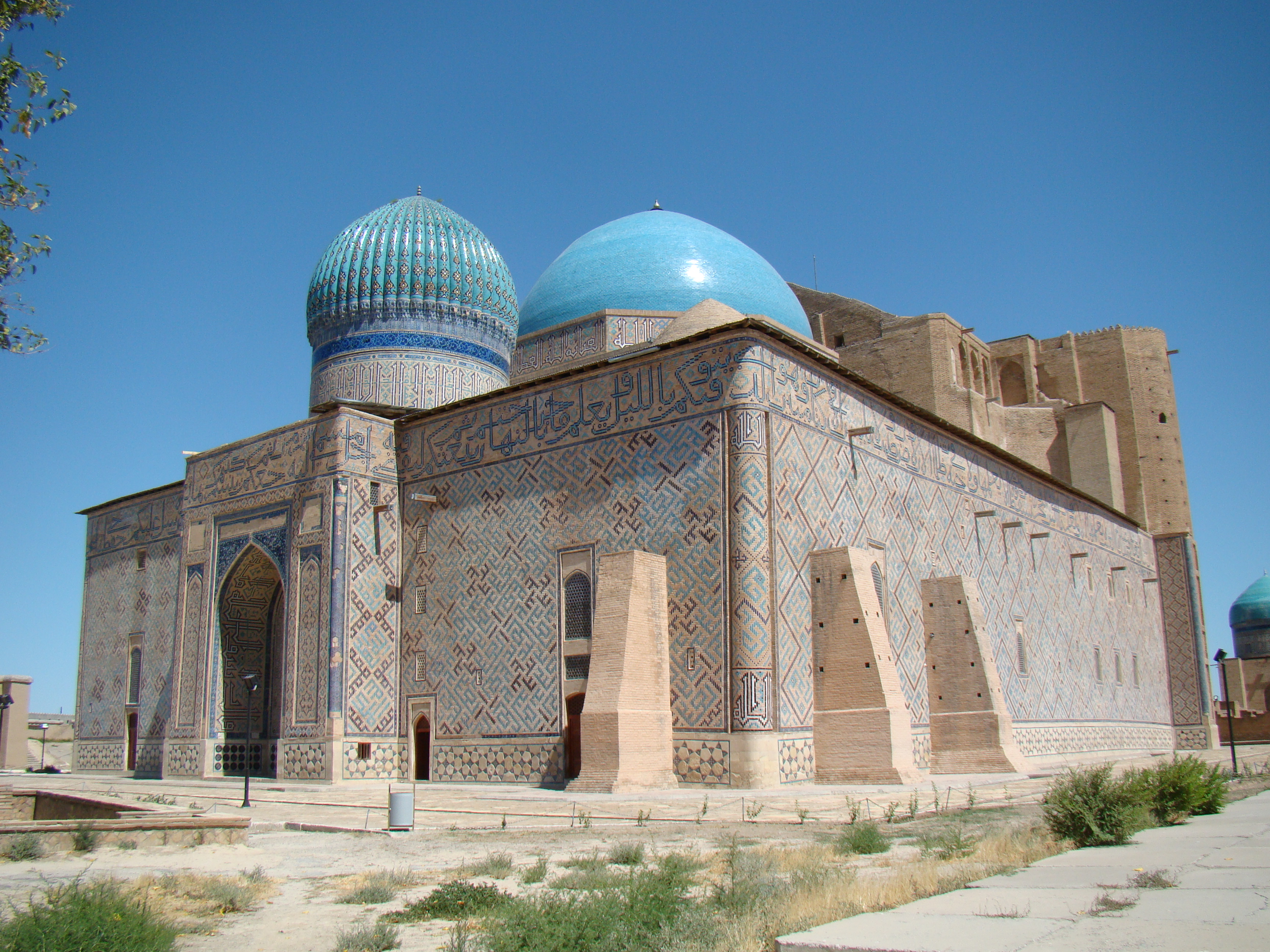
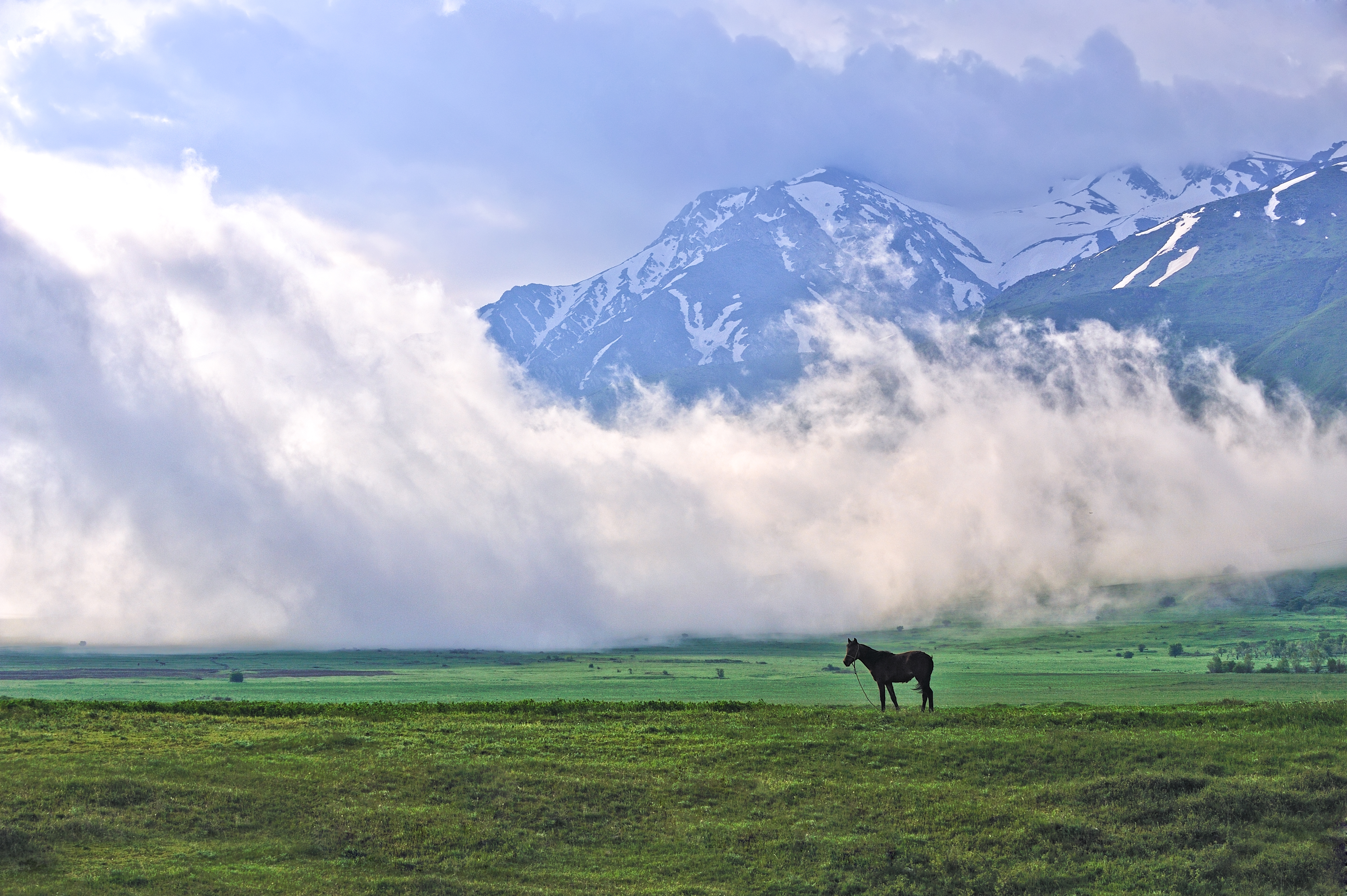
- From the top, Sayram-Ugam National Park, Mausoleum of Khoja Ahmed Yasawi, Aksu-Zhabagly Nature Reserve

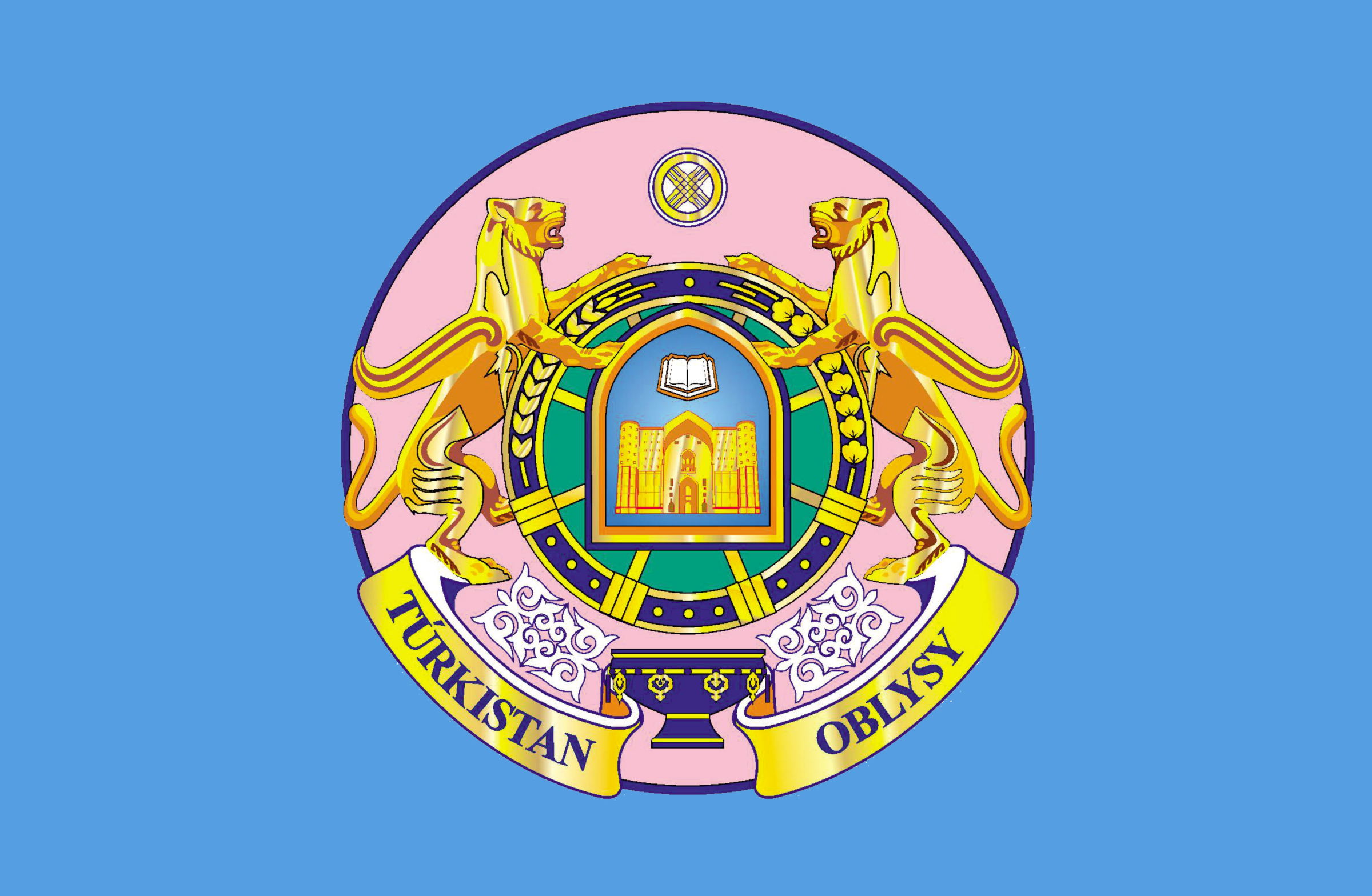
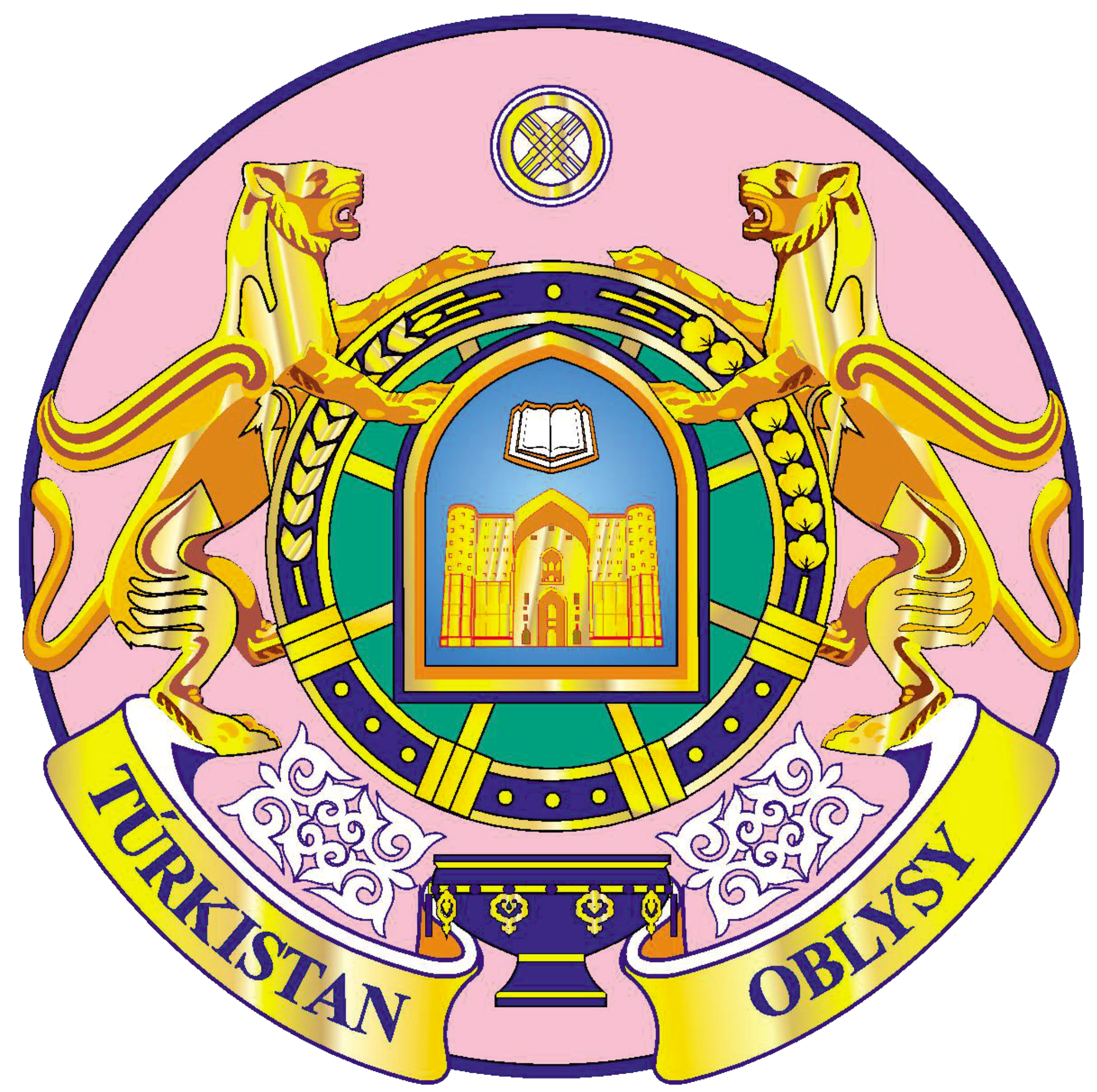
- Flag Coat of arms

- Map of Kazakhstan, location of Turkistan Region highlighted
- Coordinates: 43°00′N 068°30′E
- Country: Kazakhstan
- Capital: Turkistan

Government
  - Akim: Nuralkhan Kusherov

Area
  - Total: 117,249 km^{2} (45,270 sq mi)

Population (2013-02-01)
  - Total: 2,685,009
  - Density: 22.9001/km^{2} (59.3109/sq mi)

GDP (Nominal, 2024)
  - Total: KZT 4,507 billion (US$ 9.465 billion) · 12th
  - Per capita: KZT 2,097,200 (US$ 4,404)
- Time zone: UTC+5
  - Summer (DST): UTC+5 (not observed)
- Postal codes: 160000
- Area codes: +7 (725)
- ISO 3166 code: KZ-YUZ
- Vehicle registration: 13, X
- Districts: 11
- Cities: 8
- Townships: 13
- Villages: 932
- HDI (2022): 0.785 high · 6th
- Website: www.ontustik.gov.kz

Turkistan Region, (Note: Kazakh: Түркістан облысы, romanized: Türkıstan oblysy, pronounced [tʉrkɘ̥sˈtɑn ˌwobɫəˈsə]; Russian: Туркестанская область, romanized: Turkestanskaya oblast) formerly known as South Kazakhstan Region (Note: Kazakh: Оңтүстік Қазақстан облысы, romanized: Oñtüstık Qazaqstan oblysy, pronounced [ˌwoŋtʉ̥sˈtɘk qɑzɑqˈstɑn ˌwobɫəˈsə]; Russian: Южно-Казахстанская область, romanized: Yuzhno-Kazakhstanskaya oblast) from 1992 to 2018 and Chimkent Region (Note: Kazakh: Шымкент облысы, romanized: Şymkent oblysy, pronounced [ʃəmˈkʲent ˌwobɫəˈsə]; Russian: Чимкентская область, romanized: Chimkentskaya oblast) from 1963 to 1991, is the southernmost region of Kazakhstan, bordering Uzbekistan. It had a population of 2,088,510 as of the 2022 Kazakhstan census.

The region's capital is Turkistan, formerly Shymkent until 2018. Other cities in the region include Sayram, Kentau, Arys, Shardara, Zhetisai, Saryagash, and Lenger.

== Geography ==
This region and Atyrau Region are Kazakhstan's two smallest regions; both are about 117,300 square kilometers in area.

Turkistan Region borders the neighboring country of Uzbekistan (and is also very near the Uzbekistan capital Tashkent), as well as three other Kazakhstan regions: Karaganda Region (to the north), Kyzylorda Region (to the west), and Jambyl Region (to the east).

The Syr Darya passes through the region on its way to the Aral Sea. An oil pipeline runs from Turkmenabat, Turkmenistan to Omsk, Russia (where it connects with a larger, Siberian pipeline) through South Kazakhstan. Oil, lead and zinc are refined in Shymkent.

== History ==
The region had a population of 2,088,510 as of 2022; 2,469,367 (2009 census results); 1,978,339 (1999 census results).

The Region was created as South Kazakhstan Oblast in Kazakh SSR of Soviet Union. Between 1962 and 1992 it was named Chimkent Oblast. The administrative center of the Region was Shymkent. On 19 June 2018 Shymkent was taken out of the Region and subordinated directly to the government of Kazakhstan, the administrative center moved to Turkistan, and the Region renamed Turkistan Region.

== Administrative divisions ==
As of 2013, the region was administratively divided into eleven districts and the cities of Shymkent, Arys, Kentau, and Turkistan.

1. Baydibek District, with the administrative center in the selo of Shayan;
2. Kazygurt District, with the selo of Kazygurt;
3. Maktaaral District, with the town of Zhetisay;
4. Ordabasy District, with the selo of Temirlan;
5. Otyrar District, with the selo of Shauldir;
6. Saryagash District, with the town of Saryagash;
7. Sayram District, with the selo of Aksukent;
8. Shardara District, with the town of Shardara;
9. Sozak District, with the selo of Sholakkorgan;
10. Tole Bi District, with the town of Lenger;
11. Tulkibas District, with the selo of Turar Ryskulov.

== Archaeology ==
- Excavations of the Kul-Tobe settlement near the village of Saryaryk on the terrace of the Arys River (42°29′32″N 68°57′45″E) on the territory of the South Kazakhstan region in 2006, made by Kazakh archaeologists led by Doctor of Historical Sciences, Professor A. N. Podushkin, according to some statements, allow to identify the culture of Kangju with the peoples of the Scythian circle. Ceramics (large jugs or persimmons) and weapons (arrowheads, knives, bows and daggers) were found in three graves of nomad warriors who lived about two thousand years ago. 13 epigraphic monuments were found on ceramic bricks-tables — two almost complete texts and eleven fragments. Writing after decryption is defined as alphabetic, lowercase, Aramaic, which also includes ideograms. It marks one of the eastern dialects of the proto-Iranian language. Paleographic and linguistic analysis of the Kultobin script showed that it dates from the II — beginning of the III century AD, that is, more than a century older than the so-called "Old Sogdian letters".
- Excavations of the Tutta Cave, the oldest cave in the country, located in the Turkestan region on the territory of the Syrdarya–Turkestan State Regional Natural Park, it was discovered in the middle of the last century, but excavations began in 2017. The cave is being explored as part of a European Union project, and archaeologists from Germany, Greece, and Spain are involved. Household items of primitive man, who presumably lived during the Stone Age, have been found.
