= Maktaaral District =

Coordinates: 40°46′N 68°19′E

Maktaaral Мақтаарал
- District
- Мaqtaaral Audany
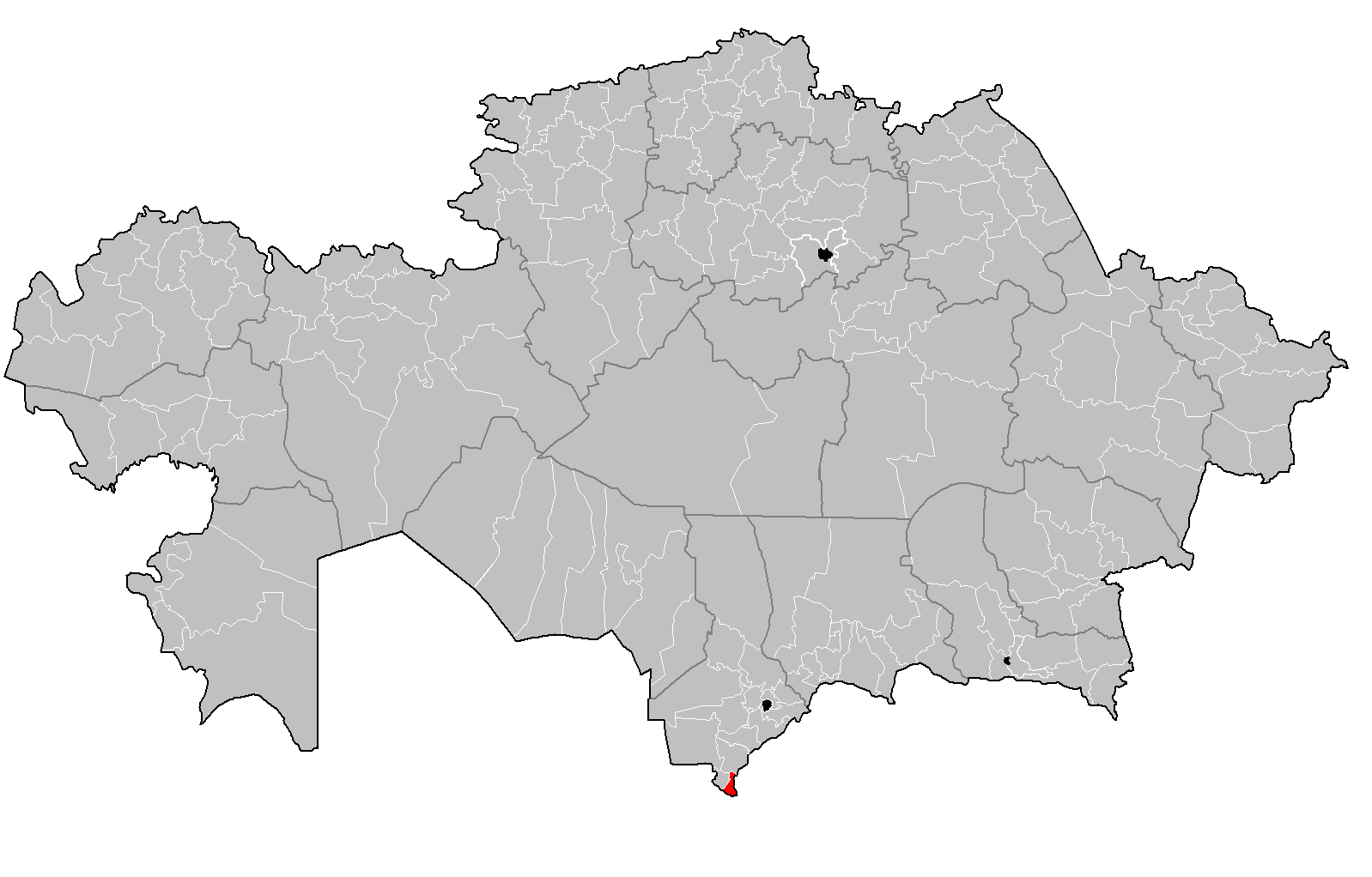
- Country: Kazakhstan
- Region: Turkistan Region
- Administrative center: Myrzakent

Government
  - Akim: Bakhyt Asanov

Population (2013)
  - Total: 296,269
- Time zone: UTC+6 (East)

Maktaaral (Kazakh: Мақтаарал ауданы, Maqtaaral audany) is a district of Turkistan Region in southern Kazakhstan. The administrative center of the district is the town of Myrzakent. Population: 296,269 (2013 estimate); 285,776 (2009 census results); 236,947 (1999 census results).
