= Kayrakty =

Kayrakty Кайракты
- Location within Kazakhstan
- Coordinates: 50°39′58″N 58°29′06″E
- Country: Kazakhstan
- Region: Aktobe
- District: Kargaly District
- Elevation: 343 m (1,125 ft)
- Time zone: UTC+5 (West Kazakhstan Time)
  - Summer (DST): UTC+5 (West Kazakhstan Time)

Map of Aktobe Province

Kayrakty (Kazakh: Қайрақты, Qairaqty), until 2007 Borodinovka, (Russian: Бородиновка, Borodinovka) is an aul (a rural locality) in Kargaly District, Aktobe Region, Kazakhstan. It lies at an altitude of 343 m (1,125 ft). Population: 134 (2009 census results); 563 (1999 census results).
