= Bessarabka =

Bessarabka (Kazakh: Бессарабка; Romanian: Basarabeasca; Russian: Бессарабка; Ukrainian: Бессарабка) is a name for localities used in Kazakhstan, Moldova, Russia and Ukraine. The etymology of places named like this comes from the region of Bessarabia.

== Ukraine ==
- Besarabka (Kyiv), a historical neighbourhood in Kyiv
- Besarabsky Market, an indoor market in Kyiv
- Bessarabska Square, Kyiv

=== Villages ===
- Bessarabka (Novoazovskyi Raion), a village in Novoazovskyi Raion of Donetsk Oblast
- Bessarabka (Berezanskyi Raion), a village in Berezanskyi Raion of Mykolaiv Oblast
- Bessarabka (Velykomykhailivskyi Raion), a village in Velykomykhailivskyi Raion of Odesa Oblast
- Bessarabka (Роменський район), a village in Romenskyi Raion of Sumy Oblast

== Russia ==
- Bessarabka (Petropavlovsky District), a village in Petropavlovsky District, Voronezh Oblast

== Kazakhstan ==
- Saryqobda, a village in Aktobe Region, known as Bessarabka until 1993

== Moldova ==
- Basarabeasca, a city and capital of the Raionul Basarabeasca
- Raionul Basarabeasca, a raion (district) of Moldova
