= Emba =

Emba may refer to:

- Emba, town in Kazakhstan, see Embi
- Emba-5, a Soviet former military installation near Embi, now Zhem, Kazakhstan, a town
- The Emba River, in Kazakhstan
- Emba (village), a village in Cyprus

The acronym EMBA may refer to:

- An Executive Master of Business Administration, see MBA
