= Geology of Kazakhstan =

The geology of Kazakhstan includes extensive basement rocks from the Precambrian and widespread Paleozoic rocks, as well as sediments formed in rift basins during the Mesozoic.

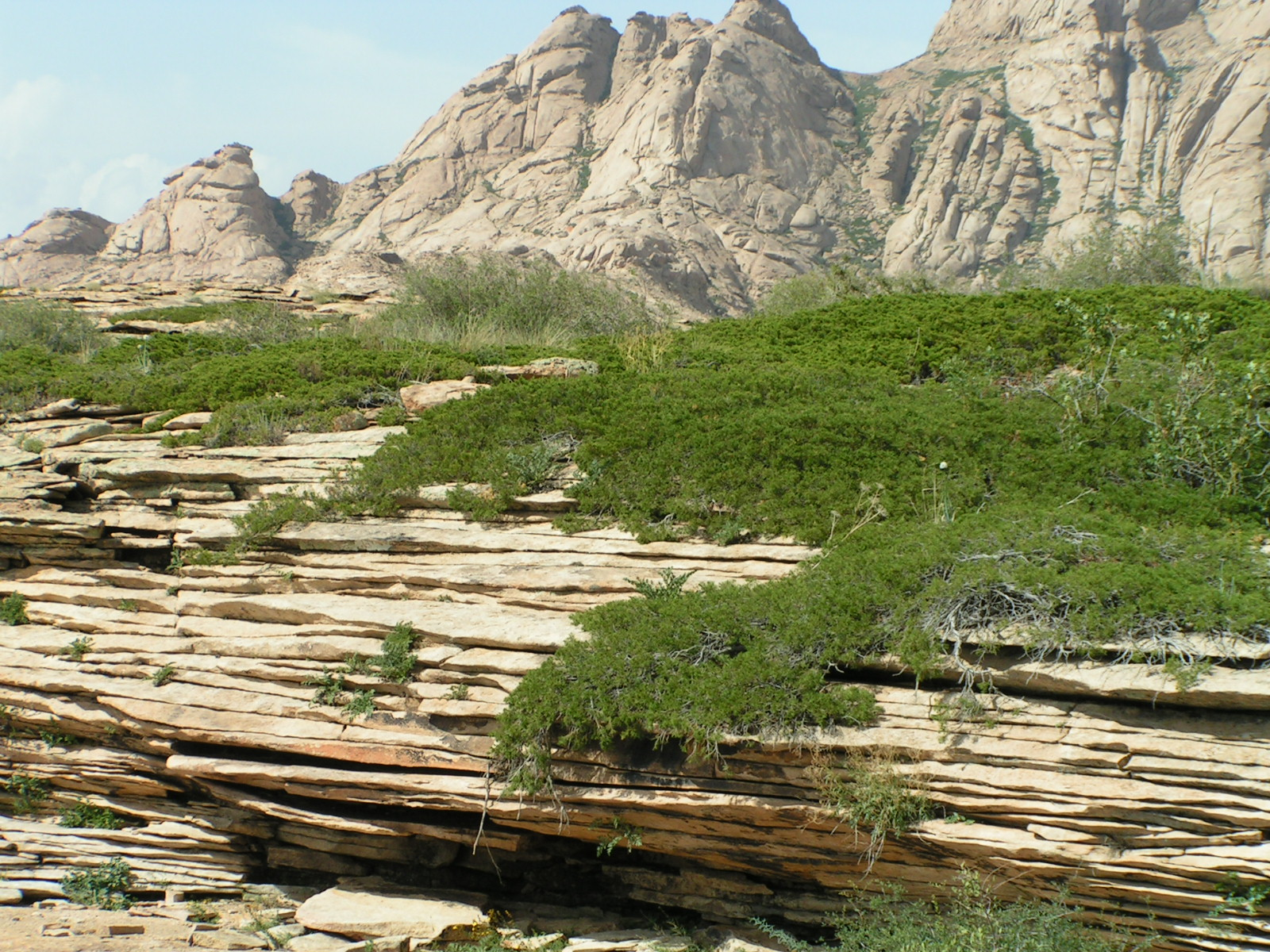
Rock outcrop at Bektau Ata

== Geologic history, stratigraphy and tectonics ==
Archean rocks of the Zerenda Group, including schist, diamond-bearing gneiss, eclogite and marble are found in the Kokchetav Massif in the Kazakh Uplands. However, geologists have disagreed on dating with some indicating dates in the Middle Cambrian or Archean through Paleoproterozoic. Early Proterozoic rocks are better defined and include phyllite, schist, quartzite, porphyroids, porphyritoids, marble and jaspellite, intruded by 1.8 billion year old granite gneiss and 1.7 billion year old granosyenite. The Paleoproterozoic sequence is 14 kilometers thick. In the Jeltau Mountains, the basement is made up gneiss, schist, marble, amphibolite and eclogite. Migmatized gneiss, amphibolite and quartzite are found in the Mugodzhar area. Precambrian rocks are not found in the Kazakh Altai Mountains, although they are present where the range extends into Russia and China.

Much of Eastern Europe and Central Asia has Riphean rocks from the Proterozoic. Terrigenous volcanic rocks which may have originated from rifting are located in the South Urals, metamorphosed to greenschist grade, with amphibolites in linear folds. Dolomite limestones with stromatalite fossils and quartzites are found in the Kazakh Uplands. Low-grade metamorphism and granitization took place from 1.2 billion to one billion years ago. All the Precambrian massifs hold Upper Riphean quartzite and quartz sandstone, dated with detritral zircon to 850 million years ago.

Riphean and Vendian deposits occupy the western and southwest parts of the Kazakh Uplands. In Ulutau, alkaline granitoids intruded volcanic rocks 650 million years ago. Lower Vendian rocks are up to 1.5 kilometers thick, including gray clastic rocks, acid tuff and alkali basalt flows.

=== Paleozoic ===
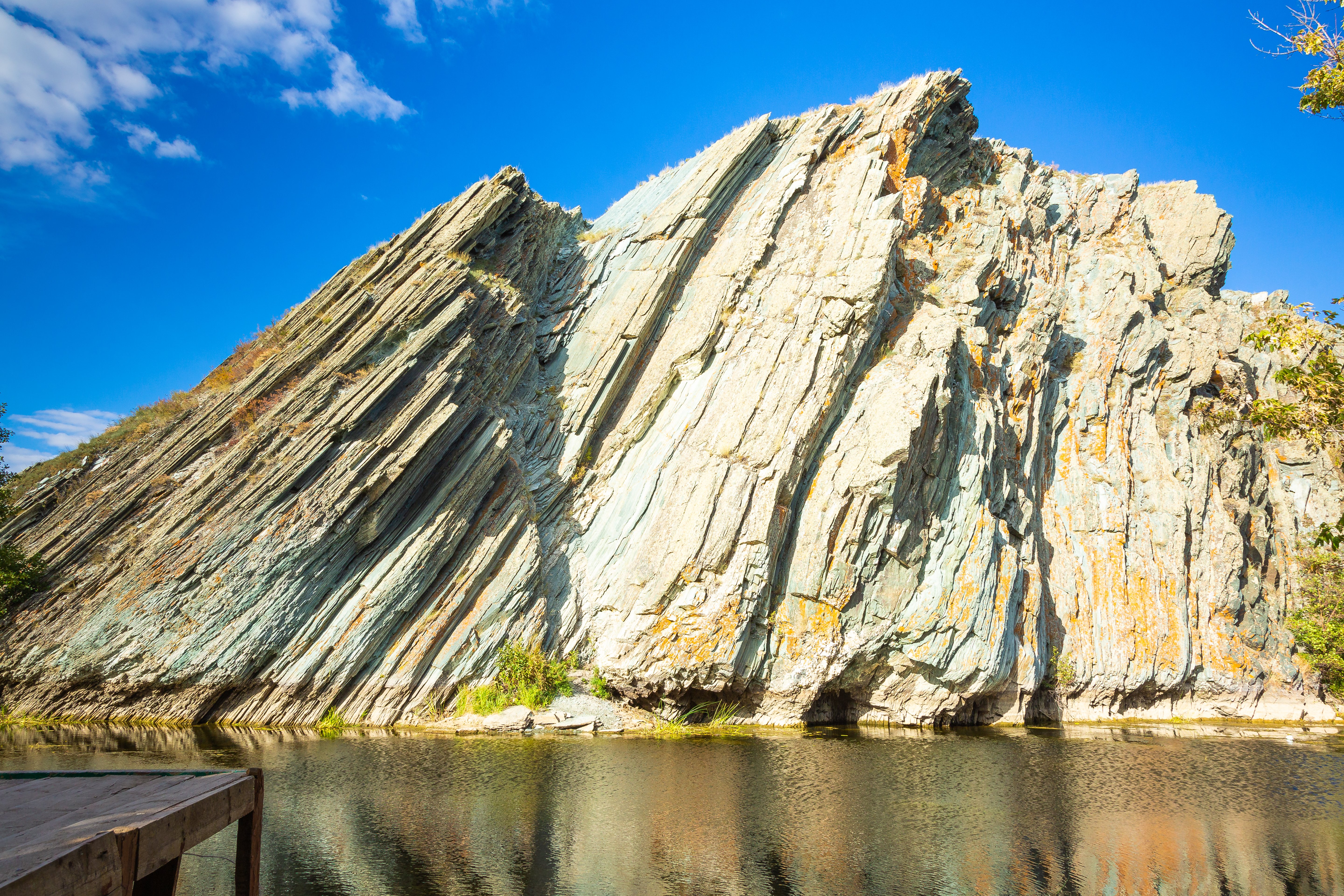
Rock outcrop by the Ebita river, Aktobe Region, western Kazakhstan

Cambrian through Ordovician rocks from the Paleozoic are found in all Kazakhstan's orogenic belts. A thin sequence, 200 to 400 meters thick overlies Vendian rocks in the Kazakh Upland, including coal shale, deepwater chert, limestone, phosphate and barite deposits. The Early Ordovician gives way to 200 meters of shale and chert, followed by flysch up to 3.5 kilometers thick and another thick sequence of andesite, basalt and coarse clastics. Silurian rocks are absent in the uplands.

In Chu-Kungey, Tengiz, Zharma-Saur and other districts, island arc volcanic rocks such as tuff, clastics and reef limestone are up to seven kilometers thick.

In the North Caspian Depression, only Late Paleozoic rocks outcrop at the surface. Deepwater chert and carbonates are common, with deposits up to 25 kilometers thick. Permian up to five kilometers thick has formed domes, which intrude upward into Mesozoic and Paleogene rocks. Carboniferous deepwater limestone forms a four kilometer flysch in the Cis-Urals Foredeep Basin in the South Urals region, which also includes olistrosomes and a Permian salt-bearing marine molasse.

Middle Cambrian rocks in the Kazakh Uplands have an angular unconformity with older rocks because they were thrust onto a magmatic arc in the Devonian to the northwest of the Karaganda Foredeep Basin. Within the foredeep basin, limestone deposition shifted to coal-bearing molasse.

Small synclines in the Karaganda Foredeep Basin show deepwater limestone and shale 450 meters thick from the Carboniferous and Permian, as well as 4.5 kilometer thick coal-bearing molasse. Within the Tengiz Basin, deposits are never more than two kilometers thick and grow thicker to the south. The Chu Basin is filled with undeformed Middle Devonian through Permian red molasse and carbonate deposits. Calc-alkaline magmatism was extensive in the southeast Kazakh Uplands and the Tien Shan Mountains. Geologists have recognized these rocks through magnetic anomalies, drillholes and occasional outcrops. The volcanic rocks include tuff, cooled lava and trachyandesite and rhyolite ignimbrite up to five kilometers thick.

=== Mesozoic-Cenozoic (251 million years ago-present) ===
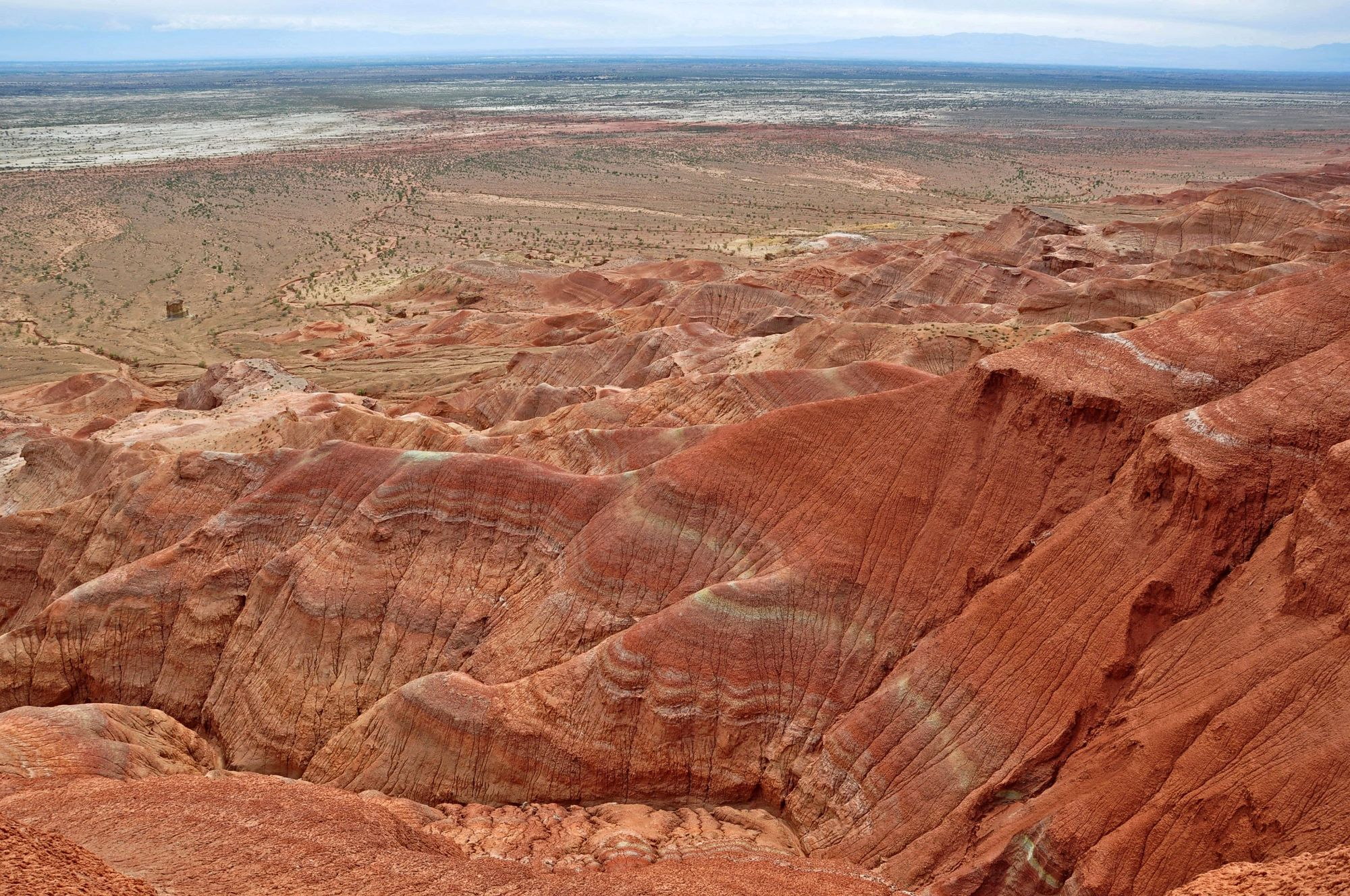
Layers of Paleogene rock in eastern Kazakhstan

Intraplate rifting began in the Triassic, forming massive sedimentary basins between Paleozoic uplands. The North Caspian Depression filled with terrigenous rocks and shallow water carbonates at the edge of the Tethys Ocean, similar to the West Siberian Basin which becomes thicker near the center. The Chu, Turgay, Turan and Kizilkum basins contain sand, clay and coal-bearing shallow water terrigenous sediments and salt deposits two kilometers thick from the Middle Jurassic, up to three kilometers thick from the Cretaceous and one kilometer thick from the Cenozoic.

The Triassic was a period of erosion in the Kazakh Uplands and the Zaysan, Alakol, Balkhash and Tengiz basins are all small and filled with Late Triassic through Jurassic lacustrine deposits. Cretaceous and Paleogene deposits are largely missing, followed by a 100-meter thick sequence of Neogene and Quaternary gypsum-bearing alluvial fan sediments.

== Geological research ==
Geological research in Kazakhstan began in the 18th century due to growing Russian influence along the Ob River, Orenburg to Mugodzar and Petropavlovsk to the Kazakh Steppe. The Russian Academy of Sciences sent some early expeditions, such as Pallas' Asian Expedition in 1771. In the 1800s Russian mining groups explored the Kirgiz Steppe north of the Tien Shan mountains and the construction of the Trans-Siberian Railway prompted further study. The Russian Geological Committee launched regional mapping efforts in 1925, after foreign sources on Central Asian geology disappeared in the aftermath of the Russian Revolution. As recently as the early 1990s, geologists in Kazakhstan were split between plate tectonics and a different set of mobilist theories more similar to the old geosynclinal model.

== Natural resource geology ==
The North Caspian Depression contains oil and natural gas, together with the Chu Basin, where they are associated with salt diapirs, typically in Cretaceous, Paleogene, Jurassic and Triassic sandstone and clay strata. Kazakhstan has rich coal deposits with 300 major deposits and 170.2 billion tons of reserves. Coking coal is primarily extracted from the Karaganda Basin. The Turgay, Balkhash and Maikuben depressions all hold small deposits of Mesozoic coal. The country has about eight billion tons of iron, nickel, cobalt and up to 300 tungsten deposits. Other base metals include aluminum from bauxite in the Turgay Depression and Mugodzhar Mountains, vanadium, titanium-bearing pegmatite or ilmenite-zircon placers, chromium in ophiolites in the South Urals, gold in shale and magmatic arcs, as well as rare earths, lead, zinc, copper and molybdenum.

== See also ==
- Charyn National Park – National park in Kazakhstan
