= Bel'kopa =

Bel'kopa Белқопа Белкопа بەلقوپا
- Location within Kazakhstan
- Coordinates: 50°04′19″N 59°35′08″E
- Country: Kazakhstan
- Region: Aktobe
- Elevation: 307 m (1,007 ft)
- Time zone: UTC+5 (West Kazakhstan Time)
  - Summer (DST): UTC+5 (West Kazakhstan Time)

Bel'kopa, also known as Belkopa, (Kazakh: Белқопа, Belqopa, بەلقوپا; Russian: Белкопа, Belkopa) is a town in Aktobe Region, west Kazakhstan. It lies at an altitude of 307 m (1,007 ft).
