= Romanians in Kazakhstan =

Ethnic Romanian minority in Kazakhstan

Romanian: Românii din Kazahstan Kazakh: Қазақстан румындары

Total population
- 594 (additional 19,460 Moldovans); 40,000 to 50,000 (estimate)

Languages
- Romanian (native), also Kazakh and Russian

Religion
- Predominantly Eastern Orthodox Christianity

Related ethnic groups
- Romanians (including Moldovans)

The Romanians in Kazakhstan (Romanian: români; Kazakh: Румындар, romanized: Rwmındar) are an ethnic Romanian minority in Kazakhstan. In the 1999 Kazakh census, 594 Romanians and 19,460 Moldovans, which Romanian media has claimed as also being part of the Romanian minority of the country, were registered in Kazakhstan. However, they are estimated to be around 40,000 or even 50,000 people.

== History ==
Most of the Romanians in Kazakhstan come from the regions of Bessarabia, the Hertsa region and Northern Bukovina, all of which used to be part of Romania. They live scattered mostly in the north of the country, although some Romanians also live in the south, including in the former Kazakh capital of Almaty and its surroundings. The Romanians of Kazakhstan have received sporadic visits from the Romanian ambassador to Kazakhstan.

The Romanian minority of Kazakhstan arrived to this country through several migration waves. The first was during the period of rule of the Russian Empire over Bessarabia. Some Romanians migrated to modern Kazakhstan after being promised lands by the Russian authorities, with some posteriorly returning while others staying. The second wave occurred as a result of the Soviet deportations from Bessarabia and Northern Bukovina, after which many Romanians were taken to Kazakhstan but also to other places like Siberia.

According to Romanian media, most of the Romanians of the country are distinctly considered Moldovans by the Kazakh authorities. This is allegedly not because they self-identify as such, but because, in Kazakhstan, the ethnicity of a person is determined by that of their father, with many people being recorded as Moldovans as a result of the times of Soviet rule over Kazakhstan. Only a small number of Romanians are officially considered as such in the country, mostly because they are descended from Romanian prisoners of war in the Soviet Union.

== Religion and culture ==
In Kazakhstan there are no Romanian Orthodox churches, so Romanians attend Russian Orthodox churches like other non-Russian Orthodox minorities in the country. Two Romanian villages in the Aktobe Region have survived in Kazakhstan, Bessarabka (now known as Saryqobda) and Moldavanka.

The Kazakh Romanians have a cultural organization of their own, the Dacia Association of Kazakhstan, led by Nicolae Plushkis. In 2010, Traian Băsescu, the President of Romania at the time, promulgated a law granting Romanians who had lost their Romanian citizenship "abusively", including the Kazakh Romanians, the right to reobtain it. Since then, some Kazakh Romanians have migrated to Romania.

== Notable people ==
- Alexandru Arseni (born 1952), Moldovan politician
- Simion Plămădeală (1935–2016), Romanian-language writer from Karaganda

== See also ==
- Kazakhstan–Romania relations
- Romanian diaspora
  - Moldovan diaspora
- Romanians in Kyrgyzstan
- Romanians in Uzbekistan
