= Aqqaytym =

Aqqaytym Аққайтым Аккайтым اققايتىم
- Location within Kazakhstan
- Coordinates: 47°28′50″N 59°18′03″E
- Country: Kazakhstan
- Region: Aktobe
- Elevation: 171 m (561 ft)
- Time zone: UTC+5 (West Kazakhstan Time)
  - Summer (DST): UTC+5 (West Kazakhstan Time)

Aqqaytym, also known as Akkaytym and Muzdykuduk, (Kazakh: Аққайтым, Aqqaitym, اققايتىم; Russian: Аккайтым, Akkaytym) is a town in Aktobe Region, west Kazakhstan. It lies at an altitude of 171 m (561 ft).
