= Kotrtas =

Kotrtas Qotyrtas
- Village
- Location in Kazakhstan
- Coordinates: 48°21′0″N 58°49′0″E
- Country: Kazakhstan
- Region: Aktobe Region
- Time zone: UTC+5 (Central Asia Time)

Kotrtas (Kazakh: Қотыртас, Qotyrtas) is a village in the Aktobe Region of western Kazakhstan.
