= Bogetsay =

Bogetsay Бөгетсай Богетсай بوگەتساي
- Location within Kazakhstan
- Coordinates: 50°07′20″N 59°05′44″E
- Country: Kazakhstan
- Region: Aktobe
- Elevation: 270 m (890 ft)
- Time zone: UTC+5 (West Kazakhstan Time)
  - Summer (DST): UTC+5 (West Kazakhstan Time)

Bogetsay (Kazakh: Бөгетсай, Bögetsai, بوگەتساي; Russian: Богетсай, Bogetsay) is a town in Aktobe Region, west Kazakhstan. It lies at an altitude of 270 m (890 ft).
