= Baturasay =

Baturasay Байтурасай Байтурасай بايتۋراساي
- Location within Kazakhstan
- Coordinates: 50°57′39″N 56°46′56″E
- Country: Kazakhstan
- Region: Aktobe
- Elevation: 220 m (720 ft)
- Time zone: UTC+5 (West Kazakhstan Time)
  - Summer (DST): UTC+5 (West Kazakhstan Time)

Baturasay, also known as Bayturasay, (Kazakh: Байтурасай, Baiturasai, بايتۋراساي; Russian: Байтурасай, Bayturasay) is a town in Aktobe Region, west Kazakhstan. It has an altitude of 220 m (720 ft).
