= 13 let Kasakhstan =

- village
- Location within Kazakhstan
- Coordinates: 50°33′0″N 55°59′11″E
- Country: Kazakhstan
- Region: Aktobe Region
- District: Martuk District

Population (2009)
  - Total: 123
- Time zone: UTC+7

13 let Kasakhstan (Kazakh: Қазақстанға 13 жыл, Russian: 13 лет Казахстана) is a village located in the Martuk District of Aktobe Region in northwestern Kazakhstan. Population: 123 (2009 census results).
