= Kokzhide =

Kokzhide or Kokjide (Kazakh: Көкжиде) is the name of the following locations in Kazakhstan:

- Kokzhide, Almaty Region
- Kokzhide, Zhetisu Region
- Kokzhide, TurkistanRegion
- Kokzhide Sands, sandy valley in Mugalzhar District
