= Akkemer =

Akkemer Ақкемер اقكەمەر
- Location within Kazakhstan
- Coordinates: 49°39′26″N 57°20′22″E
- Country: Kazakhstan
- Region: Aktobe
- Elevation: 268 m (879 ft)
- Time zone: UTC+5 (West Kazakhstan Time)
  - Summer (DST): UTC+5 (West Kazakhstan Time)

Akkemer (also known as Aqkemer (Kazakh: Ақкемер, Aqkemer, اقكەمەر)) is a town in Aktobe Region, west Kazakhstan. It lies at an altitude of 268 m (879 ft).
