= Araltogay =

Araltogay Аралтоғай Аралтогай ارالتوعاي
- Town
- Location within Kazakhstan
- Coordinates: 49°49′48″N 60°05′55″E
- Country: Kazakhstan
- Region: Aktobe

Government
  - Akim: Ermaganbetov Darkhan Zhanyskhanovich
- Elevation: 210 m (690 ft)
- Time zone: UTC+05:00 (Kazakhstan Time)

Araltogay, also known as Araltoghay and Araltugay, (Kazakh: Аралтоғай, Araltoğai, ارالتوعاي; Russian: Аралтогай, Araltogay) is a town in Aktobe Region, west Kazakhstan. It lies at an altitude of 210 m (690 ft).
