= Staraya Masra =

- Village
- Location in Kazakhstan
- Coordinates: 50°07′00″N 56°05′00″E
- Country: Kazakhstan
- Region: Aktobe Region
- Time zone: UTC+5 (Central Asia Time)

Staraya Masra (Старая Масра in Russian) is a village in the Aktobe Region of western Kazakhstan, located at 50°07'N 56°5'E.
