= Bogoslovka, Kazakhstan =

Bogoslovka Богословка
- Location within Kazakhstan
- Coordinates: 50°06′03″N 56°49′26″E
- Country: Kazakhstan
- Region: Aktobe
- Elevation: 336 m (1,102 ft)
- Time zone: UTC+5 (West Kazakhstan Time)
  - Summer (DST): UTC+5 (West Kazakhstan Time)

Bogoslovka, also known as Bogoslavskoye, (Russian: Богословка, Bogoslovka) is a town in Aktobe Region, west Kazakhstan. It lies at an altitude of 336 m (1,102 ft).
