= Ushkatty =

Ushkatty is a village in Aktobe Region, in the western part of Kazakhstan.
