= Begaly =

Begaly Бегәлі Бегалы بەگالى
- Location within Kazakhstan
- Coordinates: 50°57′39″N 56°46′56″E
- Country: Kazakhstan
- Region: Aktobe
- Elevation: 177 m (581 ft)
- Time zone: UTC+5 (West Kazakhstan Time)
  - Summer (DST): UTC+5 (West Kazakhstan Time)

Begaly (Kazakh: Бегәлі, Begälı, بەگالى; Russian: Бегалы, Begaly) is a town in Aktobe Region, west Kazakhstan. It lies at an altitude of 177 m (581 ft).
