= Andreyevka, Kazakhstan =

Andreyevka Андреевка Қызылжар
- Location within Kazakhstan
- Coordinates: 50°54′03″N 57°06′05″E
- Country: Kazakhstan
- Region: Aktobe
- Elevation: 318 m (1,043 ft)
- Time zone: UTC+5 (West Kazakhstan Time)
  - Summer (DST): UTC+5 (West Kazakhstan Time)

Andreyevka (Kazakh: Қызылжар, Qyzyljar; Russian: Андреевка, Andreyevka) is a town in Aktobe Region, west Kazakhstan. It lies at an altitude of 318 m (1,043 ft).
