= Birshoghyr =

Birshoghyr Біршоғыр Берчогур بىرشوعىر
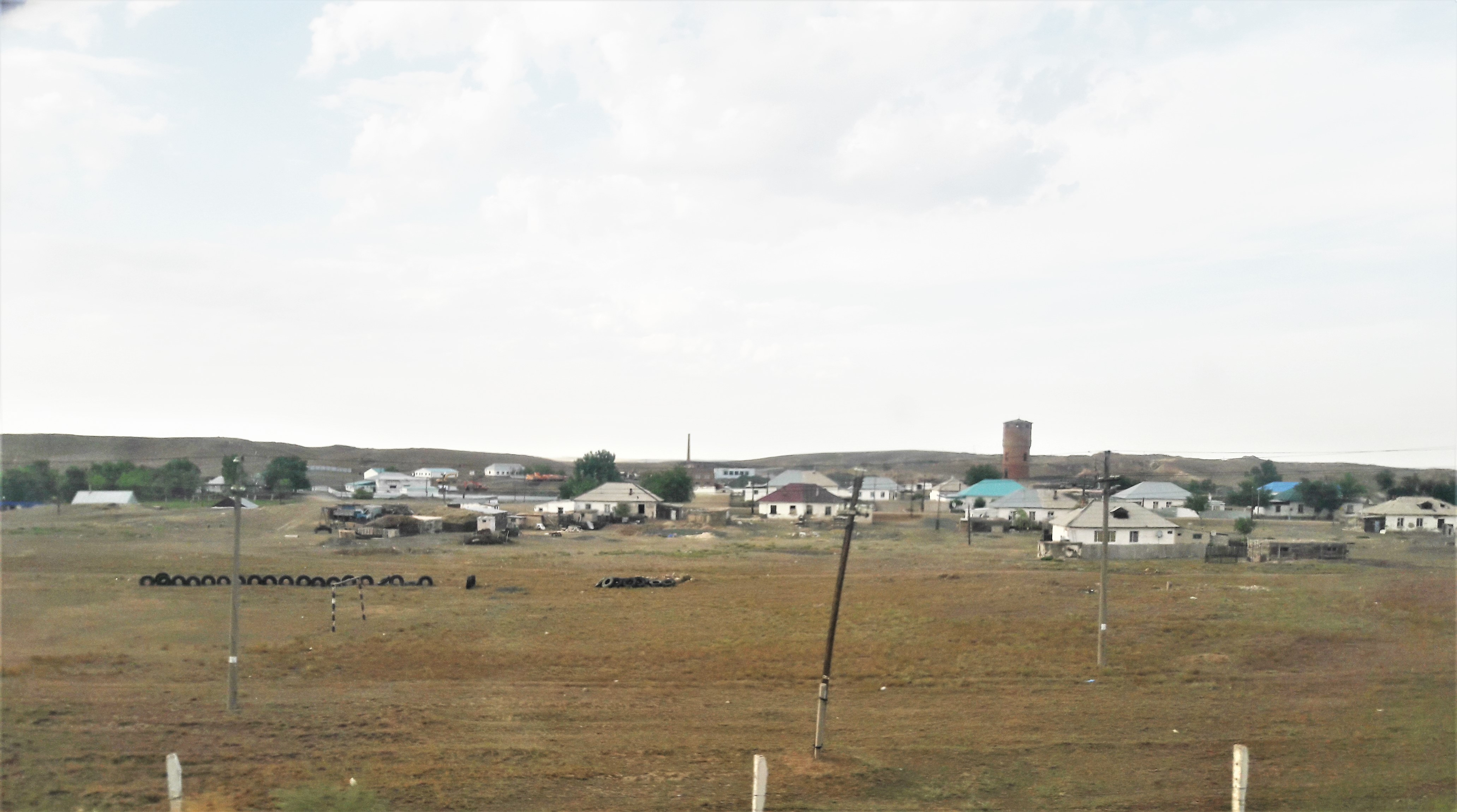

- Location within Kazakhstan
- Coordinates: 48°27′35″N 58°33′13″E
- Country: Kazakhstan
- Region: Aktobe
- Elevation: 396 m (1,299 ft)
- Time zone: UTC+5 (West Kazakhstan Time)
  - Summer (DST): UTC+5 (West Kazakhstan Time)

Birshoghyr (Kazakh: Біршоғыр, Bırşoğyr, بىرشوعىر; Russian: Биршогыр), known as Berchogur (Russian: Берчогур) during the Soviet era, is a town in Aktobe Region, west Kazakhstan. It lies at an altitude of 396 m (1,299 ft).
