= Aqqum =

Aqqum Аққұм Тышканбай اققۇم
- Location within Kazakhstan
- Coordinates: 50°04′35″N 62°07′27″E
- Country: Kazakhstan
- Region: Aktobe
- Elevation: 175 m (574 ft)
- Time zone: UTC+5 (West Kazakhstan Time)
  - Summer (DST): UTC+5 (West Kazakhstan Time)

Aqqum, also known as Tyshkanbay, (Kazakh: Аққұм, Aqqūm, اققۇم; Russian: Тышканбай, Tyshkanbay) is a town in Aktobe Region, west Kazakhstan. It lies at an altitude of 175 m (574 ft).
