= Karakhobda =

Karakhobda Qaraqobda
- Village
- Location in Kazakhstan
- Coordinates: 50°03′0″N 56°41′0″E
- Country: Kazakhstan
- Region: Aktobe Region
- Time zone: UTC+5 (Central Asia Time)

Karakhobda (Kazakh: Қарақобда, Qaraqobda) is a village in the Aktobe Region of western Kazakhstan.
