= Anastas'yevka =

Anastas'yevka Анастасьевка Анастасьевка اناستاسەۆكا
- Location within Kazakhstan
- Coordinates: 50°52′57″N 58°30′31″E
- Country: Kazakhstan
- Region: Aktobe
- Elevation: 335 m (1,099 ft)
- Time zone: UTC+5 (West Kazakhstan Time)
  - Summer (DST): UTC+5 (West Kazakhstan Time)

Anastas'yevka, also known as Anastas'evka (Kazakh: Анастасьевка, Anastasevka, اناستاسەۆكا; Russian: Анастасьевка, Anastas'yevka) is a town in Aktobe Region, west Kazakhstan. It lies at an altitude of 335 m (1,099 ft).
