= Astrakhanovka, Kazakhstan =

Astrakhanovka Жаңаталап Астрахановка
- Location within Kazakhstan
- Coordinates: 50°21′13″N 55°49′46″E
- Country: Kazakhstan
- Region: Aktobe
- Elevation: 182 m (597 ft)
- Time zone: UTC+5 (West Kazakhstan Time)
  - Summer (DST): UTC+5 (West Kazakhstan Time)

Astrakhanovka (also known as Astrakhanovskiy (Kazakh: Жаңаталап, Jañatalap; Russian: Астрахановка, Astrakhanovka)) is a town in Aktobe Region, west Kazakhstan. It lies at an altitude of 182 m (597 ft).
