= Altykarasu =

Altykarasu Алтықарасу Алтыкарасу التىقاراسۋ
- Location within Kazakhstan
- Coordinates: 49°12′08″N 55°52′05″E
- Country: Kazakhstan
- Region: Aktobe
- Elevation: 130 m (430 ft)
- Time zone: UTC+5 (West Kazakhstan Time)
  - Summer (DST): UTC+5 (West Kazakhstan Time)

Altykarasu, also known as Altyqarasu, (Kazakh: Алтықарасу, Altyqarasu, التىقاراسۋ; Russian: Алтыкарасу, Altykarasu) is a town in Aktobe Region, west Kazakhstan. It lies at an altitude of 130 m (430 ft).
