= Belogorka =

Belogorka Белогор Белогорка بەلوگور
- Location within Kazakhstan
- Coordinates: 50°21′50″N 57°38′21″E
- Country: Kazakhstan
- Region: Aktobe
- Elevation: 340 m (1,120 ft)
- Time zone: UTC+5 (West Kazakhstan Time)
  - Summer (DST): UTC+5 (West Kazakhstan Time)

Belogorka, also known as Belogorskiy, (Kazakh: Белогор, Belogor, بەلوگور; Russian: Белогорка, Belogorka) is a town in Aktobe Region, west Kazakhstan. It lies at an altitude of 340 m (1,120 ft).
