= Kumkuduk =

Kumkuduk Qumqudyq
- Village
- Location in Kazakhstan
- Coordinates: 50°28′11″N 61°13′9″E
- Country: Kazakhstan
- Region: Aktobe Region
- Time zone: UTC+5 (Central Asia Time)

Kumkuduk (Kazakh: Құмқұдық, Qūmqūdyq) is a village in the Aktobe Region of western Kazakhstan.
