= Kandyagash =

Kandyagash Қандыағаш
- Town
- Location in Aktobe Province, Kazakhstan
- Coordinates: 49°27′20″N 57°24′58″E
- Country: Kazakhstan
- Region: Aktobe Region
- District: Mugalzhar District
- Railway station: 1905

Population (2009)
  - Total: 29,169
- Time zone: UTC+5 (Yekaterinburg Time)

Kandyagash (Kazakh: Қандыағаш, Qandyağaş) is a town and the administrative center of Mugalzhar District in Aktobe Region of western Kazakhstan. Population: 29,169 (2009 census results); 25,553 (1999 census results).

== History ==
Kandyagash (also spelled as Kandygach) was founded in 1905 as a railway station. At the time, Kandagach was a part of Aktyubinsky Uyezd of Turgay Oblast.

In 1920, Turgay Oblast was transformed to Turgay Governorate, and in 1921, it was abolished and included into Orenburg-Turgay Governorate. In the same year, Kandagach was transferred to Aktyubinsk Governorate of Kirghiz Autonomous Soviet Socialist Republic. In 1925, the republic was renamed Kazak Autonomous Socialist Soviet Republic. On January 17, 1928 the governorate was abolished, and Kandagach was transferred to Aktyubinsk Okrug. The uyezds were abolished as well.

In 1932, Aktobe Region was established. On July 5, 1933 Klyuchevoy District (currently Alga District) was established, and Kandyagach became a part of this district. In 1936, the republic was transformed into Kazakh Soviet Socialist Republic. By 1958, Kandagach already have the status of urban-type settlement. In 1963, in the course of abortive Khrushchev's administrative reform, a number of districts were merged into Kandagach Industrial District, with the administrative center in Kandyagash.

In the 1960s, substantial phosphate deposits were discovered nearby (Chilisay deposits). In 1967, the administrative divisions of Aktobe Region were changed, and Oktyabrsky District (currently Mugalzhar District) was created. Kandyagash was granted town status, renamed Oktyabrsk (to commemorate 50 years after the October Revolution), and made the administrative center of the district.

Subsequently, a large plant serving the phosphate deposits was built and became by far the largest industrial enterprise in the town. Until the 1990s, Oktyabrsk experienced a rapid growth of population. After Kazakhstan became independent in 1991, the plant was basically abandoned, and the town got into a very difficult situation when most of the population was unemployed and most of the communications non-existent. By 1997, the population was halved. In the 1990s, the emergency state was introduced in the town. In 1997, Oktyabrsk was renamed Kandyagash. The town was subsequently reoriented to serve natural gas deposits.

== Economy ==
=== Industry ===
Kandyagash has a chemical plant and a construction materials plant, as well as the oil refinery.

=== Transportation ===
Kandyagash is a rail junction station, where two railways cross: The Trans-Aral Railway, which connects Orenburg and Tashkent via Aktobe and Kyzylorda, and another one connecting Sol-Iletsk with Atyrau and further with Astrakhan. In contrast to the town itself, the station was never renamed.

The town is connected by roads with Aktobe, Atyrau, and Embi.

== Sport ==
Bandy is being developed in Kandyagash.
