= Alpyspay =

Alpyspay Алпыспай
- Location within Kazakhstan
- Coordinates: 49°39′26″N 57°20′22″E
- Country: Kazakhstan
- Region: Aktobe
- Elevation: 181 m (594 ft)
- Time zone: UTC+5 (West Kazakhstan Time)
  - Summer (DST): UTC+5 (West Kazakhstan Time)

Alpyspay (Russian: Алпыспай, Alpyspay) is a town in Aktobe Region, west Kazakhstan. It lies at an altitude of 181 m (594 ft).
