= Saryqobda =

Saryqobda Сарықобда
- Aul
- Location in Aktobe Province, Kazakhstan Saryqobda (Asia)
- Coordinates: 49°48′33″N 56°26′49″E
- Country: Kazakhstan
- Region: Aktobe
- District: Alga District

Population (2009)
  - Total: 428

Saryqobda (Kazakh: Сарықобда, Saryqobda) is an aul in the Aktobe Region of Kazakhstan. It was known until 1993 as Bessarabka (Kazakh: Бессарабка, Bessarabka). Together with the village of Moldavanka, it one of the two villages founded by Bessarabian Romanian immigrants at the beginning of the 20th century in Kazakhstan.

== See also ==
- Romanians in Kazakhstan
