= Altyndy =

Altyndy Алтынды Алтынды التىندى
- Location within Kazakhstan
- Coordinates: 48°56′43″N 58°41′10″E
- Country: Kazakhstan
- Region: Aktobe
- Elevation: 402 m (1,319 ft)
- Time zone: UTC+5 (West Kazakhstan Time)
  - Summer (DST): UTC+5 (West Kazakhstan Time)

Altyndy (Kazakh: Алтынды, Altyndy, التىندى, Russian: Алтынды, Altyndy) is a town in Aktobe Region, west Kazakhstan. It lies at an altitude of 402 m (1,319 ft).
