= Bayganin District =

Coordinates: 47°18′36″N 56°43′48″E

Bayganin Байғанин
- District
- Байғанин ауданы
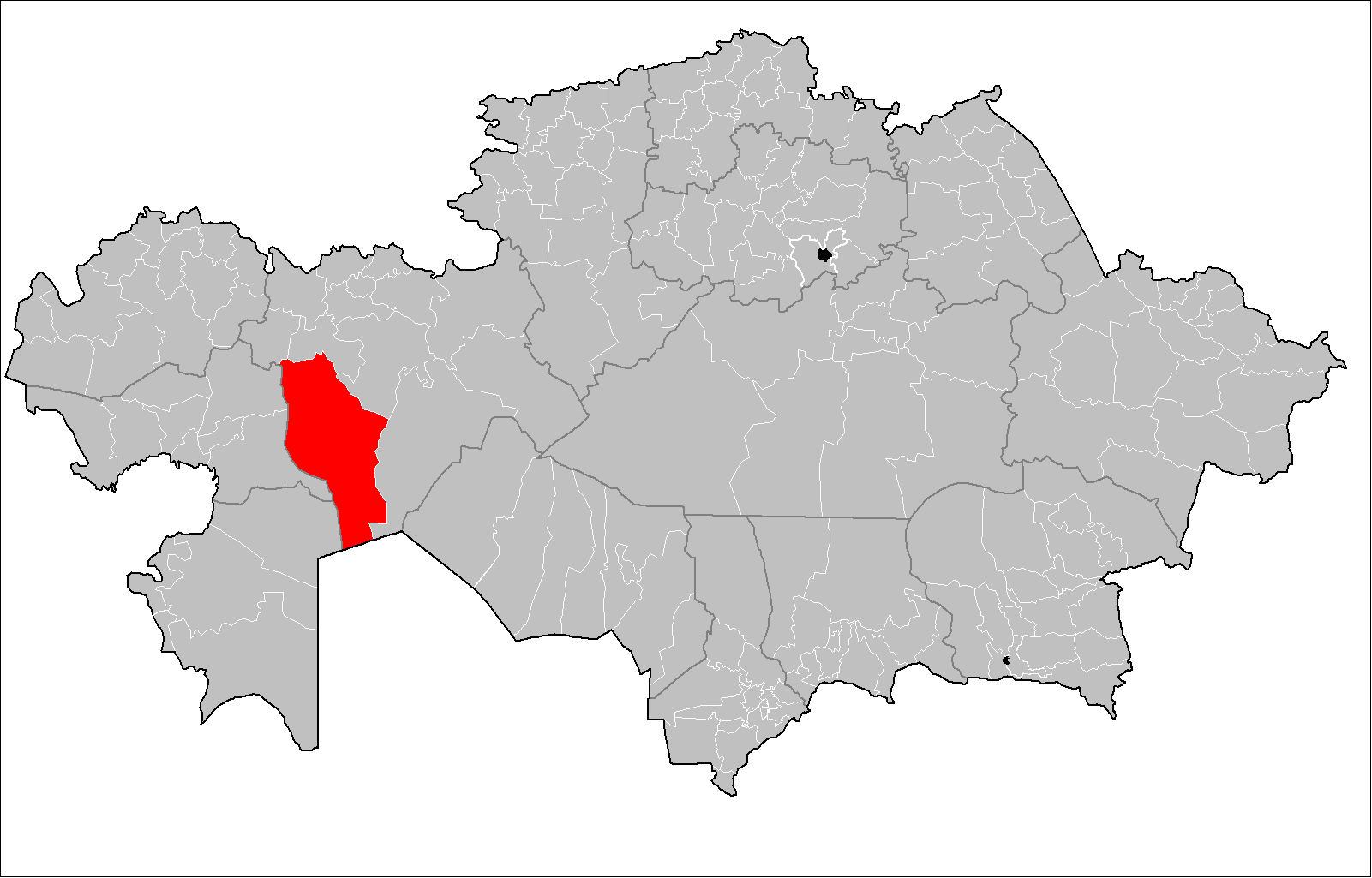
- Country: Kazakhstan
- Region: Aktobe Region
- Administrative center: Karauilkeldy

Government
  - Akim: Aibek Kupenov

Population (2013)
  - Total: 22,807
- Time zone: UTC+5 (West)

Bayganin (Kazakh: Байғанин ауданы, Baiğanin audany) is a district of Aktobe Region in Kazakhstan. Named in honor of Nurpeis Baiganin (1860–1945), a renowned Kazakh traditional folk poet, singer, and master of aitys (improvised musical poetry contests). The administrative center of the district is the selo of Karauilkeldy. Population: 22,807 (2013 estimate); 22,073 (2009 census results); 24,652 (1999 census results).
