= Temir =

- Town
- Interactive map of Temir
- Coordinates: 49°8′29″N 57°7′48″E
- Country: Kazakhstan
- Region: Aktobe Region
- Time zone: UTC+5 (Central Asia Time)

Temir (Kazakh: Темір, Temır) is a town in Aktobe Region of western Kazakhstan. It serves as the administrative center of Temir District. Population: 2,678 (2009 census results); 2,310 (1999 census results).

== Climate ==
Climate data for Temir (1991–2020, extremes 1948–present)
| Month | Jan | Feb | Mar | Apr | May | Jun | Jul | Aug | Sep | Oct | Nov | Dec | Year |
|---|---|---|---|---|---|---|---|---|---|---|---|---|---|
| Record high °C (°F) | 5.0 (41.0) | 6.1 (43.0) | 24.1 (75.4) | 32.0 (89.6) | 41.4 (106.5) | 42.2 (108.0) | 44.9 (112.8) | 43.8 (110.8) | 45.8 (114.4) | 30.2 (86.4) | 19.0 (66.2) | 10.2 (50.4) | 45.8 (114.4) |
| Mean daily maximum °C (°F) | −8.0 (17.6) | −6.8 (19.8) | 0.7 (33.3) | 14.6 (58.3) | 23.2 (73.8) | 29.2 (84.6) | 31.1 (88.0) | 29.9 (85.8) | 22.7 (72.9) | 13.5 (56.3) | 1.9 (35.4) | −5.3 (22.5) | 12.2 (54.0) |
| Daily mean °C (°F) | −12.0 (10.4) | −11.6 (11.1) | −4.1 (24.6) | 8.1 (46.6) | 16.1 (61.0) | 21.9 (71.4) | 24.0 (75.2) | 22.3 (72.1) | 14.9 (58.8) | 6.6 (43.9) | −2.6 (27.3) | −9.2 (15.4) | 6.2 (43.2) |
| Mean daily minimum °C (°F) | −16.0 (3.2) | −15.9 (3.4) | −8.5 (16.7) | 2.3 (36.1) | 9.0 (48.2) | 14.3 (57.7) | 16.6 (61.9) | 14.6 (58.3) | 7.7 (45.9) | 0.9 (33.6) | −6.0 (21.2) | −12.9 (8.8) | 0.5 (32.9) |
| Record low °C (°F) | −41.1 (−42.0) | −38.9 (−38.0) | −37.2 (−35.0) | −22.2 (−8.0) | −6.1 (21.0) | −1.8 (28.8) | 2.8 (37.0) | 2.0 (35.6) | −7.2 (19.0) | −18.0 (−0.4) | −30.0 (−22.0) | −35.9 (−32.6) | −41.1 (−42.0) |
| Average precipitation mm (inches) | 23.6 (0.93) | 22.2 (0.87) | 24.6 (0.97) | 23.3 (0.92) | 33.9 (1.33) | 25.4 (1.00) | 23.0 (0.91) | 11.8 (0.46) | 12.4 (0.49) | 22.1 (0.87) | 25.3 (1.00) | 30.1 (1.19) | 277.7 (10.93) |
| Average precipitation days (≥ 1.0 mm) | 6.7 | 5.6 | 5.7 | 5.1 | 5.8 | 4.0 | 3.3 | 2.4 | 3.0 | 4.6 | 5.2 | 7.3 | 58.7 |
Source 1: Погода и Климат
Source 2: NOAA NCEI
