= Khromtau District =

Coordinates: 50°16′12″N 58°27′00″E

Khromtau
- District
- Хромтау ауданы
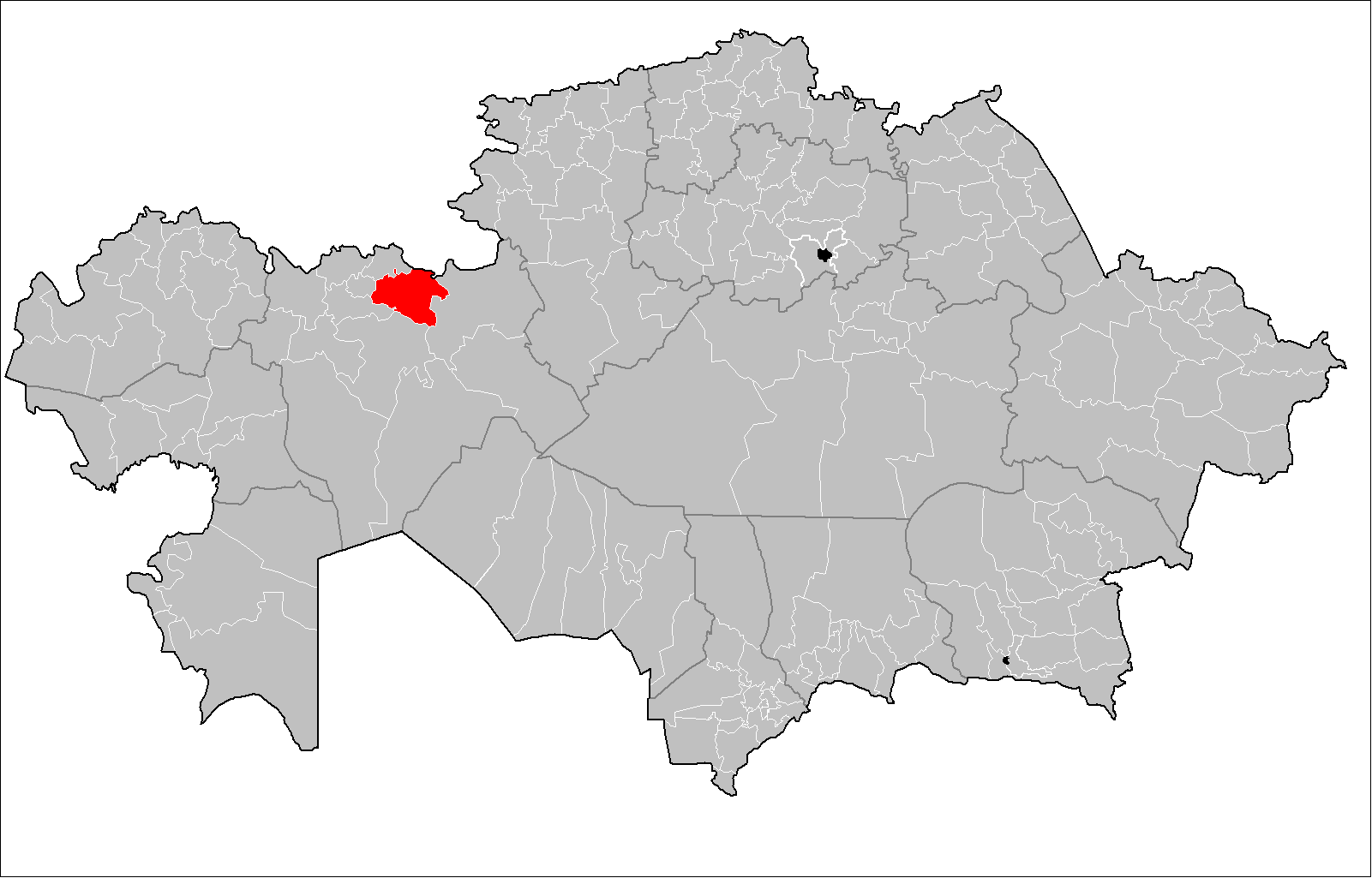
- Country: Kazakhstan
- Region: Aktobe Region
- Administrative center: Khromtau

Government
  - Akim: Beket Azamat Bauyrzhanovich

Population (2013)
  - Total: 41,334
- Time zone: UTC+5 (West)
- Website: http://hromtau.aktobe.gov.kz/

Khromtau (Kazakh: Хромтау ауданы, Hromtau audany) is a district of Aktobe Region in Kazakhstan. The administrative center of the district is the town of Khromtau. Population: 41,334 (2013 estimate); 39,748 (2009 census results); 43,814 (1999 census results).
