= Khromtau =

Khromtau Хромтау
- Nur mosque in Khromtau

- Location in Kazakhstan
- Coordinates: 50°15′1″N 58°26′5″E
- Country: Kazakhstan
- Region: Aktobe Region
- District: Khromtau District

Population (2008)
  - Total: 21,156

Khromtau (Kazakh: Хромтау, Hromtau) is a town in Aktobe Region of Kazakhstan, the administrative center of Khromtau District. It was formed in 1967. Population: 21,740 (2009 census results); 24,089 (1999 census results).

Khromtau has important Chromium deposits, which are currently exploited in underground mines by Kazchrome, a subsidiary of Eurasian Natural Resources Corporation (ENRC). Previously, Chromite ore was mined in open cast mines, which left enormous pits behind.

The newly built mosque and the also new Russian orthodox church are juxtaposed on the main square of town.

FC Gornyak soccer team played in the Kazakhstan First Division. They are now defunct.

The colours of the bandy team Gornyak are green and white. They played a test match against Akzhaiyk at Medeu before the 2011 Asian Winter Games, but have no adult team in league as they used to. Nowadays young players is the focus. The town sent a bandy team to the Spartakiade 2009. Aktobe Region, made up by players from Khromtau, won the Spartakiade in 2013. For the 2014-15 season, two youth teams were allowed to participate in the leagues of Sverdlovsk Oblast. Two players from Khromtau, Sultan Kadyrzhanov and Kuanysh Tiemiralin has played in Kazakhstan's only professional club, Akzhaiyk from Oral. Sultan was also part of the Kazakh team at the 2011 Asian Winter Games and his World Championship debut came in 2018. A national youth championship has been organised. 2016 Gornyak won the national championship for junior players born in 1999-2000 on home ice and in 2017 there was a victory in Oral.
