= Oiyl =

Coordinates: 49°14′24″N 54°27′00″E

Oiyl (Kazakh: Ойыл, romanized: Oyıl) is a village and the administrative center of Oiyl district of Aktobe Region in Kazakhstan.
