= Martuk District =

District in Aktobe Region, Kazakhstan

Coordinates: 50°46′12″N 56°30′36″E

Martuk
- District
- Мәртөк ауданы
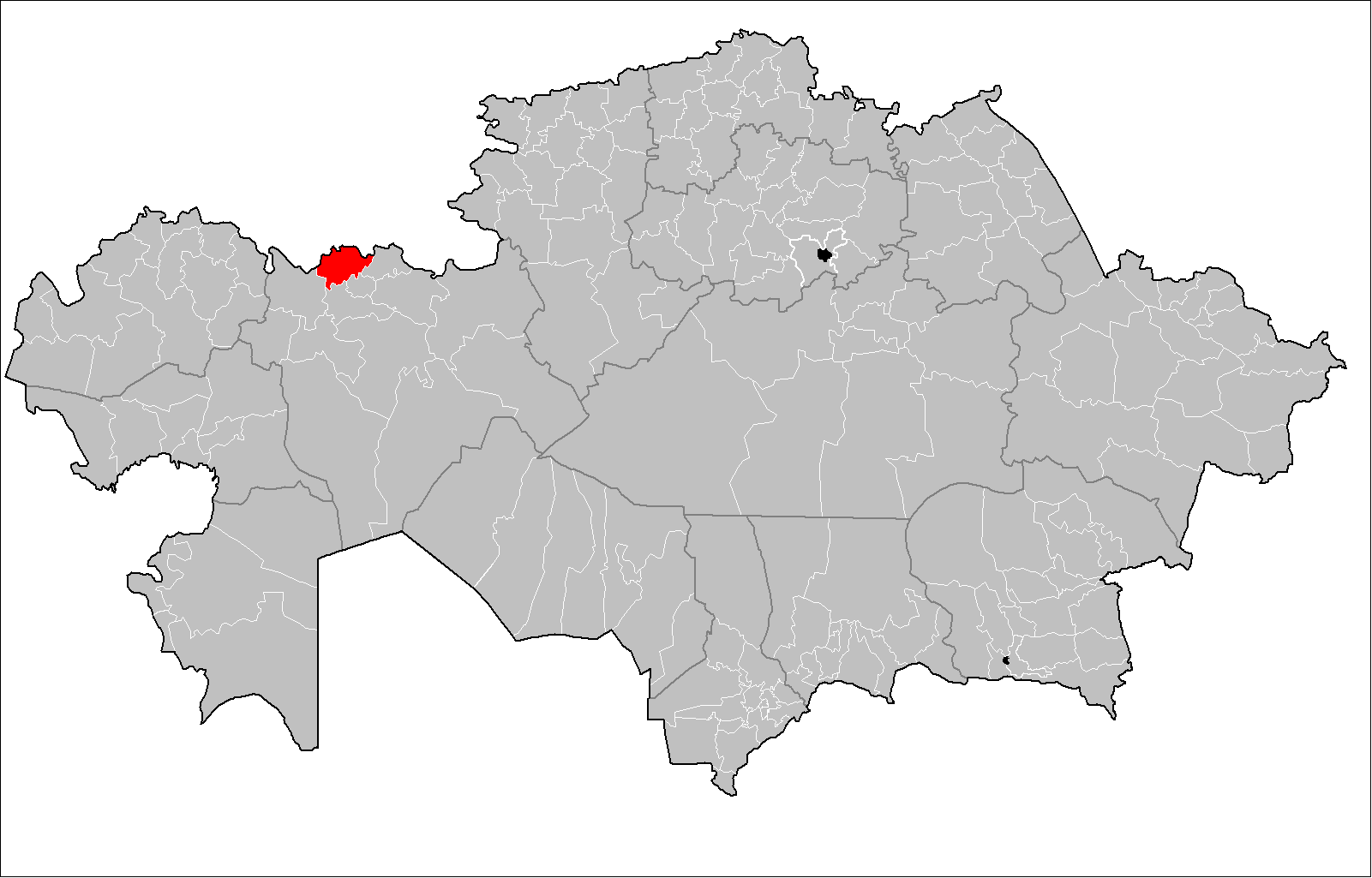
- Country: Kazakhstan
- Region: Akmola Region
- Administrative center: Martuk

Government
  - Akim: Medet Iskakov

Population (2013)
  - Total: 29,647
- Time zone: UTC+5 (West)

Martuk (Kazakh: Мәртөк ауданы, Märtök audany) is a district of Aktobe Region in Kazakhstan. The administrative center of the district is the selo of Martuk. Population: 29,647 (2013 estimate); 29,843 (2009 census results); 31,084 (1999 census results).

== Villages ==
- 13 let Kasakhstan Population: 123 (2009 census results).
