= Kargaly District =

Coordinates: 50°52′48″N 58°09′00″E

Kargaly
- District
- Қарғалы ауданы
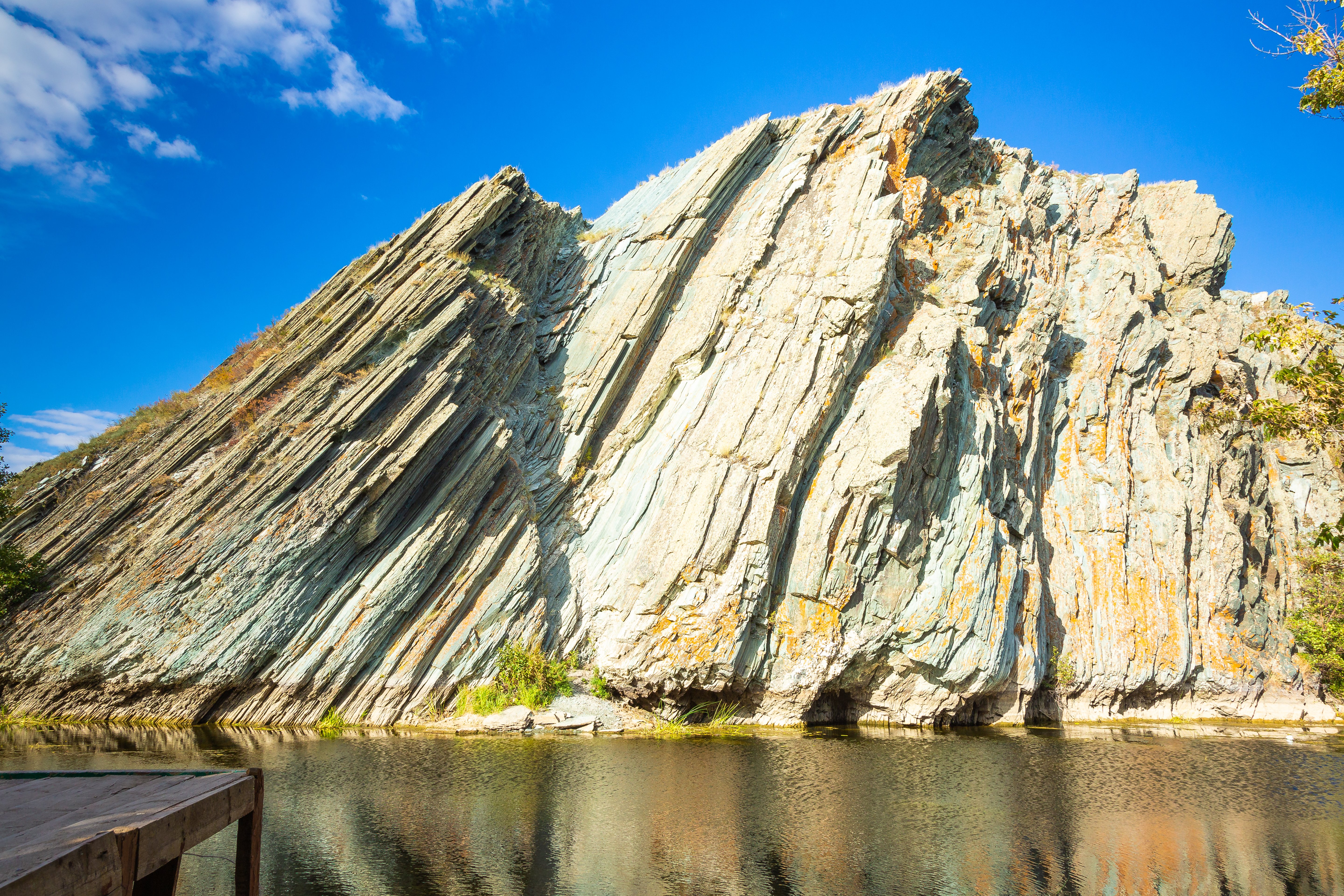
- Nemoy Aul, Ebita river

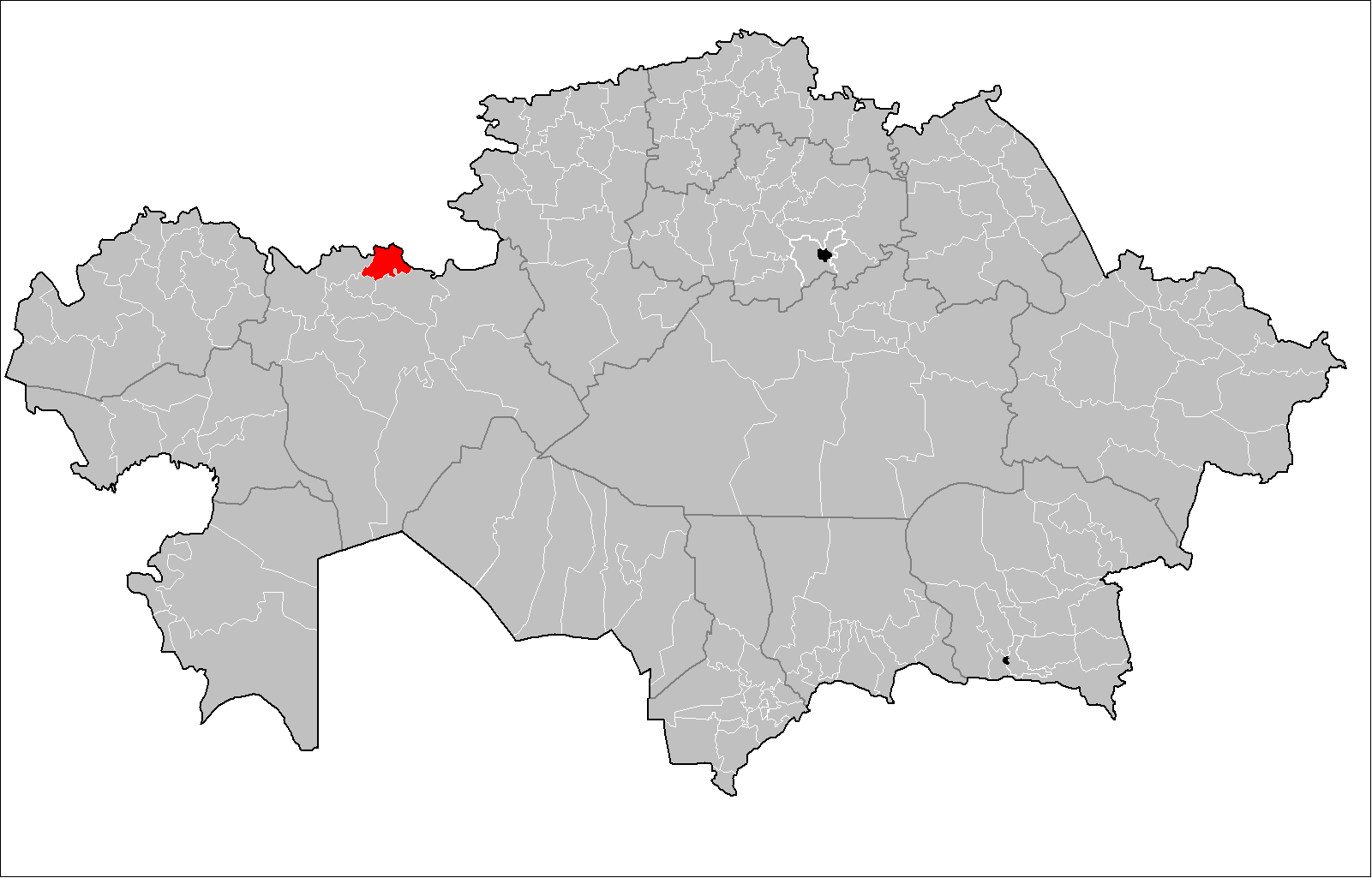
- Country: Kazakhstan
- Region: Aktobe Region
- Administrative center: Badamsha

Government
  - Akim: Dzhusibaliyev Askar Kazikhanovich

Population (2013)
  - Total: 16,741
- Time zone: UTC+5 (West)

Kargaly (Kazakh: Қарғалы ауданы, Qarğaly audany) is a district of Aktobe Region in Kazakhstan. The administrative center of the district is the settlement of Badamsha. Population: 16,741 (2013 estimate); 16,781 (2009 census results); 19,172 (1999 census results).
