= Romanians in Uzbekistan =

Romanian: Românii din Uzbekistan Uzbek: Ruminiya o'zbeklari

Total population
- 6,000

Languages
- Romanian (native), Uzbek, Russian

Religion
- Predominantly Eastern Orthodox Christianity

Related ethnic groups
- Romanians (including Moldovans)

The Romanians in Uzbekistan are an ethnic Romanian minority in Uzbekistan. In the 1989 Soviet census, 158 Romanians and 5,955 Moldovans, which Romanian media has claimed as also being part of the Romanian minority of the country, were registered in the Uzbek Soviet Socialist Republic. Most of the Romanians in Uzbekistan come from the regions of Bessarabia, the Hertsa region and Northern Bukovina, all of which used to be part of Romania, but also from the Odesa and Zakarpattia Oblasts of modern-day Ukraine and the former Moldovan Autonomous Soviet Socialist Republic, where important Romanian communities live.

The Romanian minority of Uzbekistan arrived to this country through several migration waves. The first was during the period of rule of the Russian Empire over Bessarabia. Some Romanians migrated to modern Uzbekistan after being promised lands by the Russian authorities in areas such as the Fergana Valley, with some posteriorly returning while others staying. Others migrated as military personnel, artisans, workers or civil servants. Some ethnic Romanian POWs from World War 1 (mostly from Transsylvania which fought in the Austro-Hungarian Army), detained in Uzbekistan, decided to remain there after the end of the war.

The second wave occurred as a result of the Soviet deportations from Bessarabia and Northern Bukovina, after which many Romanians were taken to Uzbekistan, but also to other places like Kazakhstan or Siberia. During World War 2, many ethnic Romanians which lived of the Eastern Front were evacuated to Uzbekistan, some of which decided to remain there after the end of the war. After the 1966 Tashkent earthquake, ethnic Romanians from Moldovan SSR and the Ukrainian SSR migrated to the Uzbek SSR, in order to help the rebuild of the capital.

After the fall of the Soviet Union, some ethnic Romanians held important positions in the Uzbek Orthodox Community, such as Vladimir Ikim (the first Metropolitan of Tashkent and Central Asia) or Vincent Morari (the current Metropolitan of Tashkent and Central Asia).

According to Romanian media, most of the Romanians of the country are actually considered Moldovans by the Uzbek authorities.

== See also ==
- Romania–Uzbekistan relations
- Romanian diaspora
  - Moldovan diaspora
- Romanians in Kazakhstan
- Romanians in Kyrgyzstan
