= Romanians in Kyrgyzstan =

Ethnic group

Romanian: Românii din Kârgâzstan Kyrgyz: Кыргыз румындары

Total population
- 1,000

Languages
- Romanian (native), Kyrgyz, Russian

Religion
- Predominantly Eastern Orthodox Christianity

Related ethnic groups
- Romanians (including Moldovans)

The Romanians in Kyrgyzstan are an ethnic Romanian minority in Kyrgyzstan. Most of the Romanians in Kyrgyzstan come from the regions of Bessarabia, the Hertsa region and Northern Bukovina, all of which used to be part of Romania, but also from the Odesa and Zakarpattia Oblasts of modern-day Ukraine and the former Moldovan Autonomous Soviet Socialist Republic, where important Romanian communities live.

The Romanian minority of Kyrgyzstan arrived to this country through several migration waves. The first was during the period of rule of the Russian Empire over Bessarabia. Some Romanians migrated to modern Kazakhstan after being promised lands by the Russian authorities, with some posteriorly returning while others staying. Others migrated as military personnel, artisans, workers or civil servants. Some ethnic Romanian POWs from World War 1 (mostly from Transylvania which fought in the Austro-Hungarian Army), detained in Kyrgyzstan, decided to remain there after the end of the war. The second wave occurred as a result of the Soviet deportations from Bessarabia and Northern Bukovina, after which many Romanians which were initially taken to Kazakhstan and Siberia migrated to the Kyrgyz SSR. During World War 2, many ethnic Romanians which lived of the Eastern Front were evacuated to Kyrgyzstan, some of which decided to remain there after the end of the war.

According to Romanian media, most of the Romanians of the country are actually considered Moldovans by the Kyrgyz authorities.

In Kyrgyzstan there are no Romanian Orthodox churches, so Romanians attend Russian Orthodox churches like other non-Russian Orthodox minorities in the country.

== Notable people ==
- Mikhail Frunze (1885-1925) - Bolshevik revolutionary and Soviet statesman (Romanian father)
- Theodosius (Gaju) (b. 1970) - Bishop of Bishkek and Kyrgyzstan

== See also ==
- Romanian diaspora
  - Moldovan diaspora
- Romanians in Kazakhstan
- Romanians in Uzbekistan
