= Martuk =

Coordinates: 50.7464°N 56.4965°E

Martuk (Kazakh: Мәртөк, Märtök) is a village and the administrative center of Martuk district of Aktobe Region in Kazakhstan. It is located at a height of 181 m above sea level.

== Population ==
At the 2012 census, Martuk had a population of 9513.

== Climate ==
Martuk has a humid continental climate (Köppen: Dfa), with hot summers and very cold winters.

Climate data for Martuk (1991–2020)
Month	Jan	Feb	Mar	Apr	May	Jun	Jul	Aug	Sep	Oct	Nov	Dec	Year
Mean daily maximum °C (°F)	−8.2 (17.2)	−7.0 (19.4)	0.0 (32.0)	14.0 (57.2)	22.9 (73.2)	28.1 (82.6)	29.9 (85.8)	28.8 (83.8)	21.8 (71.2)	12.4 (54.3)	1.0 (33.8)	−5.9 (21.4)	11.5 (52.7)
Daily mean °C (°F)	−12.2 (10.0)	−11.7 (10.9)	−4.8 (23.4)	7.4 (45.3)	15.5 (59.9)	20.7 (69.3)	22.6 (72.7)	21.0 (69.8)	14.0 (57.2)	6.0 (42.8)	−3.0 (26.6)	−9.8 (14.4)	5.5 (41.9)
Mean daily minimum °C (°F)	−16.2 (2.8)	−16.0 (3.2)	−8.9 (16.0)	1.7 (35.1)	8.3 (46.9)	13.3 (55.9)	15.5 (59.9)	13.6 (56.5)	7.4 (45.3)	1.0 (33.8)	−6.3 (20.7)	−13.5 (7.7)	-0.0 (32.0)
Average precipitation mm (inches)	29 (1.1)	23.7 (0.93)	28.1 (1.11)	28.5 (1.12)	32.1 (1.26)	29.5 (1.16)	34.2 (1.35)	20.1 (0.79)	20.6 (0.81)	31.5 (1.24)	29.3 (1.15)	34.7 (1.37)	341.4 (13.44)
Average precipitation days (≥ 1.0 mm)	8.3	6.2	6.4	5.2	5.5	4.9	4.5	3.7	4.0	6.3	6.9	8.3	70.2
Source: NOAA
