= Temir District =

Coordinates: 49°09′36″N 56°27′36″E

Temir
- District
- Temır audany
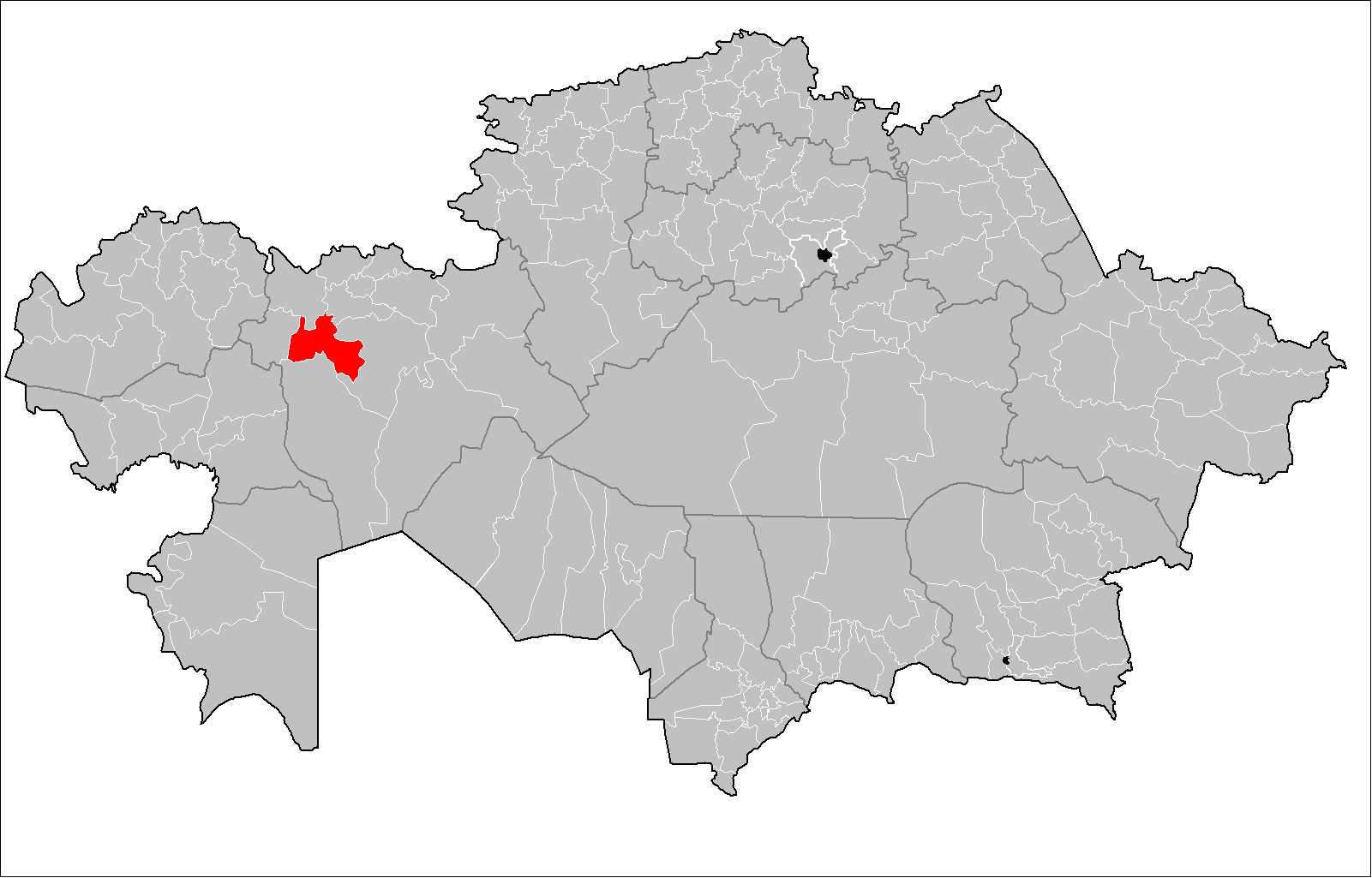
- Country: Kazakhstan
- Region: Aktobe Region
- Administrative center: Temir

Government
  - Akim: Amanbaev Salamat Ermukhanovich

Population (2013)
  - Total: 36,551
- Time zone: UTC+5 (West)

Temir (Kazakh: Темір ауданы, Temır audany) is a district of Aktobe Region in Kazakhstan. The administrative center of the district is the town of Temir. Population: 36,551 (2013 estimate); 34,425 (2009 census results); 35,946 (1999 census results).
