= Oiyl District =

Coordinates: 49°14′24″N 54°27′00″E

Oiyl
- District
- Ойыл ауданы
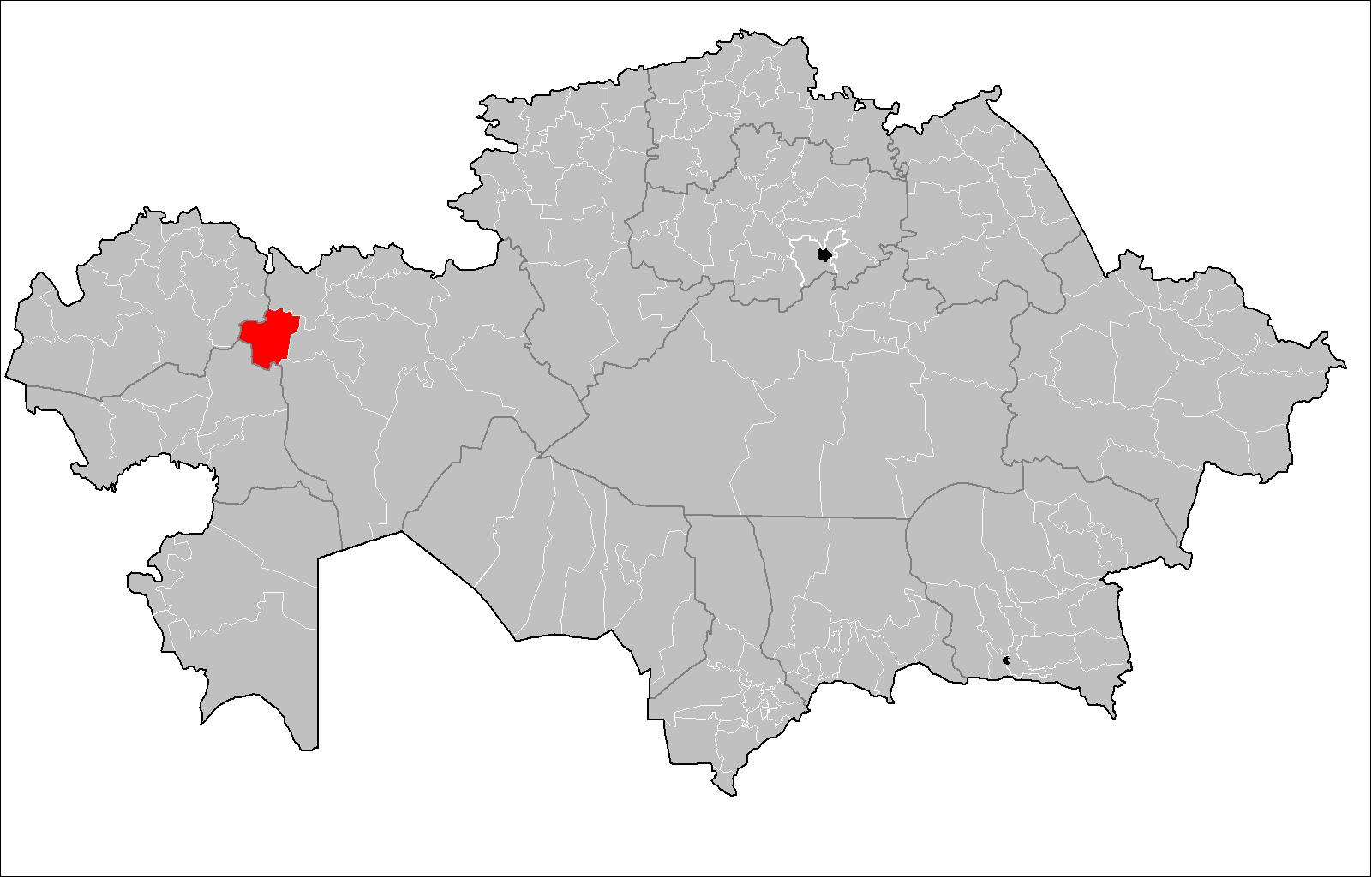
- Country: Kazakhstan
- Region: Aktobe Region
- Administrative center: Oiyl

Government
  - Akim: Kazybaev Askar Kairgalievich

Population (2013)
  - Total: 18,914
- Time zone: UTC+5 (West)
- Website: http://uil.aktobe.gov.kz/ru

Oiyl (Kazakh: Ойыл ауданы, Oiyl audany) is a district of Aktobe Region in Kazakhstan. The administrative center of the selo of Oiyl. Population: 18,914 (2013 estimate); 18,619 (2009 census results); 20,865 (1999 census results).
