= Ebita =

Ebita Эбита
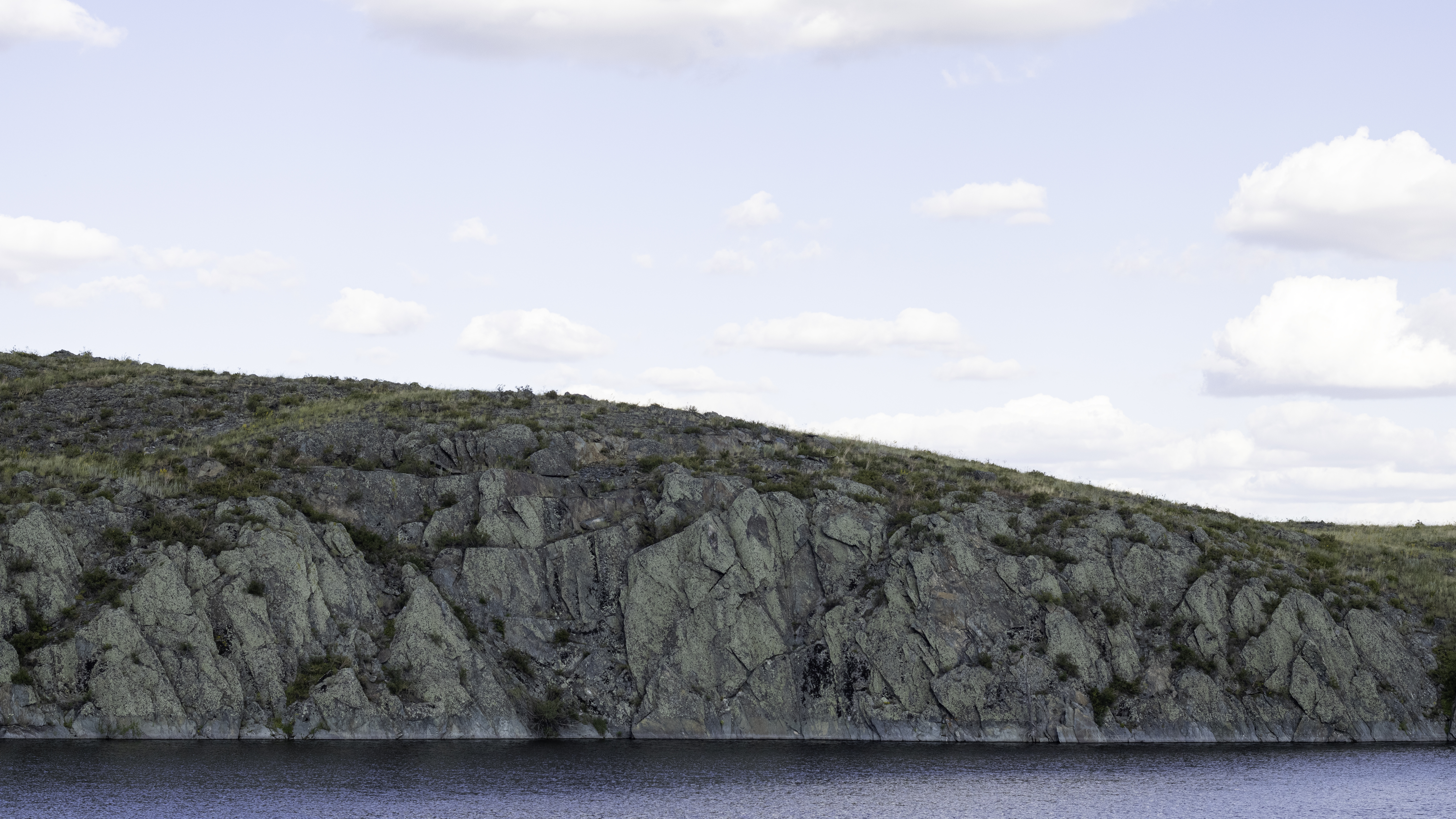
- Ebita rocks

- Mouth location in Kazakhstan

Physical characteristics
- Source
  - coordinates: 50°50′57″N 58°08′24″E
- Mouth: Ural
  - coordinates: 51°03′53″N 58°10′39″E
- Length: 47 km (29 mi)

Basin features
- Progression: Ural→ Caspian Sea

The Ebita (Kazakh: Шошка; Russian: Эбита), also known as Shoshka or Chaushka in the upper reaches, is a river in Kazakhstan, a tributary of the Ural. It is 47 kilometres (29 mi) long, and flows across the Kargaly District, Aktobe Region.

The Ebita Nature Reserve, a 83,770 hectares (207,000 acres) steppe and forest-steppe protected area, is located by the banks of the river.

== Course ==
Its sources are located in the southern spurs of the Ural Mountains. It flows roughly northwards, close to the Kazakhstan–Russia border, southwest of Novotroitsk. Finally it joins the left bank of the Ural 1,662 km (1,033 mi) from its mouth.

== See also ==
- List of rivers of Kazakhstan
