= Embi =

Embi Ембі
- Town
- Location in Aktobe Province, Kazakhstan
- Coordinates: 48°49′52″N 58°08′55″E
- Country: Kazakhstan
- Region: Aktobe Region
- District: Mugalzhar District
- Settlement: 1870
- Elevation: 762 ft (232 m)

Population (2009)
  - Total: 11,212
- Time zone: UTC+05:00 (Kazakhstan Time)

Embi (Kazakh: Ембі, Embı) is a town in Mugalzhar District in Aktobe Region of western Kazakhstan. The town is on the left bank of the Emba River. Population: 11,212 (2009 census results); 12,345 (1999 census results).

== History ==
Embi (or Emba) was founded in the 1900s, when the railroad connecting Orenburg and Tashkent was built. At the time, it was a part of Turgay Oblast. After a number of administrative transformations, in 1936 Embi ended up in Kazakh Soviet Socialist Republic. Embi was a part of Aktobe Region. In 1937, it was granted status of urban-type settlement. By 1958, it belonged to Zhoryn District, which was eventually abolished and merged into Oktyabrsky District (which was later renamed Mugalzhar District). In 1967, Embi was granted town status.

The former military installation to the south of Embi known as "Embi-5" was renamed Zhem and was granted town status.

During the 2022 Kazakh protests, protesters in Embi demanded removal of the mayor. On 13 March 2022, Embi held a free and fair election, in which independent Raiymbek Musaghali was elected among three candidates with 81% of votes. Musaghali was 39 years old and worked as a school director.

== Economy ==
=== Industry ===
Embi is mostly serving the railway station, there is also food industry present.

=== Transportation ===
Embi is a railway station on the Trans-Aral Railway, which connects Orenburg and Tashkent. It is also connected to Kandyagash by a road. The same road continues east of Embi to provide access to the E38 highway between Aktobe and Shymkent.
