= Alga, Kazakhstan =

Alga
- town
- Location in Aktobe Province, Kazakhstan Alga (Asia)
- Coordinates: 49°54′10″N 57°20′0″E
- Country: Kazakhstan
- Region: Aktobe Region
- Established: 1961
- Elevation: 270 m (890 ft)

Population (2009)
  - Total: 19 705
- Time zone: UTC+5 (Yekaterinburg Time)
- Postal code: 030200
- Area code: +7 71337

Alga (Kazakh: Алға, Alğa) is a town in the Aktobe Region of western Kazakhstan. It is situated on the western bank of the Ilek (Jelek) River, and on the railway line from Aktobe to Aralsk. Population: 19,705 (2009 census results);15,372 (1999 census results).

It used to have a chemical phosphate plant which is now a ruin, but caused a lasting environmental damage as large quantities of chemical waste was collected in ponds without insulation to the aquifer.

== Climate ==
Climate data for Alga
Month	Jan	Feb	Mar	Apr	May	Jun	Jul	Aug	Sep	Oct	Nov	Dec	Year
Mean daily maximum °C (°F)	−9.9 (14.2)	−9.1 (15.6)	−2.2 (28.0)	12.9 (55.2)	22.8 (73.0)	27.7 (81.9)	30.1 (86.2)	28.2 (82.8)	21.5 (70.7)	10.4 (50.7)	0.3 (32.5)	−6.1 (21.0)	10.6 (51.0)
Mean daily minimum °C (°F)	−19.2 (−2.6)	−19.3 (−2.7)	−12.1 (10.2)	0.3 (32.5)	7.7 (45.9)	12.6 (54.7)	15.3 (59.5)	12.7 (54.9)	6.7 (44.1)	−0.8 (30.6)	−7.7 (18.1)	−14.4 (6.1)	−1.5 (29.3)
Average precipitation mm (inches)	23 (0.9)	19 (0.7)	20 (0.8)	29 (1.1)	26 (1.0)	29 (1.1)	25 (1.0)	25 (1.0)	21 (0.8)	29 (1.1)	27 (1.1)	27 (1.1)	300 (11.8)
Source: Climate-data.org
