= Zhem, Kazakhstan =

Zhem Emba-5
- Town
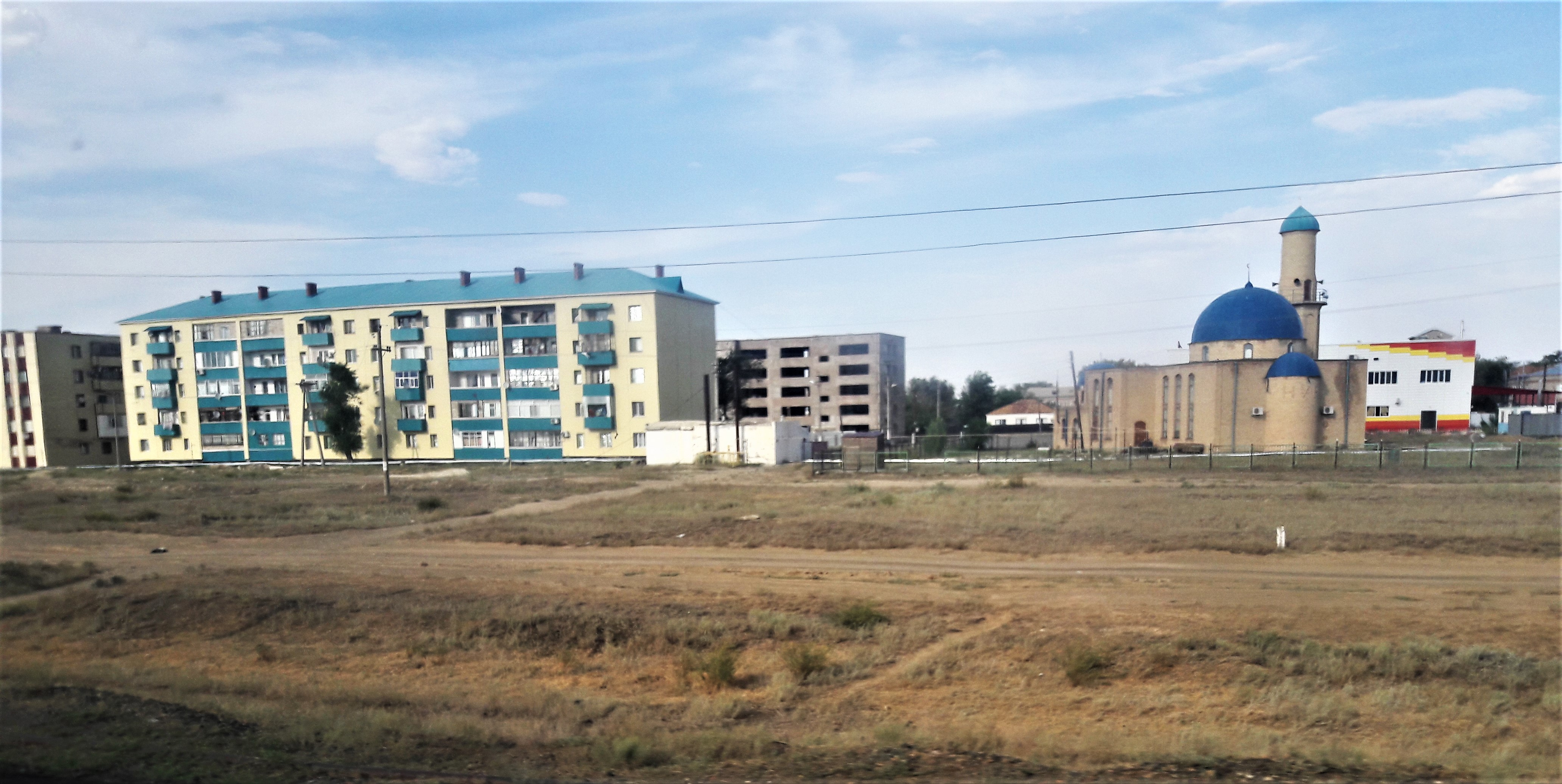

- Location in Aktobe Province, Kazakhstan
- Coordinates: 48°46′11″N 58°04′17″E
- Country: Kazakhstan
- Region: Aktobe Region
- District: Mugalzhar District

Population (2009)
  - Total: 1,936
- Time zone: UTC+5 (Yekaterinburg Time)

Zhem, Kazakhstan, (Kazakh: Жем, Jem) is a town in Atyrau Region of Kazakhstan. Zhem, lying a short distance to the south of Embi, was a former military installation known as Emba-5 (or Embi-5) before it was granted town status.
