= Badamsha =

Badamsha Бадамшы Бадамша
- Location within Kazakhstan
- Coordinates: 49°49′48″N 60°05′55″E
- Country: Kazakhstan
- Region: Aktobe
- Elevation: 419 m (1,375 ft)

Population
  - Total: 5,668
- Time zone: UTC+5 (West Kazakhstan Time)
  - Summer (DST): UTC+5 (West Kazakhstan Time)

Badamsha (Note: Russian: Бадамша, romanized: Badamša) or Badamshy, (Note: Kazakh: Бадамшы, romanized: Badamşy) also known as Batamshinsky, (Note: Russian: Батамшинский, romanized: Batamšinskij) is a town in Aktobe Region, west Kazakhstan. It lies at an altitude of 419 m (1,375 ft). It has a population of 5,668.
