= Mugalzhar District =

Coordinates: 49°09′36″N 58°04′48″E

Mugalzhar
- District
- Мұғалжар ауданы
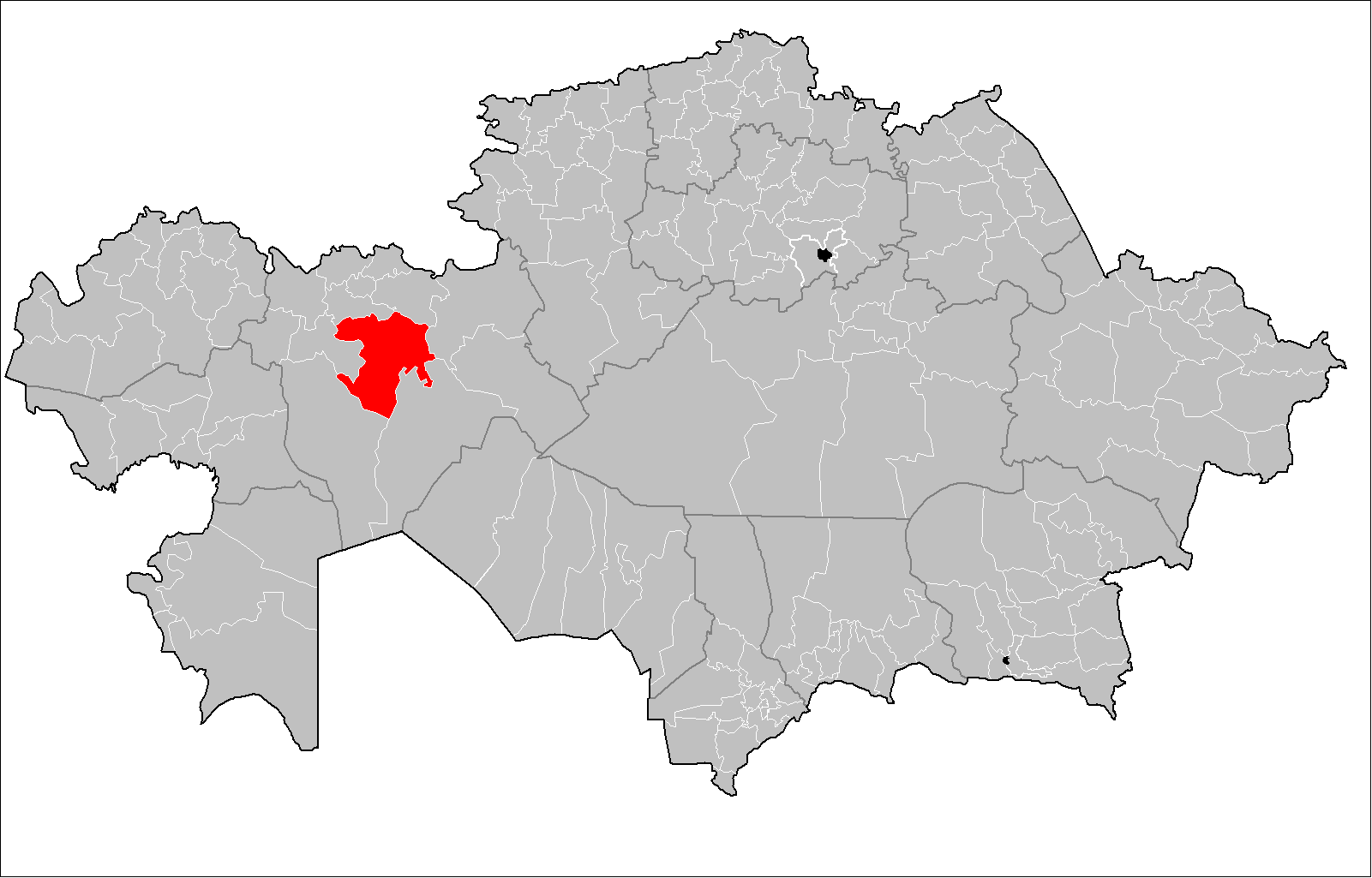
- Country: Kazakhstan
- Region: Aktobe Region
- Administrative center: Kandyagash

Government
  - Akim: Darkhan Ermaganbetov

Population (2013)
  - Total: 64,553
- Time zone: UTC+5 (West)

Mugalzhar (Kazakh: Мұғалжар ауданы, Mūğaljar audany) is a district of Aktobe Region in Kazakhstan. The administrative center of the district is the town of Kandyagash. Two more towns, Embi and Zhem, belong to the district. Population: 64,553 (2013 estimate); 62,115 (2009 census results); 63,812 (1999 census results).

== Geography ==
The Mugalzhar range is located in the district.
