= Alga District =

Coordinates: 49.9088°N 57.3278°E

Alga
- District
- Алға ауданы
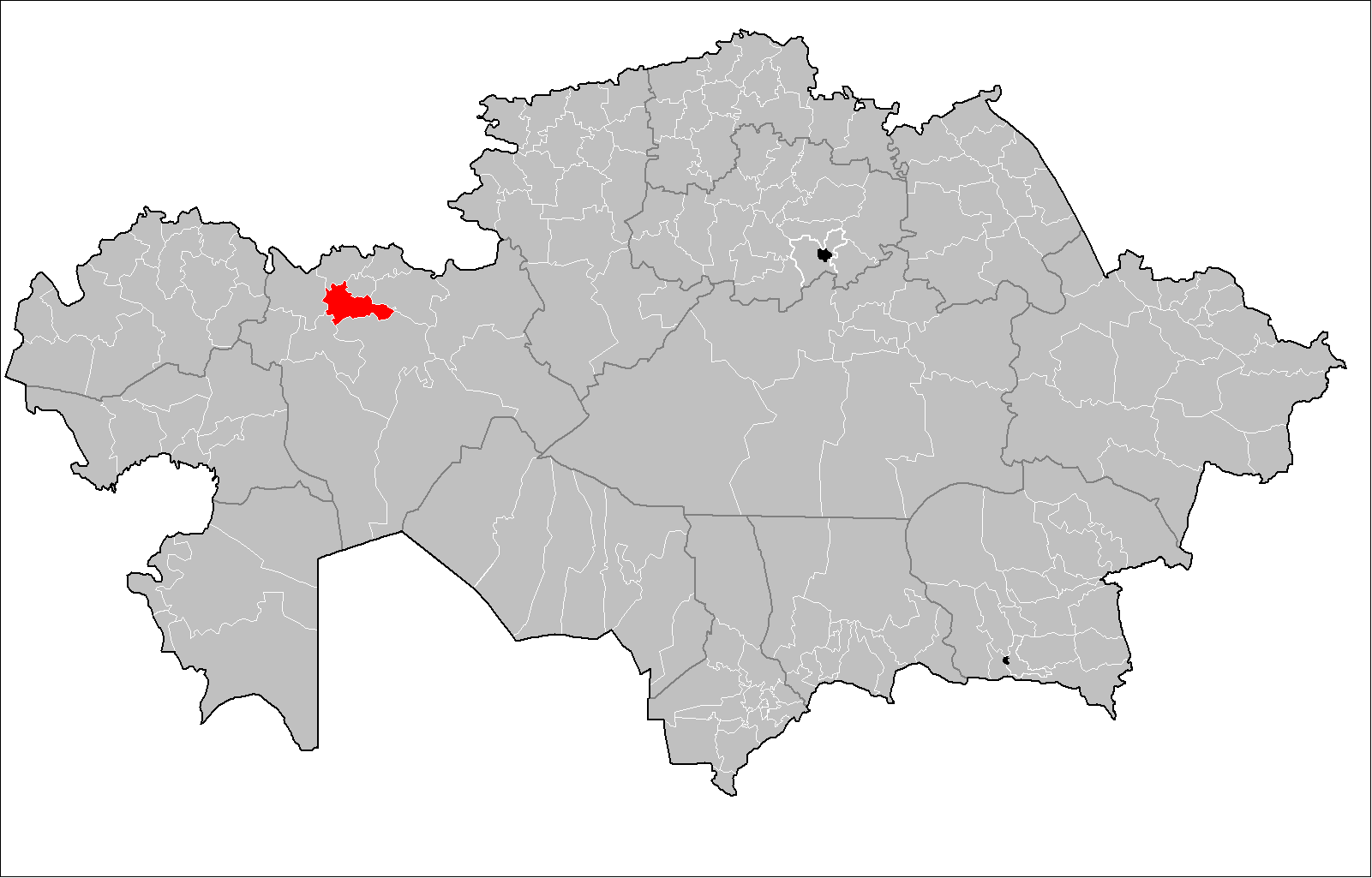
- Country: Kazakhstan
- Region: Aktobe Region
- Administrative center: Alga

Government
  - Akim: Yerzhanov Nurbol Bakhitzhanovich

Population (2013)
  - Total: 38,961
- Time zone: UTC+5 (West)

Alga (Kazakh: Алға ауданы, Alğa audany) is a district of Aktobe Region in Kazakhstan. The administrative center of the district is the town of Alga. Population: 38,961 (2013 estimate); 38,578 (2009 census results); 37,004 (1999 census results).

== History ==
Formed in 1933 as Key district. In 1963 it was renamed into Alginsky district.
