= Aktobe Region =

Region of Kazakhstan

Aktobe Region Aqtöbe oblysy (Kazakh) Актюбинская область (Russian)
- Region
- Ақтөбе облысы
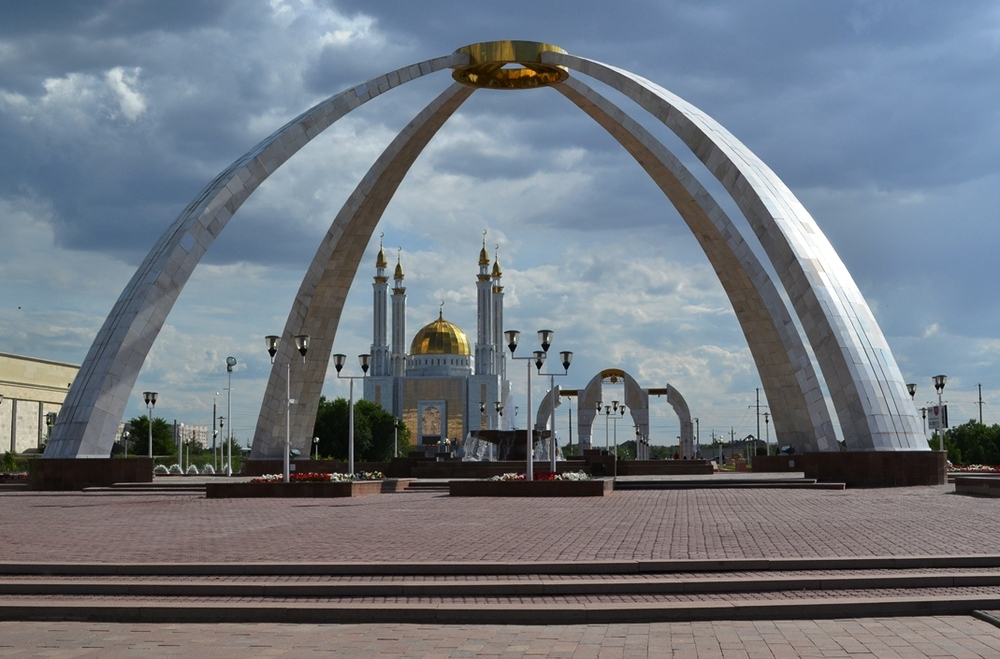
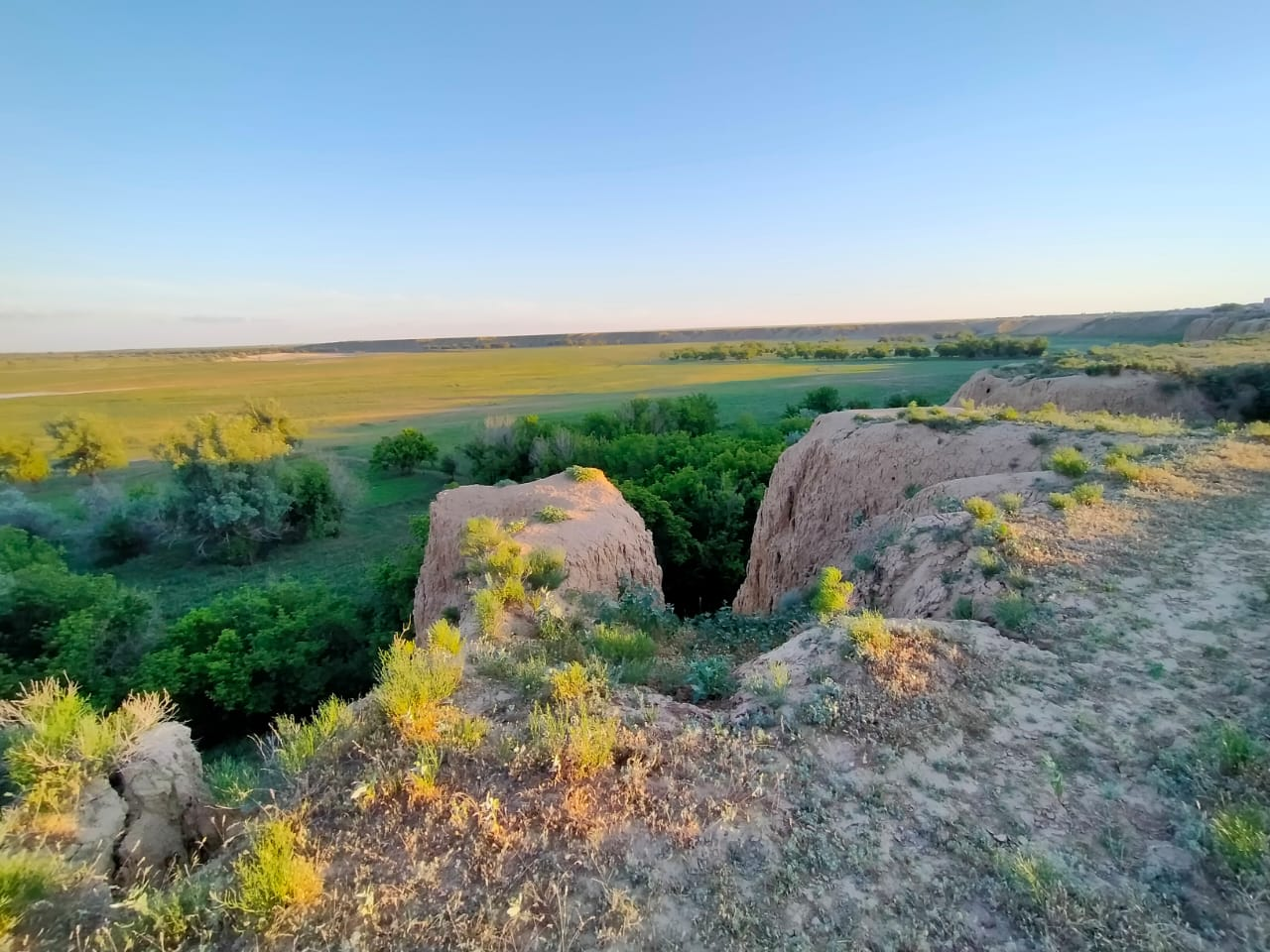
- From the top, Aktolagai Plateau, Aktobe, Oiyl District

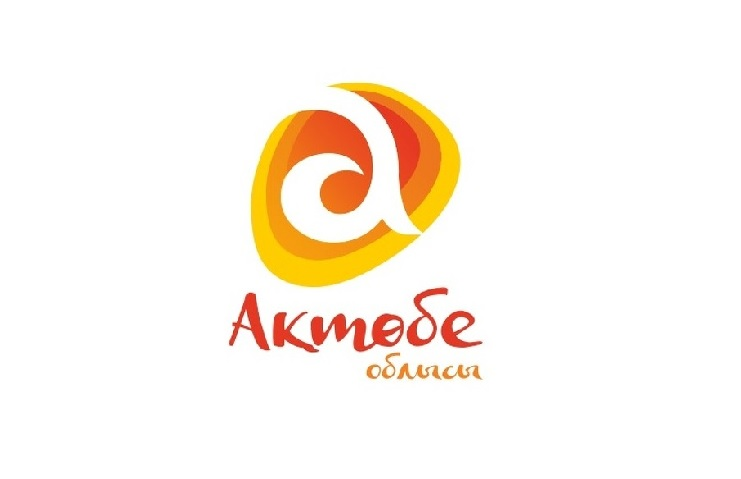
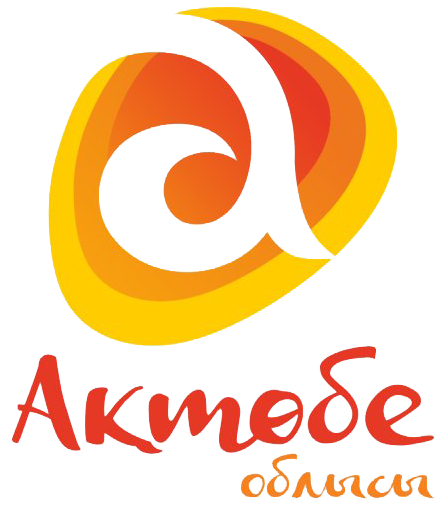
- Flag Coat of arms

- Map of Kazakhstan, location of Aktobe Province highlighted
- Coordinates: 50°17′N 57°10′E
- Country: Kazakhstan
- Capital: Aktobe

Government
  - Body: Regional Mäslihat
  - Äkim: Askhat Shakharov

Area
  - Total: 300,629 km^{2} (116,074 sq mi)

Population (2022-06-01)
  - Total: 909,673
  - Density: 3.02590/km^{2} (7.83704/sq mi)

GDP (Nominal, 2024)
  - Total: KZT 4,976 billion (US$ 10.450 billion) · 8th
  - Per capita: KZT 5,269,000 (US$ 11,065)
- Time zone: UTC+5
  - Summer (DST): UTC+5 (not observed)
- Postal codes: 030000
- Area codes: +7 (713)
- ISO 3166 code: KZ-AKT
- Vehicle registration: 04, D
- Districts: 12
- Cities: 8
- Villages: 441
- HDI (2022): 0.794 high · 4th
- Website: http://aktobe.gov.kz

Aktobe Region (Kazakh: Ақтөбе облысы, romanized: Aqtöbe oblysy; Russian: Актюбинская область) is a region of Kazakhstan. The name Aktobe comes from Kazakh aq 'white' and töbe 'hill'; supposedly, Aktobe's initial settlers were able to see white mountains far to the north. The Aktobe regional capital is the city of Aktobe. The region is located in the western part of Kazakhstan. Its area is 300,629 km^{2} (the largest region in Kazakhstan), which is 11% of the territory of Kazakhstan. As of 1 June, 2022, its population was 909,673.

The region was formed as a result of the administrative–territorial reform on March 10, 1932 as part of the Kazakh Autonomous Soviet Socialist Republic. Historically, it was preceded by the Aktobe gubernia (province), which existed in 1921–1928, and the Aktobe Okrug (district) that existed from 1928 to 1929. In 1936, the region became part of the Kazakh Soviet Socialist Republic (Kazakh SSR), separated from the Russian Soviet Federative Socialist Republic, and since 1991, after the collapse of the Soviet Union, it became part of the independent Republic of Kazakhstan.

Aktobe region is bordered to the north by the Orenburg Oblast of Russia and to the south by the Republic of Karakalpakstan of Uzbekistan, and shares borders with six other Kazakhstan regions. The administrative center is the largest city of Western Kazakhstan, Aktobe (from 1891 to 1999 — Aktyubinsk, hence the name of the region).

== Geography ==
The area of the Aktobe region is 300,600 square kilometers: it was the second largest region of Kazakhstan, after the Karaganda Region, until 2022 when the Karaganda region was split. As of 2025, the Aktobe region remains the largest Kazakhstan region by land area.

The Aktobe region borders Russia (Orenburg Oblast) to the north and Uzbekistan (Karakalpakstan) to the south, and also borders six other Kazakh regions: the Atyrau Region to the west, the Mangystau Region to the south-west, the Karaganda Region to the east, the Kostanay Region to the north-east, the Kyzylorda Region to the south-east, and the West Kazakhstan Region to the north-west.

The Ilek River, a tributary of the Ural River, flows through the region. The Barsuki Desert is an arid, sandy area in the Aktobe and Kyzylorda regions.

== Demographics ==
Historical population
Year	Pop.	±% p.a.
1979	630,383	—
1989	732,653	+1.51%
1999	682,558	−0.71%
2009	757,768	+1.05%
2021	893,669	+1.38%
Source: Citypopulation

=== Ethnic groups ===
Ethnic Group
Ethnic Group	2021	
Ethnic Group	Population	%
Kazakhs	770,569	87.35
Russians	67,462	6.77
Ukrainians	32,251	3.24
Tatars	10,118	1.02
Germans	7,089	0.71
Belarusians	1,788	0.18
Koreans	1,599	0.16
Azeris	1,483	0.15
Chechens	1,442	0.14
Uzbeks	1,332	0.13
Other Ethnicity or Not Stated	11,085	1.11
Total	906,220	100%

=== Religion ===
Religion
Religion	2021	
Religion	Population	%
Islam	760,924	76.38
Christianity	88,968	8.93
No religion	15,298	1.54
Judaism	320	0.03
Buddhism	277	0.03
Other Religion	1,191	0.12
Not Stated	39,242	3.94
Total	906,220	100%

== Administrative divisions ==
The region is administratively divided into twelve districts and the city of Aktobe.

1. Alga District, with the administrative center in the town of Alga;
2. Ayteke Bi District, the selo of Komsomol;
3. Bayganin District, the selo of Karauilkeldy;
4. Kargaly District, the settlement of Badamsha;
5. Khromtau District, the town of Khromtau;
6. Kobda District, the aul of Kobda;
7. Martuk District, the selo of Martuk;
8. Mugalzhar District, the town of Kandyagash;
9. Oiyl District, the selo of Oiyl;
10. Shalkar District, the town of Shalkar;
11. Temir District, the town of Temir;
12. Yrgyz District, the selo of Yrgyz.

^{*} Eight localities in the Aktobe region have town status: these are Aktobe, Alga, Embi, Kandyagash, Khromtau, Shalkar, Temir, and Zhem.
^{*} Two more localities – Shubarkuduk and Shubarshi – have the status of an urban-type settlement.

== Economy ==
Aktobe region is a large industrial region of Kazakhstan. The basis of the industrial sector is the mining and chemical industries, and ferrous metallurgy. Mineral reserves are: natural gas – 144.9 billion m^{3}, oil – 243.6 million tons, and oil and gas condensate – 32.7 million tons. There are large deposits of chromite (1st place in the Commonwealth of Independent States), nickel and cobalt ores, phosphorite, potassium salts, etc.

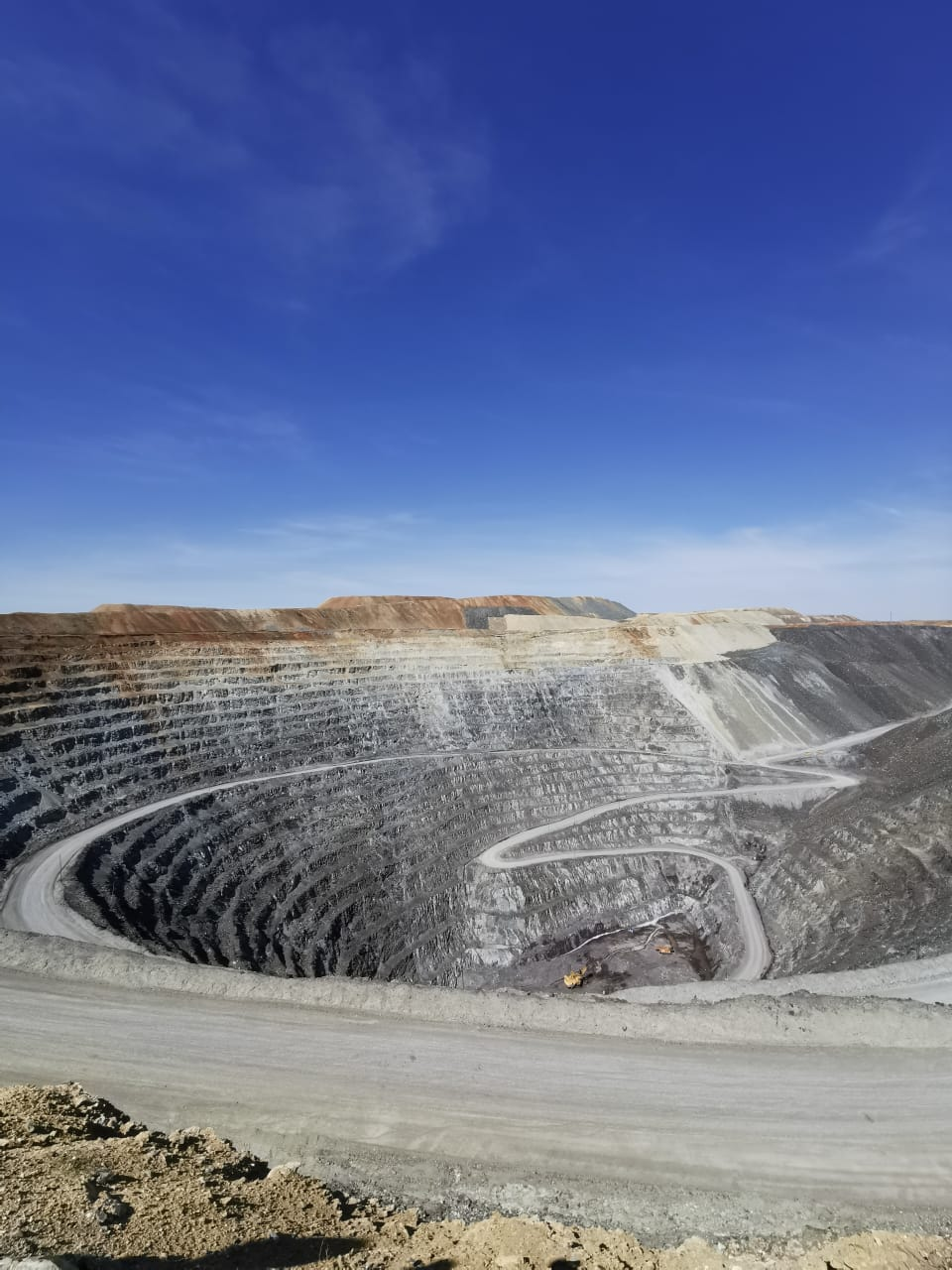
Quarry in Khromtau district

In 2019, the gross regional product (GRP) of the region amounted to 6,841.2 million US dollars, of which industry is 35.2% and agriculture 5.1%. GRP per capita is 7.8 thousand US dollars.

=== Industry ===
The Aktobe region is a large industrially developed region of Kazakhstan. All chrome ore mining, production of chrome salts, roentgen equipment, and more than a quarter of Kazakhstan's ferroalloys are concentrated here. The leading sector of the region's economy is industry. It has a multi-industry structure that includes: mining, oil and gas processing industry, ferrous and non-ferrous metallurgy, mechanical engineering, production of building materials, and chemical, light, and food industries.

In 2019, the manufacturing sector produced products worth 600 billion tenge. In the structure of manufacturing production, the largest share is occupied by:

- Ferroalloy production – 47%
- Production of chromium salts – 14.2%
- Production of rail products – 9.7%

Prospects for the development of this industry are related to the production of high-precision and high-tech products. As of June 1, 2020, there were 1,617 registered enterprises in industrial production, including 645 operating ones.

Large enterprises:

- Enterprise for the extraction of chrome ore and concentrates of «TNK Kazchrom» LLP
- Oil-producing enterprises of «SNPS-Aktobemunay gas», «Kazakhoil Aktobe» LLP
- Plant for the production of chemical compounds of «Aktobe plant of chrome compounds» LLP
- Plant for the production of rail products «Aktobe rail and beam plant» LLP
- Enterprise for the extraction of copper ore and concentrates «Aktobe copper company» LLP
- Enterprise for the extraction of chrome ore and concentrates «Voskhod-Oriel» LLP
- Gold ore mining «AltynEx» Company

=== Agriculture ===
The total area of agricultural land in the Aktobe region, as of January 1, 2020, is 10 672,3 hectares: including pastures – 9434,4 hectares, arable land – 715,8 hectares, hayfields – 133,8 hectares, perennial plantations – 0,6 hectares, vegetable gardens – 0,6 hectares, and other land – 139.2 hectares.

In 2019, gross output of agricultural products (services) in the region as a whole amounted to 275.2 billion tenge, which is 3.7% higher than in the corresponding period of the previous year. Over the past three years, the growth of gross output was 136.6%. The main directions of development of the agro-industrial complex of the region are animal husbandry, while crop production is also developing. In the livestock sector, the gross output in 2019 was 174.7 billion rubles.tenge, while crop production was 99.4 billion tenge.

The growth of agricultural production in 2019 was due to an increase in the volume of slaughtering of livestock and poultry in live weight by 8.5%, milk yield of raw cow's milk by 3.2%, and chicken eggs by 2.6%. As of January 1, 2020, compared to the same date last year, in all categories of farms, the number of horses increased by 12.1% and amounted to 144.3 thousand heads: cattle increased by 6.3% and 493.5 thousand heads; sheep by 1.2% and 981.2 thousand heads; goats by 4.6% and 145.8 thousand heads; poultry by 7.7% and 1310.5 thousand heads; camels by 1.9% and 17.8 thousand heads; and pigs by 1.8% and 58.4 thousand heads.

According to the approved structure of crops in 2020, crops were planned to be sown on an area of 787.0 thousand hectares, including 457.3 thousand hectares of grain and leguminous crops, 35.2 thousand hectares of oilseeds, 282.2 thousand hectares of forage crops, 6.3 thousand hectares of potatoes, and 5.9 thousand hectares of vegetable and melon crops.

To further increase the gross agricultural output, the "program for the development of the agro-industrial complex of the Aktobe region for 2020-2025" was developed. In accordance with this program, it is planned to increase labor productivity in the agro-industrial complex and export of processed agricultural products by at least 2.5 times over 5 years compared to 2017. At the same time, by 2025, it is planned to increase the volume of gross output in the region to 444.5 billion rubles.tenge, including 289.0 billion in livestock production, and 155.5 billion in crop production.

=== Transportation ===
The length of public roads in the Aktobe region is 6,856. 6 km, including 1,894 km of national, 1,262. 8 km of regional and 3,699. 8 km of district significance. To date, the share of roads in good and satisfactory condition of national significance is 56.5% or 1,061 km, and local significance is 56.5% or 2,829. 3 km. The regional highways of national significance include: «Samara-Shymkent», «Aktobe-Kandyagash-Emba-Shalkar», «Aktobe-Martuk», «Aktobe-Orsk», «Aktobe-Atyrau-border of the Russian Federation (to Astrakhan)». There are highways of regional significance «Kobda-Martuk», «Pokrovka-Temir-Kenkiyak-Emba», «Shubarkuduk-Uil-Kobda-Sol-Iletsk», «Aktobe-Orsk»-«Badamsha-Don», «Aktobe-Rodnikovka-Martuk», «Shalkar-Bozoy-border RU (on Nukus)», «Aktobe-Bolgarka-Shubarkuduk», «Aktobe-Orsk», and «Petropavlovsk-Khazretovka».

In the region, passengers and luggage are transported by 20 carriers with private ownership. There are 80 routes, including 52 urban, 17 intra-regional, 5 inter-regional, and 6 international routes that connect the region's settlements with the cities of Russia-Orsk, Orenburg, Samara, Novotroitsk, Kazan, and St. Petersburg.

There is 1 bus station in the city of Aktobe, 2 bus stations in the city of Aktobe, Khromtau, and 1 passenger service point in the village of Komsomol. In other regional centers, there are cash points for the sale of travel documents. 2 carriers carry out regular urban passenger transportation in the regional center of Aktobe: «vehicle fleet» LLP and «PMTP» LLP. 52 routes are served and more than 400 large, medium, and small-capacity buses are used.

== Social sphere ==
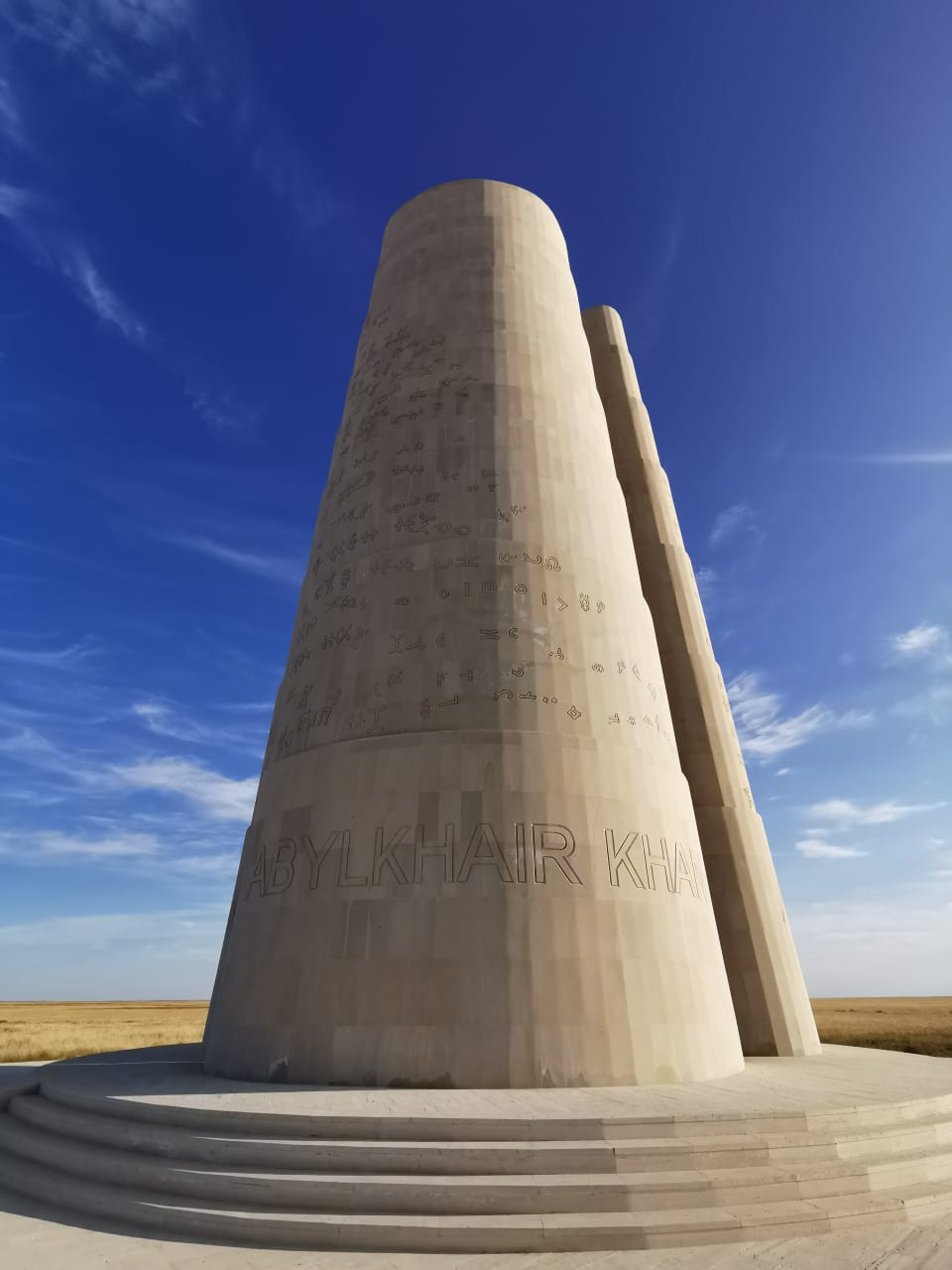
«Khan Molasy» Memorial complex

=== Culture ===
In Aktobe region currently, there are four regional libraries, one folk art center, one philharmonic hall, two theaters, 19 museums, 13 archives, one planetarium and one center for patriotic education.

The regional philharmonic, named after G. Zhubanova, has 10 creative groups. Creative teams take part in many national and international competitions and festivals, widely promote the art of the Kazakh people, take prizes, and make major contribution to the development of the region.

The regional center of folk art organizes and conducts cultural events of various directions. The center works to coordinate, promote and distribute folk art, and coordinate the activities of culture and leisure institutions in the region. There are creative teams that have 156 «folk» and «exemplary» titles.

New productions are prepared on the theater stages every year. The theater covers more than 60 thousand spectators annually, and the theater's repertoire is replenished with about 10 new productions. Creative achievements of the theater team have been repeatedly noted in various directing and acting fields.

Regional libraries, museums, and archives are annually replenished with new funds. In order to activate the industry, funds are being digitized. In addition, the region has the country's first stationary planetarium. Since 2008, Aktobe planetarium has become a member of the Association of Cooperation, which includes about 100 Russian and Eurasian planetariums.

In the village of Aliya, Kobda district of the Aktobe region, there is a regional center for patriotic education, «Aliya». The center has all conditions for holding cultural and sports events, and recreation for young people. The center works in close contact with war and labor veterans, and museums in the regions of Moscow, St. Petersburg, Pskov, and Ural.

=== Sport ===
There are 31 children's and youth sport schools in the Aktobe region which include: 14 regional children's and youth sport schools; the school of higher sport skills; the Olympic reserve center; 4 city and 12 district of youth sport schools; and one children's and youth sport school based on the Aktobe Ferroalloy plant, where about 19 thousand children and teenagers are engaged.

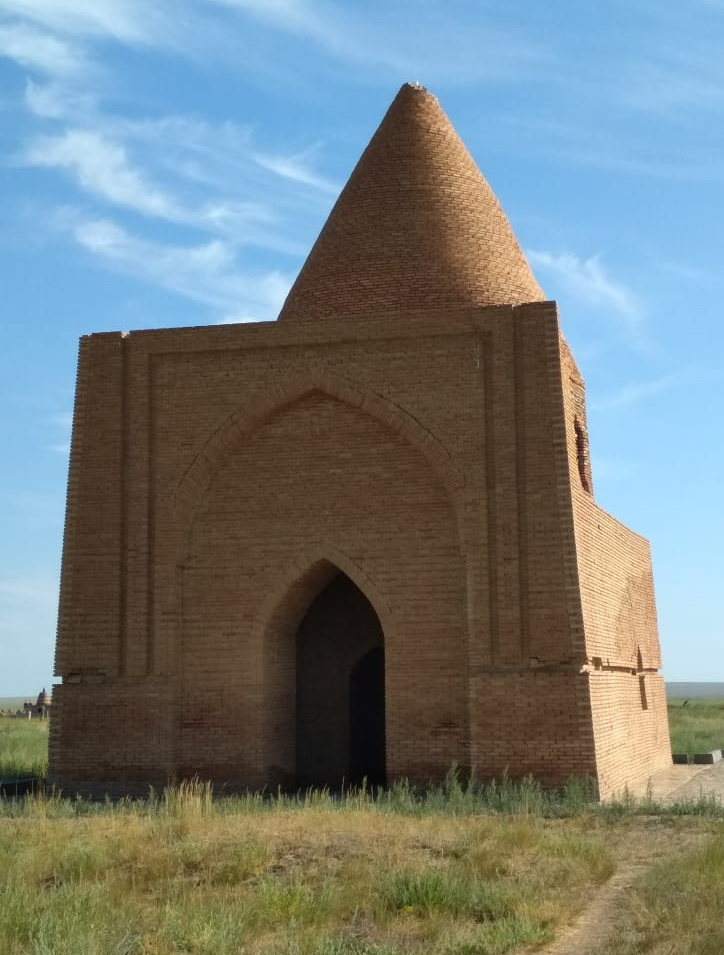
«Abat-Baytak» memorial complex

In 2016, a specialized boarding school–college (SBSG) of the Eset Batyr Olympic reserve was opened in Aktobe. In SHIK sport, athletes study and train in 9 sports: boxing, football, Greco-Roman wrestling, table tennis, athletics, taekwondo, freestyle wrestling, judo, and skiing.

The regional center has a club for people with disabilities, and the national teams of the Republic of Kazakhstan from the region include 38 people with disabilities.

86 sports are cultivated in the region, including 33 Olympic, 38 non-Olympic, 7 technical, and 8 national sports, including 22 sports among athletes with disabilities.

The city is home to the famous football club FC «Aktobe» which dates back to 1967, when the team «Aktyubinets» was awarded the status of a team of masters. The 2008 season turned out to be a Golden season for the team, so Aktobe became the only club in the history of Kazakhstan football that managed to win all three honorary titles — the Cup, super Cup, and gold medals of the national championship. Aktobe region is proud of its sport history and its traditions.

Champions of various sports from the region include:

G. Jafarov (boxing), Shakharov A., Kusherbayeva G., Utarbayev S., Ibraev R., Kuanov E., Baylieva R. (sambo, judo), F. Harki (weightlifting), Ainagulov M., Sisenbayev A., Zhalgasov D., Asembayev T., Izimgali S. (Greco-Roman wrestling), Sagandykov R., Aktauov A, Azhikanov N., Bolat M., Muratov A. (karate-do), Goncharov E. (kettlebell lifting), A. Tarabrin, Kamzenov A., Nazarova D., Khudyakov V. (swimming), Zhanibekova O., Sanaev N., Batyrmurzaev Yu. (freestyle wrestling), Kisykov B., Sergazin A., Yerzhanov Sh., Sagynbaev A. (national sports) Deleuran B. (skiing), Sh. Zhuldaspayev, G. Kurmanbayeva, Kholostenko M., Tineev K., Esengosuly M., Malaydar B. (athletes with disabilities), Petukhov A., Amanzhol H., Zhakeev M., Kineeva D. (intellectual sports), Zhumagulov Zh., S. Morozov, G. Dazaev (MMA), and many others.

In recent years, the Aktobe region has been actively building and commissioning sport facilities, which is attractive for large-scale sport events.

- In 2017, the sports complex «Zhekpe-Zhek» was built for 730 seats. In order to develop winter sports, the hockey module of the youth sport school No. 5 «Olymp» was built for 200 seats.
- In 2018, the construction of an Ice complex with 2,500 seats was completed.
- A tennis center with 114-seat hotel rooms has been put into operation. It consists of 4 indoor and 4 outdoor courts that meet international standards.
- A roller ski track and a Triathlon Park with a 2.5 km bike and running track are also under construction.

At the national Winter Spartakiad 2013, the regional bandy team became the champion.

=== Tourism ===
Today in the Aktobe region, there are 75 sacred objects, including 27 objects of national and 48 of local significance. The most popular among them are sacred objects of national significance: the «Eset Batyr» mausoleum complex, the «Kobylandy Batyr» memorial complex, the «Abat Baitak» mausoleum, the «Khan molasy» necropolis, the «Keruen Saray» complex, and the «Kotibar Batyr Basenuly» mausoleum.

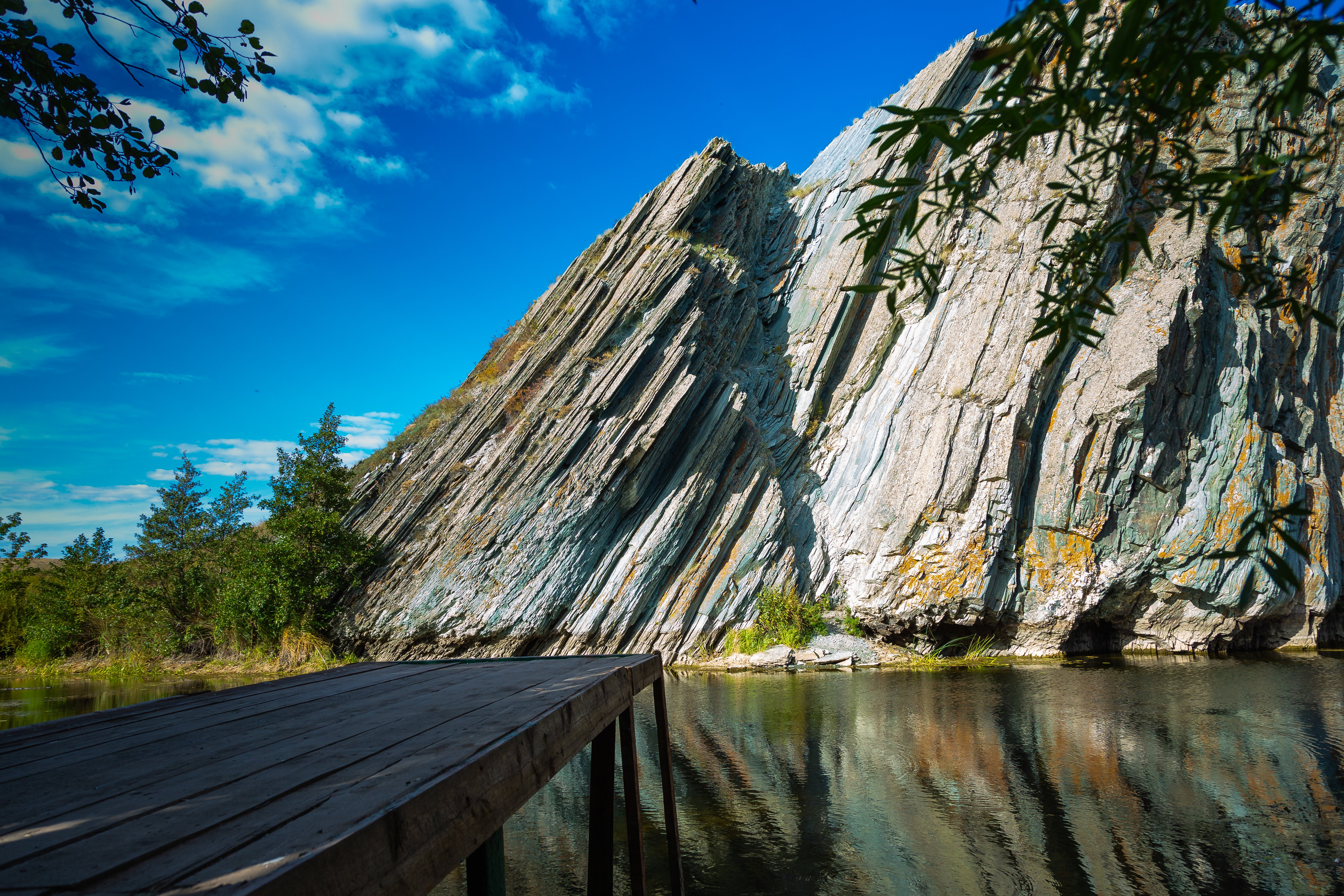
"Voiceless" village (Kargaly district)

Currently, in addition to visiting sacred, cultural, and historical sites, the following types of tourism are popular in the Aktobe region:

- Ecological tourism: Kargaly reservoir (sturgeon ponds, Aschelisay(«wolf») waterfall), chalk mountains «Aktolagay» (Baiganin district), and Irgiz-Turgay Nature Reserve (Irgiz district).
- Therapeutic–sanative (medical) tourism: the sanatorium-pantoleonta «Zaru» (Martuk district), sanatorium dispensary «Shipager» (Alga district), and sands «Barkyn (Uil district).
- Entertainment tourism: aqua park «Tree of life Aktobe», recreation and entertainment park «Green land», and recreation park «Yurta park».

There is also a tourist portal dedicated to the region, and tourist information desks are installed at the airport and on the Arbat in Aktobe.

On August 24, 2019 the first international tourist festival, «Qarg'aly Fest», was held. The number of participants was more than 4,000 people.

== See also ==
- Aral Sea
- Mugodzhar Hills
- Southern Ural Mountains
