= Abdizhamil Nurpeisov =

Kazakh writer and translator (1924–2022)

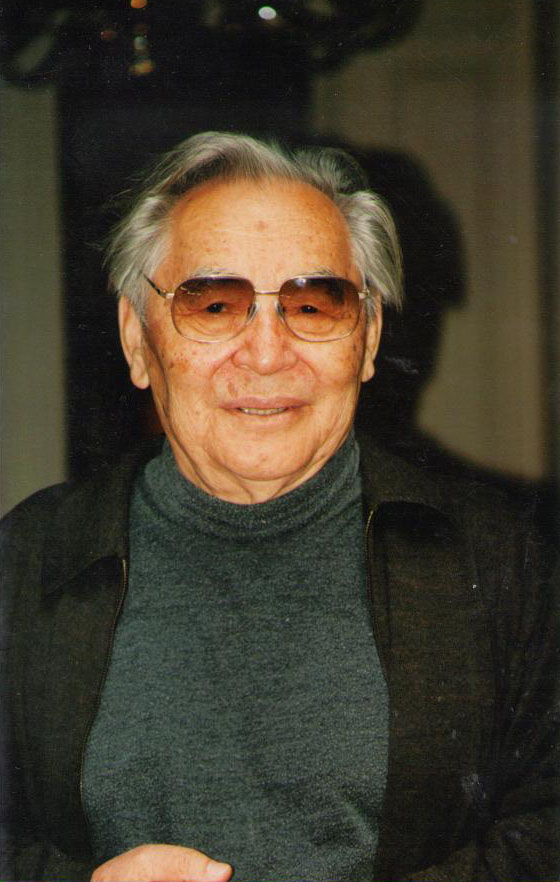
- Born: Abdizhamil Karimuly Nurpeisov; 22 October 1924; Kulandy, Kazalinsky Uyezd, Syr-Darya Oblast, Kirghiz ASSR, RSFSR, Soviet Union
- Died: 5 February 2022 (aged 97); Almaty, Kazakhstan
- Occupation: Writer
- Writing career
- Genre: Novel
- Notable works: The Blood and Sweat

Abdizhamil Karimuly Nurpeisov (Kazakh: Әбдіжәміл Кәрімұлы Нұрпейісов, Äbdıjämıl Kärımūly Nūrpeiısov; 22 October 1924 – 5 February 2022) was a Soviet and Kazakh writer and translator.

== Life ==
=== Origin ===
His ancestors anciently lived in the area of the Aral Sea. His grandfather in the seventh generation Taykozha Batyr had a son Kaldan; in his turn he had a son Arghynbay Bi, who had a son Sylanbay famous in his time for untold wealth. Nurpeis born after him was a district hakim. Nurpeis had three sons Karim, Nazhim and Kali. All the three and Abdizhamil born of Karim participated in the Great Patriotic War (1941–1945). Among them all Abdizhamil was the only one returned alive from the front. His father Karim was engaged in hunting and worked in the village Soviet. Just before the war he worked at a fishery collective farm. In 1944, on April 21 he died in the war thereabouts Ternopol.

=== Career ===
In 1942, after leaving a secondary school, he joined the Army and participated in the Great Patriotic War. After graduating from the preliminary courses he became a political worker at the South and the Baltic fronts, in an artillery mortar company thereabouts Luhansk, later he was a staff officer and saw action in the Baltic at the Kurland bridgehead.

In December 1946, demobilized from the army Abdizhamil entered upon writing the novel "Kurland", which he started being in the army. After completion and publishing the novel, he had been studying for a year in the Kazakh State University.

In 1954 he entered Gorky Literary Institute in Moscow and graduated from it in 1956. For his first book he was given the Zhambyl Republican Award. Along with the fact that he worked continuously in the field of prose, he stood out with his keen criticism, and journalistic articles. In 1962–1964 he worked as a head editor of the magazine Zhuldyz, which was the body of the Writers' Union of Kazakhstan, besides that he was a delegate of the Supreme Soviet of the Kazakh SSR.

Since 1964, for many years he had been engaged in creative activities only, during the market time he organized an international Kazakh PEN Club and was appointed to its presidency. In 2000, he started publishing the magazine "Tan Sholpan" under the auspices of the PEN club. For many years he had been a chairman of the board of editors of one and the same literary and social magazine.

Abidzhamil Nurpeisov’s The Blood and Sweat trilogy and his other writings the other writings made significant contributions to twentieth-century Kazakh literature. His writings were translated into about thirty foreign languages, this has helped introduce the world about the national Kazakh literature. His work was praised by some of the world's most outstanding writers. A Frenchman Louis Aragon, Russians Yury Kazakov, Sergei Baruzdin, Anatoli Kim, Nikolay Afanasiev, Lev Anninsky, Leonid Terakopyan, Valentin Oskotsky, a Spaniard August Vidal, a Kyrgyz Chingiz Aitmatov, a Bashkir Mustai Karim, Germans Leo Kossuth, Ralph Schroeder, Kazakhstanis Mukhtar Auezov, Sabit Mukanov, Gabit Musirepov, Mukhamedzhan Karataev, Takhauy Ahtanov, Serik Kirabaev, Zeynolla Kabdolov, Gerold Belger, Akseleu Seydimbek, and the others wrote about him with excitement.

"... Everything written by Abdizhamil can be called as an entire epic. The epic could be also called "The twentieth century and the Kazakh world". Ordeals in the beginning of the century (The Blood and Sweat), inhumanity in its middle ("Kurland"), and persecution at the end of the century ("The last duty") constitute a single artistic canvas."

The trilogy The Blood and Sweat, and the dilogy "The Last Duty" are not only Nurpeisov's successes, but also a success of all Kazakh literature. The outstanding writer was praised for his extraordinary work by the people and by the State.

A. Nurpeisov was the laureate of the USSR State Prize. In Kazakhstan only three writers Mukhtar Auezov, Abdizhamil Nurpeisov, Zhuban Moldagaliev have such an award.

=== Personal life and death ===
He died on 5 February 2022, at the age of 97.

== Awards ==
Order of the second degree of the Second World War, "Red Star";

Order of the "Red Banner of Labor";

Order "Mark of Honor";

Kazakhstan Order "Homeland";

In 1985 he was given the honorary title "People's Writer of the Kazakh Soviet Socialist Republic".

USSR State Prize

People's Writer of the Kazakh SSR. For his active participation in the printing of the World 200 volume library also for writing the preface to Mukhtar Auezov's two-volume of the same library the certificate of honour of the Supreme Soviet of the RSFSR.

== Literature ==
=== Oeuvre ===
Abdizhamil started his literary way with a novel, his favorite genre. A soldier, who just was back from World War II, took a pen into hands and under the pressure of the flushing inspiration presented on the paper the impressions received in a bloody battle, in the struggle between life and death. The impressions were so great that on returning from the army, working tirelessly for four to five years, gave birth to the extensional novel "Kurland" (1950). Although the artistry was not at the quite proper level, this work was included into the literature because of its wealth of ideas and new images. A Kazakh reader could find out all the truth of the trench life, the depth and breath of warrior's life, could see directly the military frontier. "Kurland" afterwards was complemented and reduced, published again under the title "The long-awaited day" (1958).

The writing has been edited in order to improve the artistic quality of the work. Some people suppose "Kurland" to be "bad and beneath criticism". The author seemed to agree with the critics: "... In 1947, being back from the front I wrote the novel in a half-literate state. Of course it's known a half-literate writer will write a half-literate novel." Takhauy Ahtanov noticed that the novelist is a critic himself. In the novel "Kurland", he wrote, a young writer first of all showed his talent and skills of the word-painter. He could show life of the war to the reader in the artistic way.

He created characters that reflected the appearance, personality, and internal perspective of contemporaries. The writer demonstrated knowledge of the Kazakh language and used it within the work.

=== The Blood and Sweat ===
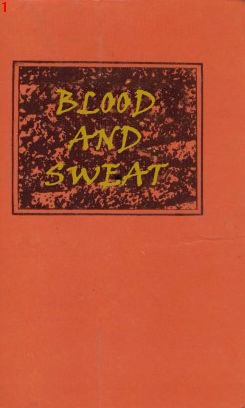
The Blood and Sweat book cover

The young officer Abdizhamil returned from the front as warmly met his native land, as much he desired to sing from the depth of his heart of love to his Motherland on the pages of the novel. It is clearly seen in his writing.

"... Until now, the soul belongs to rural life. It doesn't matter how far you are from your native land, you always will be related with your motherland. Some days you remember a lonely home of an old fisherman, your poor abode, the lamp flashing inside. Though you have a better house, you miss badly your ancestral, smelling of fish home. Your father, probably tired of his work is inside. His shiny dark face burnt by the sun is full of its own beauty. And his voice is barely audible. His wrinkled face covers with rays of joy if all of a sudden a swarthy pug boy runs into the house, "- says the writer.

These words of the writer explain why the novel The Blood and Sweat was written. The trilogy The Blood and Sweat consists of the novels Twilight (1961), Ordeals (1964), Crash (1970). As it follows from the titles there are not much sweets of life in the novels. If the characters have some, then they fall into another hell. The protagonist of the trilogy Elaman is always gloomy. But the sense of love for his native land always takes a special place in his heart.

The writer's love to his people, to vast steppes can be seen in his long story stretching endlessly as endless motions across the steppes, in songs, in good-natured characters, described on the epic level.

The trilogy The Blood and Sweat is written about the people and the country, about his social destiny. Even if great changes take place in the present life this writing is epoch-making. Some neo-nihilists try to name the gold literature of the seventieth as a copper one; they suppose the novel to be obsolete because it describes the social struggle.

If one reads the trilogy The Blood and Sweat from the present independent and democratic point of view he wouldn't find a word conflicting with the reality of the past Kazakh life. On the contrary there are thoughts and ideas contradicting the communist ideology views and there is a reason to ask "how the vigilant censorship allowed them to be".

In the last book of the novel Crash, Elaman has some doubts if the principles of the future communist society agitated by Commissioner Diakov are faithful.

"Well, we will defeat the enemies, everything will become as we wish, and our life will change to the best, and all people will be equal, but will they be able to curb the insatiable desires, their greed? Is it possible? More than once in his life he had to break unbridled horses. The most stubborn, restive horse being under the iron twisters used to become silky in a day or two. Moreover, it predicted and fulfilled the slightest desire of the rider and obediently followed him. And what will we do with an obstinate capricious man? Should he be bridled like a horse? A? What do you Say?

No, I don't understand that. While there is human's greed some of these tomboys in the future will be respected, some will be at the door. "

In comparison with the first work of the novelist The Blood and Sweat broadly covers life of that period and its genre is quite different from the other writings. If "Kurland" is a narrative novel, The Blood and Sweat is a writing of the social and psychological type. The emphasis is put upon the character. The entire writer's creativity was used to disclose the ancestors' nature. Personal identity of the characters is the driving-force of the Nurpeisov's novel. The character created by the people, in its turn, affects the national heart rate, the tone and mood of the people. It seems to be the cause of the events in the novel. Besides of that it is the focus of the plot.

Elaman's personality consists of the unity of his general and specific personal features. Throughout the narration his character is complemented and enriched by nature. In the initial book of the trilogy Twilight Elaman is an ordinary fisherman. His main innate characteristics are impetuosity and firmness. From the very beginning is clear that he is class conscious and educated. His disadvantage is it is no matter to him what happens in the outside world. The writer thus gradually lets the social beam into shady characters of the patriarchal circumstances.

An accidental event brought Elaman to a social shock. Fedorov, the owner of the Aral industrial settlement called by people as "bully Shodyr" forced the fishermen to go to the not yet frozen sea. While the hired fishermen were being beaten Elaman was internally indignant but when they wanted to beat him too, he raised a crowbar in his hand and killed his moneymaker... It was a random event. Elaman had never thought to kill a man. He has been a quiet, kind man by nature. There is a reason to believe this accident to be a must. The death of innocent fishermen Andrew and Zhalmurat, evaluation of merchant's assets above their life, lack of humanity fired up the fire of revenge in his chest.

To create the character Nurpeisov uses social and psychological methods of analysis. From the very beginning of the novel the author makes Elaman's soul to speak through the inner monologue. Besides of that he often uses monologues to make a psychological self-analysis. Loneliness is the condition for monologues to appear. Elaman concludes: "It's common for a lone person to think." His thoughts constantly bifurcate.

"But in the evenings he felt bad. He looked into his wife's eyes and saw her alienation. And as fish in the sea came and went away, he knew when they came and went, but he didn't know why, the same was with his wife: he saw something was happening in her eyes and face, but didn't know what it was, and the only thing he knew for sure that was not him, not his life was living in the depths of her soul.

By force of habit they turned away from each other. Elaman closed his eyes, but he didn't fall asleep, and began to think about death, fish, his future child, about Fedorov and Tanirbergen... Akbala was not moving; her breath was deep and monotonous. "Is she sleeping?—Elaman thought and decided: Probably she is asleep!"

The hero is upset internally, worried and is sorry. The writer always thrills to such inner dramas of a man.

In the second book of the trilogy Ordeals Elaman's personal unhappiness exceeds miseries of the people. The book is about his joining the people. The splash of social contradictions in the Kazakh steppe is shown from its depth

After the Tsar's dethronement the Provisional Government came instead. It couldn't control the people. It is the time of the double government. The people are in crisis, hardships of the war are everywhere. Elaman after imprisoning, persecutions, working on the railways, after participating in the war with the Turks, on his return from the war to Shalkar, understands a lot and is more class conscious. But the "explosion" of the hero hasn't happened yet. He doesn't distinguish fully the left and the right, he's in ordeal.

The plot and the composition of the second book flow out of the mentioned features of the main character. The story is started with the description the state of excitement appearing before social storms, quite similar to the stormy sea. There is not its former tranquility any more. The composition consists of the interrelated events of the plot. When a great event is in the past, the content of the affected plot is replaced by journalism. The events described lead to appearance of the new thoughts. The inner dramatic and complicated psychological state of the epic story changes and gets the shade of logical argumentation.

"Then Elaman was going to Shalkar. He hasn't decided yet whether he would stay there. The work at the train shed was not clear to him; he even felt some qualms when thinking of it. And more of that he missed his home, ordinary routines, a familiar work, the fishermen's village on the hill..."

The above sentence was not included into the latest edition of the novel as if the author considered it unnecessary to explain the details of a quite understandable circumstance. Elaman was as a stun fish, though his desire to get to Shalkar is conscious. He has been to many places. On his way to Shalkar Elaman wasn't thinking of himself, he knew exactly how he could help the people.

The storyline of the character is expanding. Proud-hearted Elaman returned home from the war; he should not bow to anyone and doesn't miss good opportunities. In fact it is so. At the front in the struggle against Russian Cossacks he saved Myulgauzen and brought him to his own apartment, helped him to get a job in Shalkar, and then he fought with him because Myulgauzen called Elaman a "coward" before all people in the village. Firmness of Elaman's character can be seen when unexpectedly meeting Akbala, who could not return to her family after their divorce. In the old version of the novel Elaman was sorry for his wife and wanted to make it up with her again. In the new version, he doesn't want to live with Akbala. And finally she left both Elaman and their baby.

After the fight with Myulgauzen Elaman returned into the village and was as quiet as before. He seemed to be drifting. On his way home he hid the gun brought from Shalkar. He seemed to be looking for a quiet life among the fishermen. If possible he spent some time with his child who was at Suyeu's, his fathers-in-law. But his private life didn't continue long. Life pulled him into its vortex. He had to turn up his sleeves. He had no choice as to take part in the social struggle. He stood up against violence on the side of a merchant Temirkebai and Tanirbergen Bai who were the owners of the local sea shores and allowed to no one to fish. They knew that would lose, but tried to show their strength. When Turkmens attacked and stole the villagers' cattle, they took revenge for the enemies and returned the animals back. The situation affected the honor, produced energy and the energy perfected his character. The character was filled with energy, which could turn the situation to the desired direction. Social consciousness of the former horseman, fisherman and soldier has expanded. Elaman who had killed Shodyr had been a victim of a natural rebellion. Now Elaman has become an absolutely different person. He is a class conscious fighter. A fierce weapon is in the hands of the people. Bur it is not only physical strength, this is a clever weapon.

After the funeral of the victims of the Turkmen, when was alone on the hill Elaman fell in heavy thoughts. He wasn't just sad he was in heavy thoughts. The long story describing his life finds its completion.

"Yes, but why are the Kazakhs submissive so much? One can suffer of hunger, poverty, but is it possible to tolerate slavery? Whether carelessness is eternal scourge of the Kazakhs? Were there any people, who for the honor of the people called for unification in anxious Time?

Many times he asked the elderly, who witnessed the past. But no matter how long their life was they have learned no lesson. As their forefathers they have seen nothing good and sensible and began to praise some hoary antiquity, ancient boastful warriors, fabulously wealthy and crafty beys known from the songs. And to the young asking them for advice they predicted a bleak Fate.

He was satisfied with not a single matter of his ancestors. A rare people took vast lands, but what did they benefit? They possessed broad land, but whether they had as wide thoughts and deeds? Litigations and disputes about owning the lands for many centuries undermined the forces and generated civil discord and now the nation is despised and oppressed by all those who are not lazy."

A nonfiction chanting is like a dramatic story. Troublous Elaman is looking for the ways out of the impasse. Seeking a way out, his thoughts are everywhere, he remembers a lot. His viewpoint when returning to the village appears to be interesting. Peering into a spacious steppe he is thinking of something else. In his thoughts he's on the Russian lands and at the front of Turkey. Wandering thoughts lead him to great ideas. The chanting and reminiscences turn into long internal monologue. Elaman changes entirely. Elaman's consciousness awakened, he has been enriched spiritually and has grown. Alike the sea surface the expanses of the novel increase.

Not all Elaman's thoughts about the fate of the people are immaculate. One can agree with them or not. It is not correct to criticize the past of the Kazakh people fully. Some of ideas in the novel are influenced by the dominant point of view during the Soviet period the so-called socialist realism. Alongside one can't agree with the belittling of the people's history. Elaman's thoughts about unity among the people are to be agreed. They take a special place in the novel.

First, they affect the historical truth. Second, they have epochal value. They affect the issue of the unity of the Kazakh people, which has been the most important since time immemorial. They match with the national idea. Elaman thinks a lot about land disputes. And it is another ancient fault.

As we can see, the internal monologue of the main character changes from introspection to greater problems to the state of the people. Elaman reinvents everything and passes it through his heart. At the end of the trilogy Elaman is a matured person, he saw a lot in his life. His thoughts about society have specifics, its own philosophy. The ideological and spiritual evolution of the hero his transformation reaches its peak. In this part of the narration his inner monologue turns into the inner dialogue and then into a monologue-discussion. Before he died by the sword of young Fedorov Elaman's monologue had taken a different character. This can be called a monologue- behest, monologue-dream.

In the writing The Blood and Sweat except Elaman there are other characters whose big or small plot lines that intersect. One of them is Tanirbergen. He is a villain who neither modern nor from the class point of view, represents nothing good. Akbala and Tanirbergen's Son is called Kudaibergen. Having heard of that Suyeu, a querulous old man, describes Tanirbergen's rich ancestors." – Is he named Kudaibergen? A? They call this puppy Kudaibergen! His father is Tanirbergen! And ... and those ones, all the rest... Aldabergen... Zhasanganbergen... Kudaymende...—He pulled the neckband and began to choke.—Hey! Hey, what's this! A? What does it mean? Does it mean that Abraly's kids are given by God? Allah ... Allah ... The Creator? And who gave us our children then? A? Who, I ask you! "

And even now, reading the trilogy one can notice that author buried Tanirbergen not for his wealth. The character is exposed not only due to the class position, but also from the position of humanity. His life is given to him by God. And what about his cattle? One can't say that it is given by God, as he uses the labor of other people. Besides he catches the thieves. Several times he rustled Turkmen horses and "kindled the fire" between the two neighboring villages. He is also blame for the fact that the Turkmen attack Kazakh villages.

Tanirbergen speaks a lot about the unity of the people; he likes to honour purity and justice. In fact, he is the promoter of discord among the people. He divided a quiet fishermen's settlement into two, made mischief between them.

In addition he is exhausted in his everyday life. The damage he caused to Akbala, vowing his love for her, the fact that he took it from her child complements his cruel image. He seems to forget that he had a wife Akba. Tanirbergen is surprised himself because of such a cruelty. Even crocodile's eyes water when it swallows its prey. As for Tanirbergen, he is satisfied with his callousness himself. He sometimes seems to be proud of his character.

If Elaman cleared internally in contrast to Tanirbergen sinks in the mud. There wasn't a character in the Kazakh literature that would be proud of his own filth. Kunanbay is also tough, but not as much as Tanirbergen.

Critics of The Blood and Sweat compare its characters to the characters of the Mikhail Sholokhov's epics "Quiet Flows the Don". Some even believe that some of them were copied from there. There are over two hundred characters in the trilogy of the Kazakh writer, and not one of them, even the Russian ones look like the characters of other writings. If we take for example Tanirbergen, the "hero" of this type has no similar characters in the novel of the Great Russian writer. Tanirbergen is a single one, which was added to the gallery of the world literature by the Kazakh literature.

The Trilogy The Blood and Sweat is concluded with a large chapter describing the last days of Tanirbergen's destiny. "As soon as the Whites were going to draw in from the Aral Sea, Tanirbergen fell into the opposite state of the spirit." The chapter started with the above sentence thus consists entirely of his internal monologue. Crafty and cunning he always got everything he wished. Now, whatever he thought is the opposite. He is not pleased with his property. His interior monologue is like a whirlwind.

The cruel time does not allow him to lie quietly in his bed, it blows him to Shalkar. He was caught there. The retreating Chernoff's soldiers needed a man who could bring them through the sands, and his treacherous friend Temirke pointed to Tanirbergen. First he thought it would be enough to show the way to Altykudyk, then they would do somehow. But he was mistaken. He had to bring them to Ulykum and Kishikum. He led them safely, but this time he failed. The Wtites were angry with him because the lack of water. "Well, you bastard! Where is the well? "- the officer pulled him.

Nurpeisov's psychology finds special inspiration even in such a case. In the transition of the psychological reflection to the artistic nature the discussion raises the question whether it is right for a person who has lost his happiness to dump all the blame on the fate. Whether it is good or bad the internal features are given by the fate. The monologue of self verification turned into the monologue of self-accusation and exhausted the mind of the character. What does a tired mind do? Tanirbergen buries himself. A zhigit, who considered him to be clever, cunning, better than any other blames him mercilessly. He blames himself. He especially regrets that he was against the Reds.

Tanirbergen tortured with his internal dialogue to himself abjures everything. In time he disenchanted with life itself. "There is nothing of value in life." He became apathetic, weak-willed, and impassive. There is not even a thought of revenge to the ancient enemies. He does not care whether he exists or not, alive or dead. "Well, I don't care"—says Tanirbergen. To the tune of a "hero", talking to himself, a sad note of the author is added and rises to the level of the most complicated level of psychologism. The internal monologue often turns into an internal dialogue. Tanirbergen is "in the state of waking or sleeping". His wandering thoughts roamed everywhere. He recalled the legend of Husayyn, disputed hotly with everyone, isn't pleased with the Tsar, who had not managed to overcome.

The stream of consciousness enforces and flows out. It turns into a great philosophical direction. He is thinking about all the humanity in general. Now the novel raises the question about the proper use of human life. Otherwise, how can people fall from grace so greatly while the short life?

In such moments of the trilogy there is so little national background, thoughts rise to the common human level. At this point, one can realize that no matter how much mankind lived, it didn't reach the real essence of life, did not understand the mystery of God's ways.

The character of the Soviet atheistic period of The Blood and Sweat doesn't often recall God. For some reasons he doesn't call to read and understand Koran and God's way. God's name is not mentioned, but it presents. It is given overtones. Tanirbergen often directs his gaze to the sky. In the Turkic world, the sky, blueness and Tengri are the concepts of equal value.

When the inner monologue doesn't have enough time to comprehend all the past, the present horrors superimpose one upon the other. Tanirbergen recalls the time when they attacked a Turkmen village. One of the wives of Turkmen suddenly stopped crying and said: "You has deprived me of my only son and forced to look at the ground in the old age. Let God will punish you!" These words were repeated as by echo tormenting heart. And the nature seemed to turn away from him and turned into a symbolic image, which does not care of anything.

"The dark deep world suddenly turned red." He thinks it's a fire. He can see his brother who studied running to the fire, "Oh, poor thing ... stupid poor thing! Will a man of a sound mind fight a fire going at it? Ha-ha-ha!" He comes to life again before his mind faded. Tanirbergen erected his body once again looking at the sky. Disappointed in the ground, he now believes all his hope to the heaven.

"Tanirbergen has suffocated. It can't be that even the sky was unfair. "It's fair, fair, fair"—he wanted to cry, proclaiming throughout the deceitful world the truth just opened to him.

Nurpeisov's novel is valuable for its integrity of the national character. Describing the popular movement of 1916–1918's by terms of socio-psychological method, based on the developing of inner monologues the novel became a true epic of that period of time. In due course there were those who put the genre of the novel The Blood and Sweat against the epic genre. "The internal high-stakes drama breaking the outer shell, leads to value acquisition." Therefore, this is a novel of the "pure blood".

== A. Nurpeisov as a publicist ==
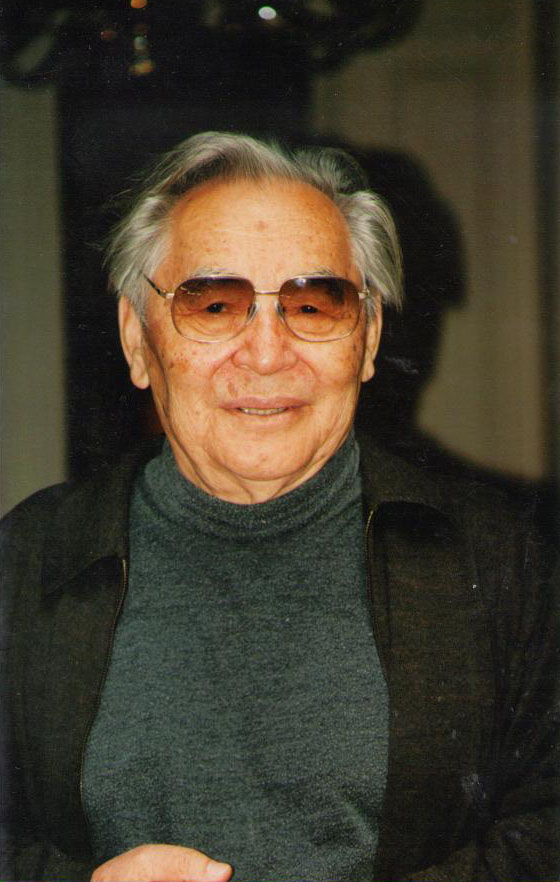
A. Nurpeisov as a publicist

A. Nurpeisov worked a lot in the field of literary translation, art journalism, essays and criticism. He translated into the Kazakh language writings by Anton Chekhov, Maxim Gorky, and Nâzım Hikmet.

In 1972 a set of writer's literary criticisms and essays "Reflection" ("Толғау") was published. Later it was enlarged under the title "The heart was full of songs". In 1996, the new articles, sketches and essays were included into the book "Raising up our holy" ("Қasietіңdіқadіrle").

In 1979 he published his essays at the Library of the Journal "Spark" "The Land of Blue Lakes" ("Kөgіldіr kөlder өlkesі"), in 1985 "The Legend of Akbiday". at the publishing house "Zhazushy". This is the benefit of Nurpeisov's daily life. He has always been sensitive to the people's life. His essay "Auten's Thoughts" has won the first award of "the Literary newspaper".

In 1971, in the library "Bibliotheca of the World Literature" by the publishing house "Fiction" in Moscow the epic novel by M. Auszov "Abai's Way" was published in two volumes. A. Nurpeisov, who wrote the foreword to it, starts as follows: "It's not easy to write about Mukhtar Auezov." A man of outstanding personality, great word-painter M. Auezov was introduced by him to the Soviet readers and foreign audience in full force and effect.

Nurpeisov in his essays, portraits uses skillful characters and syllogisms, concluding thoughts.

In the "Literary Gazette" and in other federal, national publishing houses, in various speeches at various festivals and anniversary celebrations the writer went on to talk about the best of writers. One by one essays about Leo Tolstoy, Fyodor Dostoevsky, Ivan Turgenev, Maxim Gorky, Leonid Leonov, Zhambyl, Sabit Mukanov, Gabite Musrepov, Gabiden Mustafin, Alexander Zataevich, Ahmet Zhubanov, Nurghis Tlendiev, H. Belger, etc. appeared.

In the article "The Word of Dostoevsky" Abdizhamil first delves into the Great Russian writer's works, reflects on the contribution of literature into society. He notes that in the days of Pushkin and Gogol the Russian literature raised up to a higher level. He says that a beautiful word containing a deep meaning becomes a social leitmotif, finding brave civil character. It composes a philosophy of life that is inherent in all humanity and grips the world; with specific examples he proves that Dostoevsky actually was a success in this field.

He reflects upon the unexplored side of friendship between Shockan Ualihanov and Dostoevsky. He puts much emphasis on the psychological context and mutual respect of the two sensible people. Usually cold, self-contained, taciturn Dostoevsky when he saw Shokan became cheerful, friendly and it surprised him, he said and tried to find the causes.

One of the pages of A. Nurpeisov's journalism is the current policy. Articles, sketches, essays written by the writer in recent years have been taken together in one volume called "Raising up our holy" and in 1996 it was published. The work is written in Russian. It was written in this language probably because many of rising problems devoted to Russian, the world public. If the title of the book translated into the Kazakh language it will mean "honor", "respect of spiritual values" ("Қasietіңdі қadіrle"). This is the title of an article included into the book. The article itself was devoted to the Kazakh youth who participated in the uprising in December 1986. It was published in the newspaper "Pravda" during the period of the Red Empire's strong anger. Though not all the pictures of the event could reveal, but the writer has raised a number of problems. The author writes: How long will greedy careerists hidden at the back of the Party cards dive their hands into one's pocket and head the country?

In a brief article A. Nurpeisov affects burning problems of the national policy. And his approach to the problem doesn't correspond with the official policy. For example, the author criticizes severely discriminatory treatment of the official policy to the educational affairs. It is said that there are more Kazakh children entering the higher education institutions but in fact less than a half of applicants study in the institutes and universities. Most of the students are of other nations. The writer gives advice to solve the problem and the other ones concerning youth. The article is full of anger and severe ridicule.

Nurpeisov's skills in the art of aitys, pamphlet not only shows one of the facets of his talent, but also proves the high level of modern journalism. For example, November 1, 1990, in the newspaper "Izvestia" a famous article "How we can develop Russia" by Aleksandr Solzhenitsyn was published. Nurpeisov replying to it in the article "Own and the other's pain" completely criticizes Solzhenitsyn's article, quotes and produces arguments. Solzhenitsyn is a world-famous polemicist, writer. He proved it well in the "Gulag Archipelago", and in his other works, in which he argues against the communist ideology. The Kazakh writer makes pressure on his sore "if I'm not true, who is true then."

The Kazakh writer to Solzhenitsyn's unreasonable accusation replies composedly referring to the facts: "From the Great Prince Fedor Ivanovich till Tsar Nicholas I the Russians had supported embassies and completed agreements with the Kazakh leaders. But according to your words it turns out that, from 1795 up to 1846 Russia was in negotiations about "their land" not with the Kazakhs but with someone else, he says ironically. He refers to the XV volume of F. A. Brokgauza's encyclopedia published in St. Petersburg in 1895 and produces clear evidence who mostly lived in the lands of the present-day Kazakhstan.

Great Mukhtar Auezov along with the writers in the mainstream calls Abdizhamil Nurpeisov's name with great respect.

Abdizhamil's books are translated into the languages of the former Soviet Union people (Russian, Ukrainian, Belarusian, Uzbek, Turkmen, Moldovan, Latvian, Estonian, Tajik, Yakut, etc.) and French, Spanish, Chinese, Arabic, Ethiopian, German, Austrian, Belgian, Czech, Romanian, Turkish into other languages and are recognized around the world.

In one of his essays Abdizhamil, making a portrait of his friend, the writer said "Every generation has their own cargo according to their ability to carry it. Though it is impossible for the next generation to develop, and raise revered national art house to another vertex, raised by yesterday's great ancestors, the new generation, both you and we must keep on the certain height, it is our responsibility, our duty, it is the test for all the talented children of the people. It's a test to undergo for us. How did we pass it? Moving forward with a pious hope whether could we find a stronger shoulder among us.

Nurpeisov's Prose audible, as the melody of the Aral Sea, the melody of the epoch is a priceless heritage, enriching the Kazakh literature and spiritual treasury of the people.
