= Moscow Ballet (United States) =

Russian ballet company

The Moscow Ballet

General information
- Name: The Moscow Ballet
- Local name: Московский балет
- Principal venue: Independent
- Website: www.nutcracker.com

Senior staff
- Chief executive: Akiva Talmi (AKA Clifford Fields) CEO of Akiva Talmi Presents Inc.

Other
- Parent company: Talmi Entertainment is the exclusive representation for Moscow Ballet's North American tours

Moscow Ballet has toured the United States and Canada during the holiday season since 1993 and is exclusively represented by Talmi Entertainment Inc for these tours. There are 70 to 80 Russian-trained classical dancers on the annual North American tour who fly in from the former republic of Russia. Stanislav Vlasov, a former principal artist of the Bolshoi Ballet, was the first artistic director on the North American tour in 1993. Vlasov's debut in the United States was at Carnegie Hall in 1957.

== History ==
Moscow Ballet's Great Russian Nutcracker and annual North American tours evolved out of the 1989-92 “Glasnost Festival” created by theatrical producer Akiva Talmi. The International Glasnost Festival Tours, starting in 1988, featured soloists from the Bolshoi Ballet, Kirov/Mariinsky Ballet, National Ballet of Czechoslovakia and more companies of Russian Federation countries.

The 1988 to 1991 tours included including Prima Ballerina Assoluta of the Stanislavsky Moscow Ballet Tatiana Chernobrovkina and partner Alexei Malykin of the Bolshoi Ballet. Kirov Artistic Director Oleg Vinogradov] arranged the appearances of Kirov (Mariinsky) principal artists Margarita Kullik and Vladimir Kim. Jana Kurova, winner of six International Ballet Competition gold medals, was Prima Ballerina from the Czechoslovak National Ballet in Prague and partner Stanislav Fetcho, currently Ballet Master of the prestigious Perm Ballet and former principal danseur at Kirov (Mariinsky) Ballet of St Petersburg; Maria Ivanova, former ballerina of the Stanislavski Ballet and currently head teacher at the preeminent Moscow State Academy of Choreography (commonly known as the Bolshoi School)” and her partner Andrei Glazsheider, dancer with the Stanislavsky Ballet in Moscow and finally, Svetlana Smirnova and Vadim Bondar of the Perm School. The program featured one ballet from each of the eastern bloc nations, and one ballet by each couple from classic repertory.

Akiva Talmi Presents Inc. produced the International Glasnost Tour in 1988 which premiered in Dartmouth, NH at the Warner Bentley Theater. For seven days scholars from Princeton, Dartmouth and other universities presented papers, read poetry, showed films, and dancers of Moscow Ballet’s Glasnost presented master classes and numerous concerts. The tour continued to Middlebury College VT, Purdue University IN, Vanderbilt University TN, Yale University’s Shubert Theater, University of South Carolina where PBS produced a TV special University North Carolina in Greensboro, Utica Symphony Hall in NY, Alabama Beethoven Society in Birmingham AL and Cleveland OH.

From 1994 to 1996 the Moscow Ballet engaged in a partnership with the Moscow Musical Theater for Children, founded by Natalya Sats. Moscow Ballet toured with the full orchestra of the Sats Theater, conducted by Andre Yakovlev.

In 1996 a full length production of Moscow Ballet's Great Russian Nutcracker was performed at Constitution Hall in Washington, D.C. This was the culmination of Moscow Ballet's relationship with the Sats Theater and was documented by South Carolina Educational Television. The performance was sponsored by the National Association for the Education of Young Children.

The set was designed by Valentin Fedorov, who studied at the Moscow Artistic Academic Theatre under Valery Levental of the Bolshoi Ballet. Since 1988, he has been the artistic director at the Chuvashia State Theatre of Opera and Ballet and has designed more than 40 productions for opera and ballet. In 1991, his "Blackberry Along the Fence" won the Best Performances of Russia Festival. He was given the title Honored Artist of Chuvashia.

Moscow Ballet's current staging of the Great Russian Nutcracker follows Tchaikovsky's complete Nutcracker Suite score. In Moscow Ballet's story the first act maintains the classic tradition and story line. In the second act, however, Masha a.k.a. Clara and her Prince travel to the Land Of Peace and Harmony instead of visiting the Sugar Plum Fairy, to fit the company's theme of international and cultural unity.

"It is the annual Christmas Eve party at the Staulbaum home. The adults dance exquisitely as presents are given to the children. Uncle Drosselmeyer arrives with a magical Nutcracker for Masha. Her brother Fritz soon becomes jealous of Masha and he races raucously around her, breaking the wondrous toy.

Masha is distraught and buries her face in a pillow until she eventually falls asleep. When she finally lifts her head, all is quiet and the house is empty. Out of the silent shadows the Rat King emerges, followed by a swarm of mice that threaten Masha. Without warning, the blazing red figure of the Nutcracker strides forth to defend her. The fight is fierce and the Nutcracker is wounded! Masha throws a slipper into the fray, knocking the Rat King unconscious. The mice recede into the shadows as their leader is defeated.

Uncle Drosselmeyer appears, and with a wave of his wand the Nutcracker Doll is transformed. In its place, a dashing Prince rises. Masha and her Prince travel to the Snow Forest where they are greeted by Father Christmas, the Snow Queen and her court. They are escorted to the realm of Peace & Harmony. Emissaries from around the world dance for the couple, honoring them. The flowers themselves seem to dance for Masha and the Prince! After the celebration, the couple perform a love duet, and the cheers rebound throughout the "Land of Peace & Harmony."

Over the years, the Moscow Ballet has featured ballerinas including Svetlana Smirnova, Predenia and Marina Alexandrova. The stars of the 2009 production are Cristina Terentieva and her husband Alexei Terentiev, as well as Akzhol Mussakhanov and Ekaterina Bortyakova (Terentieva won the Gold Medal at the Varna International Ballet Competition in 2008.)

The company has performed across the United States in theaters including the Orpheum in Minneapolis, the Majestic in Dallas, the Majestic in San Antonio, the Rosemont in Chicago and the Lyric Opera House in Baltimore.

== Sources ==
- Arkansas Democrat Gazette
- Brightest Young Things, Washington DC
- Dallas Theatrejones.com
- , Asheville, NC Mountain Express
- Daily Herald, Prince Albert
- Nanaimo, British Columbia
- Kamloops, British Columbia
- Daily Progress
- Charlottesville News and Arts
- My West Texas, Midland-Odessa
- Baltimore Sun
- Chicago Tribune
- Denver Post
- Minneapolis Pioneer Press
- Los Angeles Times
- Time Magazine, Washington DC
- Prince Albert Daily Herald
