= Shakarim Qudayberdiuli =

Kazakh composer and poet (1858–1931)

Haji Shakarim Qudayberdiuli
- Шәкәрім Құдайбердіұлы
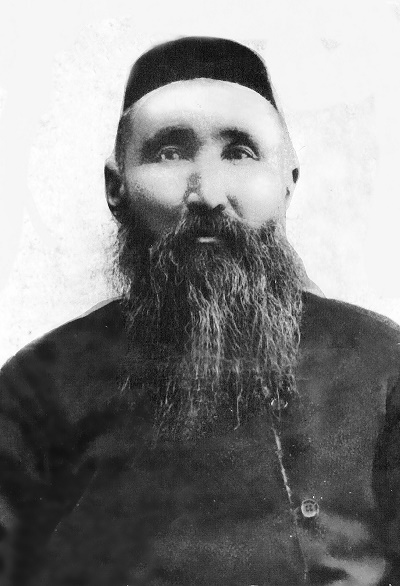
- Presumed identification photograph of Shakarim, circa 1905, reportedly prepared before his pilgrimage to Mecca

Personal life
- Born: 23 July 1858 (11 July O.S.) Ken-Bulak, Chingiz volost, Semipalatinsk uyezd, Russian Empire (present-day Abai District, Abai Region, Kazakhstan)
- Died: 2 October 1931 Chingiztau tract, Kazakh Autonomous Socialist Soviet Republic, Soviet Union
- Resting place: Zhidebai, Abai District, Abai Region, Kazakhstan, reinterred in 1961 beside Abai Qunanbaiuly
- Home town: Chingiztau, Semipalatinsk region
- Spouse: Mawen, Aighansha
- Parent(s): Qudaiberdy (father), Tölebike (mother)
- Era: 19th–20th centuries
- Region: Kazakh Steppe, Russian Empire, Soviet Union
- Main interest(s): Islamic theology, Islamic ethics, Islamic philosophy, conscience, morality, history, genealogy, poetry, music
- Notable idea(s): The ethics of conscience (ar-ily), moral self-cultivation, the relationship between faith, reason, science and ethical conduct
- Notable work(s): Üsh Anyq (Үш анық, Three Truths), Musylmandyk Sharty (Мұсылмандық шарты, The Conditions of Islam), Türik, Qırğız-Qazaq häm Handar Şejiresi (Түрік, қырғыз-қазақ һәм хандар шежіресі), Qazaq Aynasy (Қазақ айнасы), Qalqaman-Mamyr (Қалқаман-Мамыр), Enlik-Kebek (Еңлік-Кебек)
- Known for: Kazakh poetry and philosophy, Islamic theological and ethical writings, historical research, translations of Eastern and Russian literature
- Other names: Shakarim Haji (Шәкәрім қажы), Şäkärım Qūdaiberdıūly, Shakarim Qudaiberdiyev, Umıtılğan (Ұмытылған, "The Forgotten")
- Occupation: Poet, Philosopher, Historian, Theologian, Translator, Composer, Educator, volost ruler
- Relatives: Abai Qunanbaiuly (paternal uncle and mentor), Kunanbai (grandfather)

Religious life
- Denomination: Sunni
- Jurisprudence: Hanafi
- Creed: Maturidi

Senior posting
- Teacher: Abai Qunanbaiuly (mentor), an unnamed village mullah during his early childhood
- Influenced by: Abai Qunanbaiuly, Ismail Gasprinsky, Hafez, Fuzuli, Alisher Navoi, Alexander Pushkin, Leo Tolstoy, Lord Byron
- Influenced: Kazakh literature, Kazakh philosophical and ethical thought, later interpreters of traditional Kazakh Islamic thought

Shakarim Qudaiberdiuly (Kazakh: Шәкәрім Құдайбердіұлы, Şäkärım Qūdaiberdıūly, 23 July [O.S. 11 July] 1858 – 2 October 1931) was a Kazakh poet, Hanafi Maturidi theologian philosopher, historian, translator, and composer. He was a disciple and nephew of Abai Qunanbaiuly.

== Biography ==
Hailing from the Tobyqty clan of the Arghyn tribe, Shakarim worked as a politician and was elected as a volostnoy ruler. He only started writing literature in the year 1898, at the age of 40. and researched Eastern literature and such poets and philosophers like Hafez, Fuzuli, Ali-Shir Nava'i, and the works of Alexander Pushkin and Leo Tolstoy. His translation of the Hafiz and Pushkin's "Dubrovsky" remain notable. Shakarim was completely fluent in Arabic, Persian, Turkish and Russian. In 1903, he was accepted as a member of the West Siberian branch of the Russian Imperial Geographical Society.

In 1906, he has performed Hajj (with Qanapiya-qajy, grandfather of Bakhytzhan Kanapyanov). Having visited Egypt, Istanbul, he worked in libraries and sent all his books to Semipalatinsk (now Semey) by mail. His later years fell on a politically unstable period. During this time, he was a member of the Alash national movement.

Shakarim was a critic of socialism and having been informed on the changes to be implemented on the Kazakh lifestyle, he famously asked "For the sake of what, in the name of what and for what purpose to destroy, and what in return?". Having opposed the reforms, he decided to live in seclusion. From 1922, he resided in the mountains of Chingiztau.

On 2 October 1931, Shakarim was sentenced to death by shooting without any trial. Despite the commands of the Prosecutor General's Office stating his innocence, Shakarim's works have remained banned until the 1980s.

The works published by Shakarim himself include the book "The Kazakh Mirror" (Kazakh: Қазақ айнасы), the poem "Qalqaman-mamyr" and "Enlik-Kebek", individual poems, articles and essays were published from 1913 to 1924 in the magazines "Abay", "Aykap", "Sholpan", the newspapers "Kazakh", "Abay" and "Sholpan" published his translations from Hafez and Fuzuli's poem "Leyli and Majnun". Poetic translations of "Dubrovsky" and "The Blizzard" by Alexander Pushkin were published in 1936 in Alma-Ata (now Almaty) in the journal "Adebiet Maidana". Bakhytzhan Kanapyanov translated his works to Russian in 1989.

== Remembrance ==
- The Shakarim University in Semey is named after Shakarim
- During the commemoration of the 150th anniversary of the poet, 2008 was declared the "Year of Shakarim" in Kazakhstan.
- In the central park of the city Semey there is a statue of Shakarim Qudaiberdiuly done by sculptor Shot-Aman Ualikhan.
- In 2008 a postcard was made in memory of Shakarim.
