= Kazakh State Academic Theater for Children and Youth =

Coordinates: 43°15′57″N 76°56′28″E

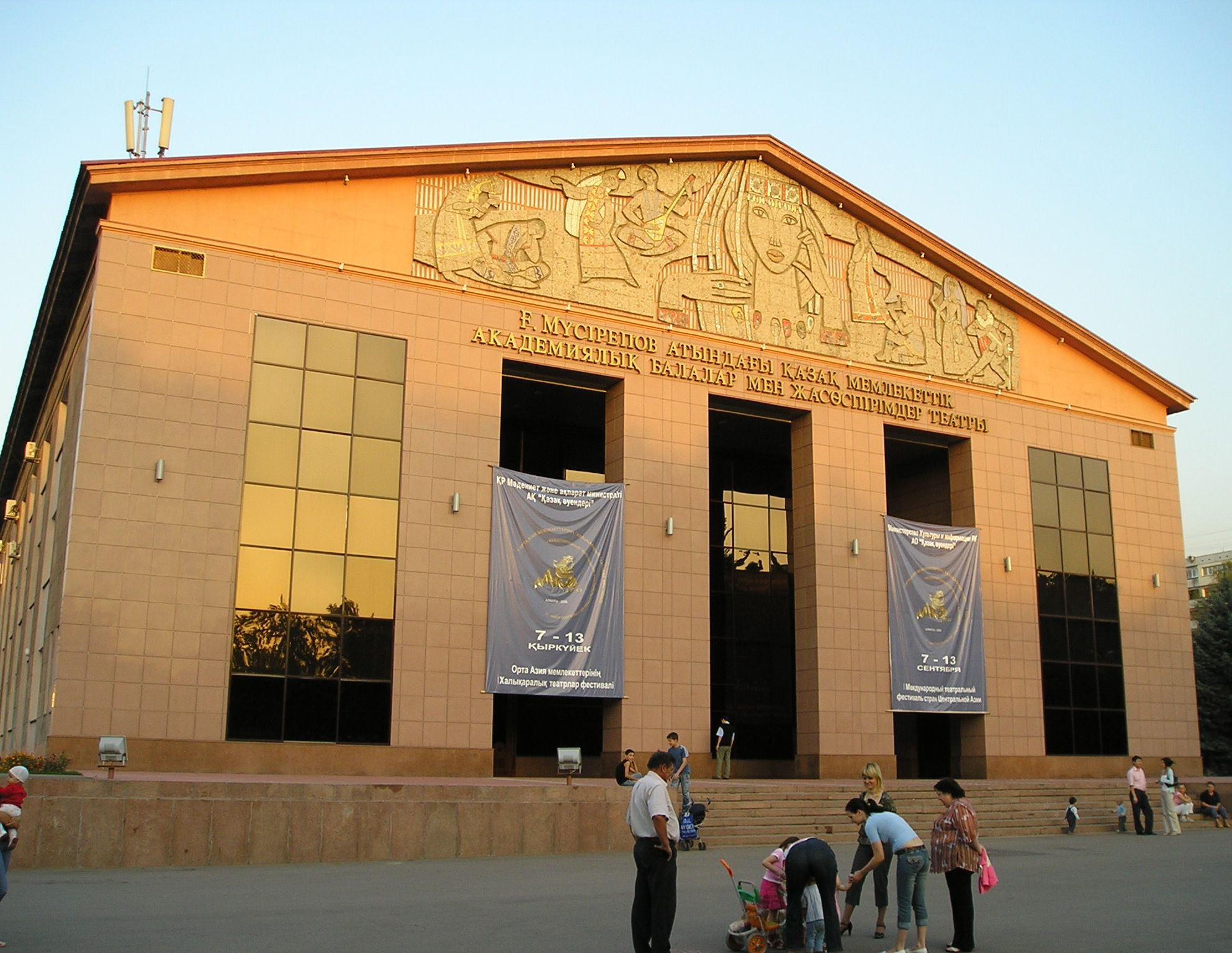
- Interactive map of Kazakh State Academic Theater for Children and Youth
- Address: 38 Abylai Khan Avenue; Almaty; Kazakhstan

Construction
- Opened: 1946

Website
- http://teatr-musrepov.kz/

The Kazakh State Academic Theater for Children and Youth named after G. Musrepov (Kazakh: Ғабит Мүсірепов атындағы Қазақ Мемлекеттік Академиялық балалар мен жасөспірімдер театры, romanized: Ğabit Müsırepov atyndağy Qazaq Memlekettık Akademiialyq balalar men jasöspırımder teatry, Russian: Казахский государственный академический театр для детей и юношества имени Г. Мусрепова) is a theater for young spectators in Almaty, Kazakhstan, giving performances in the Kazakh language.

== History ==
The main initiator and the first director of the theater was Natalya Sats, who was in exile in Almaty. On 6 September 1944 the Council of People's Commissars of the Communist Party (Bolsheviks) of Kazakhstan issued a decree "On Organizing a Theatre for Young Spectators in Alma-Ata". On 7 November 1945 the theater presented its first performances to the people of Almaty: there was "Little Red Riding Hood" by Evgeny Schwartz directed by Natalya Sats in the morning and in the evening "The Siege of Leiden" by Isidor Stock which was directed by playwright Viktor Rozov.

Performances were initially staged in Russian; the Kazakh troupe was founded in 1946. The first performance in Kazakh was "Altyn kilt" (a translation of Aleksey Tolstoy's eponymous play). From 1946 to 1985 several dozen performances in the Kazakh language were staged.

In 1985, by Decree No. 50 of the Ministry of Culture of the Kazakh Soviet Socialist Republic, as of 24 February, the Theater for Children and Youth of Kazakhstan was divided into two independent companies: the Kazakh Theater, which was named after the Kazakh writer and playwright Gabit Musrepov, and the Russian Theater, which was named after Natalia Sats. In 1996 the theater was awarded the honorary title of an academic theater.

== Architecture ==
The theater stands on the former site of the Church of the Intercession of the Holy Mother of God, which was demolished in 1934.

Construction started in 1957 and finished in 1962. The building stood on Comintern Square, and opposite A. Imanov Square. The designers of the building were architects A. A. Leppik, N. I. Ripinsky and V. Z. Katsev.

The theater building was constructed in transiting style from classicist to functionalist traditions. It is a three-storey volume on a stylobate, with the main facade oriented to the west. The main entrance is accentuated by a deep loggia in the form of a stylized portico. The pediment is ornamented with a relief panel on Kazakh musical folklore theme. The wall planes of the side pylons and the loggia are partitioned in height by stained glass windows.

== Heritage status ==
On 10 November 2010, the new State List of Historical and Cultural Monuments of Local Significance in Almaty was approved, simultaneously with which all previous decisions on this subject were declared no longer valid. This decree retained the status of a monument of local importance of the theater building.
