= Balasaz =

Balasaz Баласаз
- Village
- Location in Kazakhstan
- Coordinates: 45°8′40″N 79°24′40″E
- Country: Kazakhstan
- Region: Almaty Region
- District: Aksu District, Almaty Region

Population (2009)
  - Total: 83
- Time zone: UTC+6 (Omsk Time)

Balasaz (Kazakh: Баласаз, Balasaz) is a village in Jetisu Region of south-eastern Kazakhstan.
