= Ashchibulak =

Ashchibulak Ащыбұлақ
- Village
- Location in Kazakhstan
- Coordinates: 45°15′20″N 79°31′10″E
- Country: Kazakhstan
- Region: Jetisu Region
- District: Aksu District

Population (2009)
  - Total: 600
- Time zone: UTC+6 (Omsk Time)

Ashchibulak (Kazakh: Ащыбұлақ, Aşybūlaq) is a village in Jetisu Region of south-eastern Kazakhstan.
