= Kanseyt Abdezuly =

Kazakhstani philologist

Kanseyt Abdezuly (Kazakh: Qanseiıt Äbdezūly, Қансейiт Әбдезұлы) is a Kazakhstani philologist. He is a Dean and Professor of the Philology faculty in Al-Farabi Kazakh National University. He is a member of the Writers' Union of Kazakhstan, a body of the country's elite writers.
