= Molaly =

Molaly Молалы
- Village
- Location in Kazakhstan
- Coordinates: 45°27′10″N 78°18′53″E
- Country: Kazakhstan
- Region: Jetisu Region
- District: Aksu District

Population (2009)
  - Total: 213
- Time zone: UTC+6 (Omsk Time)

Molaly (Kazakh: Молалы, Molaly) is a village in Jetisu Region, in south-eastern Kazakhstan.
