= Ilyas Zhansugurov =

Kazakh poet and writer

- Ілияс Жансүгіров
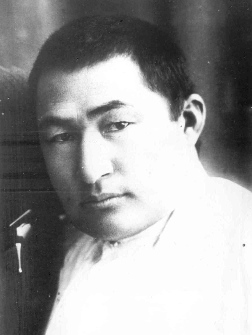
- Zhansugurov, presumably 1920s
- Born: 1 May 1894 aul № 4, Aksu Volost, Kopalsky uezd, Semirechye Oblast, Russian Empire
- Died: 26 February 1938 (aged 43); Almaty, Kazakh SSR, USSR
- Occupations: Poet; journalist; playwright
- Children: 6
- Writing career
- Language: Kazakh

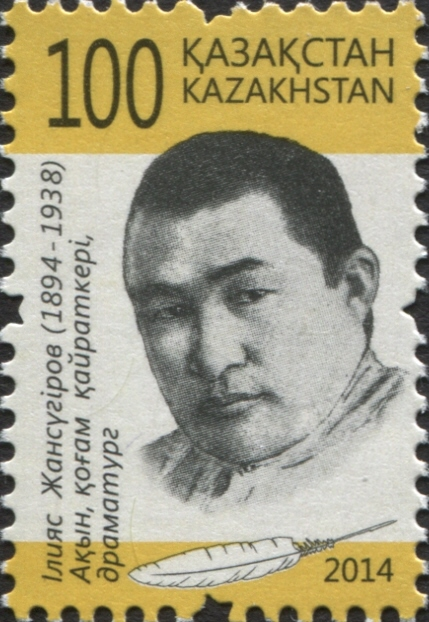
Zhansugurov on a 2014 stamp of Kazakhstan

Ilyas Zhansugurov (Kazakh: Ілияс Жансүгіров, Ilias Jansügırov; 1 May 1894 — 26 February 1938) was a Kazakh poet and writer. He made a significant contribution to the development of national poetic culture, creatively developed the traditions of Kazakh oral folk art. The town of Zhansugirov in Almaty Province is named after him and he is commemorated in Taldykorgan and Almaty.

A friend of another classic writer Mukhtar Auezov, Zhansugurov was the First President of the Writers' Union of Kazakhstan from 1934 to 1936. He wrote the novel Comrades (1933), targeted against the Soviet power, but also wrote loving poems such as The Steppe (1930) and Kulager (1936). He was repressed in 1937, as his writing was seen as a fuel for Kazakh nationalism, and shot on 26 February 1938.

The I. Zhansugurov Literary Museum is a center dedicated to the study of his work.
