= Bakhytzhan Kanapyanov =

Kazakhstani poet and writer (born 1951)

- Бақытжан Қанапиянов
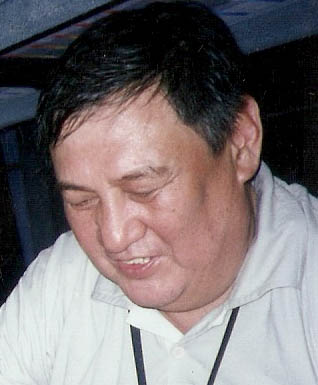
- Kanapyanov in 2003
- Born: Bakhytzhan Musakhanovich Kanapyanov; October 4, 1951; Kokshetau, USSR
- Education: Zhibek Zholy (Publishing House)
- Occupations: Writer; publisher; translator; movie director
- Writing career
- Language: Kazakh, Russian
- Notable works: "Stork on the Pripyat River", "Kochevaya zvezda", "Smuglaya Luna"
- Website: bkanapyanov.info

Bakhytzhan Musakhanuli Kanapyanov (Kazakh: Бақытжан Мусаханұлы Қанапиянов, Baqytjan Musahanūly Qanapiianov; born October 4, 1951) is a Kazakh poet, writer, publisher, and translator. Kanapyanov is a member of the Russian and the Kazakh PEN clubs, an honorary professor at the Shakarim University (Semey) and an academician of the Crimean Literary Academy (Simferopol, Crimea).

== Early life ==
Kanapyanov was born on October 4, 1951, in Kokshetau to a teacher. He went to school in the village of Sirimbet, where the family estate of the scholar and historian Shoqan Walikhanov (1835–1865), who is related to the poet, was located. After his initial education, Kanapyanov became a metallurgical engineer. He then completed higher courses for directors and screenwriters in Moscow in the class of Emil Lotianu, and then higher literary courses at the Association of Writers of the USSR at the seminars of Alexander Mezhirov.

Kanapyanov worked as a research engineer at the Institute of Metallurgy of the Academy of Sciences of the Kazakh SSR, and also as a screenwriter, director and editor in the film studios "Kazakhfilm" and "Mosfilm", produced in Kazakhstan. In 1971 he met Olzhas Suleimanov, which influenced the further fate of the young poet.

== Literature works ==
He published his introductory poems in 1975 in the magazine "Space/Prostor", then he published poetry and poems in periodicals in many countries around the world. He is the author of more than thirty books of poetry and prose, which have been printed by Kazakhstan, Russia, Belarus, Armenia, Ukraine, the United States, Great Britain, Malaysia, Poland, France, Mongolia, Serbia, Bosnia and Herzegovina, Croatia and Turkey.

Kanapyanov writes in Kazakh and Russian and is widely recognised for multicultural approach. He collected folk songs from across Kazakhstan and translated them into Russian, often revising and adopting them. One of the most famous translation – is the Kazakh national epic song Kyz-Zhibek. His translations into Russian include Turkish poet Nazim Hikmet, French poet Paul Valéry and ct. Among Kazakh poets translated and adopted by Kanapyanov are Abay Qunanbayuli, Jambyl Jabayev, Kenen Azerbayev, Shakarim Qudayberdiuli, Magzhan Zhumabayev.

He is the author of the idea of holding the World Poetry Day, which was heard for the first time in 1996 in Almaty, at the poetry evening of Andrey Voznesenskiy and Bela Ahmadulina.

His books were translated in more than 20 languages, including English, Finnish, Georgian, German, Korean, Polish, Malay, Yakut, Serbian, Croatian, Macedonian, Hungarian, Belarusian and Ukrainian.

== Notable titles ==
Bakhytzhan Kanapyanov is well-known as:

- a member of the Kazakh and Russian PEN Club;
- the secretary of the board of the Association of Writers of Kazakhstan;
- a correspondent for "Literature newspaper" in the Republic of Kazakhstan;
- a member of the board of the European Congress of Writers (Prague), which represents the region of Central Asia and Kazakhstan;
- an honorary professor at the Shakarima University (Semipalatinsk);
- an academician of the Crimean Literary Academy (Simferopol, Crimea). He is an academic of journalism in Kazakhstan;
- participated in the repair of the accident at the Chernobyl nuclear power plant (1986–1988).

== Poetry collections ==
- «Nochnaya prohlada/Ночная прохлада» (1977)
- «Otrazheniya/Отражения» (1979)
- «Chuvstvo mira/Чувство мира» (1982)
- «Vetv/Ветвь» (1985)
- «Liniya sudby/Линия судьбы» (1987)
- «Aist nad Pripyatyu: stihi i proza/Аист над Припятью: стихи и проза». — Алматы: «Жалын», (1987)
- «Kochevaya zvezda: stihi i poemy/Кочевая звезда: стихи и поэмы». — Алматы: «Жазушы», (1991)
- «Gornaya okraina/Горная окраина» (1995)
- «Vremya tishiny/Время тишины» (1995)
- «Nad urovnem zhizni/Над уровнем жизни» (1999)
- «Tikshyrau/Тикшырау» (2001)
- «Kanikuly kochevya/Каникулы кочевья» (2003)
- «Plyvut oblaka/Плывут облака» (2003)
- «Smuglaya Luna/Смуглая Луна» (2006)

== Prose collections ==
- «Bakhchisaray» (Бахчисарай). // Dewan Sastera, bil. 4, jilid 33. Kuala Lumpur, 2003, hlm. 51–53
- «Coffee break/Кофе-брейк (Заметки, Эссе, Диалоги)». — «Простор», 2004
- «Letniy kinoteatr/Летний кинотеатр» (рассказ); «Svetlyachki/Светлячки» (повесть)// «Нива», No. 2. Астана, 2008, с. 89–119. ("Kelip-Kelip" – 2020).

== Translation works ==
- "Kyz-Zhibek/Қыз-Жібек". — Zhalyn/Жалын, 1988.

== Filmography ==
Screenplays

- Shkola rabochih profesiy/Школа рабочих профессий, Kazakhfilm, (1979)
- Rovesniki/Ровесники (1980)
- Abay. Zhizn i tvorchestvo/Абай. Жизнь и творчество (1980)
- Balhashskaya saga/Балхашская сага (1990)
- Posledyaya osen Shakarima/Последняя осень Шакарима (1992)
- Bessonica: Parizh/Бессонница: Париж (1996)
- Volnyy gorod Frankfurt/Вольный город Франкфурт (1997)
- Purkua?/Пуркуа? (1998).

The Author and the director of

- Landshafty/Ландшафты (1999)
- Den Rafael/День — Рафаэль (2000)
- Skrymtymnym/Скрымтымным (2000)
- Foot-ball/Фут-боль (2000)
- International Poetry Day/Международный день поэзии (2000).

== Public activism ==
In 1984 Kanapyanov became the editor-in-chief of one of the largest publishing house in Kazakhstan – Jalyn. He kept this position until the year 1991 when the USSR, communist party and all censoring mechanisms collapsed. This allowed him to founder first independent publishing house in Kazakhstan – Jibek Joly (Silk Road). Now Zhibek Zholy is famous for its ongoing support to young authors and especially poets in Kazakhstan, Russia and worldwide. Zhibek Zholy publishes a lot on education, folklore, philosophy, linguistics and history studies.

Kanapyanov was an active member of Nuclear disarmament movement and together with Olzhas Suleimenov was one of the founders of "Nevada-Semei" movement which ultimate aim was to close the nuclear test centers in Semipalatinsk and Nevada. He was a volunteers in Chernobyl trying to raise worldwide awareness of the tragedy – Chernobyl disaster. These efforts resulted in a book of verses ″Stork on the Pripyat River″ later translated in many languages.

== Awards ==
Kanapyanov is a laureate of many international literary awards, including "Alash", "Tarlan", International Poetry Competition "Hope the Golden Lyre" (New York City, US, 2004), Anton Delvig Sverdlovsk Award (2013), MO Auez Award of the Kazakh PEN Club (2014). His poetic works have been translated into many languages in the world, and have entered the literary anthologies of countries near and far abroad.

An Honored Activist of the Republic of Kazakhstan (2011), Honored Worker of the Republic of Kazakhstan (1998), Kanapyanov is also the winner of the popular vote "El Tulgasi" – "Name of the Fatherland" in the nomination "Culture and Art" (2012).

He was awarded the orders "Parasat", "Dostyq" 2nd degree "For contribution to culture" of the International Committee of Peace and Harmony (Moscow), medals of Kazakhstan, Russia and Ukraine.

Winner of the State Award of the Republic of Kazakhstan named of Abay for 2020.

== Literature ==
- Бахтин М. Вопросы литературы и эстетики. — М.: «Художественная литература», 1975
- В. П. Максимов «Свет кочевой звезды», М, 2000
- На стыке веков. Литературные материалы о творчестве Б. Канапьянова. — Алматы: «Галым», 2001.
- Мананникова, Л. Б. «Стихи под взглядом неба. Этюды о поэзии Б. Канапьянова», 2002
- Бадиков, В. В. «Линия судьбы. Творчество Бахытжана Канапьянова в историко-литературном контексте эпохи» (2002)
- Бадиков, В. В. Новые ветры: очерки современного литературного процесса Казахстана / В. В. Бадиков. — Алматы: «Жибек жолы», 2005.
- Келейникова Н. М. «Батытжан Канапьянов — поэт, философ, живой классик», Вестник Пятигорского лингвистического университета, 2003, No. 1.
- Казахская литература: хрестоматия: учебное пособие для 10—11 кл. общеобразовательной школы / сост. Х. А. Адибаев. — Алматы: «Мектеп», 2004.
- Гольбрахт, М. Услышать небо и землю: о книге Б. Канапьянова «Стихи под взглядом неба» // Книголюб. — 2002.- No. 13 (июль).
- Гольбрахт, М. Ничто так не ставит всё на свои места — как время: беседа с поэтом Б. Канапьяновым // Книголюб. — 2002. — No. 13 (июль).
- Дергачёв, В. Поэт ночной прохлады: о Б. Канапьянове // «Новое поколение», 21 сентября 2001.
- Джуанышбеков, Н. Творческий портрет писателя: Бахытжан Канапьянов: история казахстанской литературы // Книголюб.- 2006.- No. 3.
- Кешин, К. Пора зрелости: творческий портрет поэта Б. Канапьянова // «Мысль». — 2001. — No. 9.
- Кешин, К. Посади дерево, человек!: поэту Б. Канапьянову — 50 лет // «Казахстанская правда», 18 сентября 2001.
- Кешин, К. Над уровнем жизни: беседа с поэтом Б. Канапьяновым // «Казахстанская правда», 10 января 2000.
- Кузнецова, Е. В заботе о вечном бытии культуры: культурное наследие: [о книге Б. Канапьянова «Казахская юрта»] // «Казахстанская правда», 23 сентября 2006.
- Курпякова, Н. Константа вечных странствий: о книге Б. Канапьянова «Каникулы кочевья» // «Казахстанская правда», 2 декабря 2006.
- Шашкова, Л. Звёздное кочевье: на соискание Государственной премии: [о писателе Б. Канапьянове] // «Казахстанская правда», 27 ноября 2004.
