= Zhansugirov =

Zhansugirov Жансүгіров
- Village
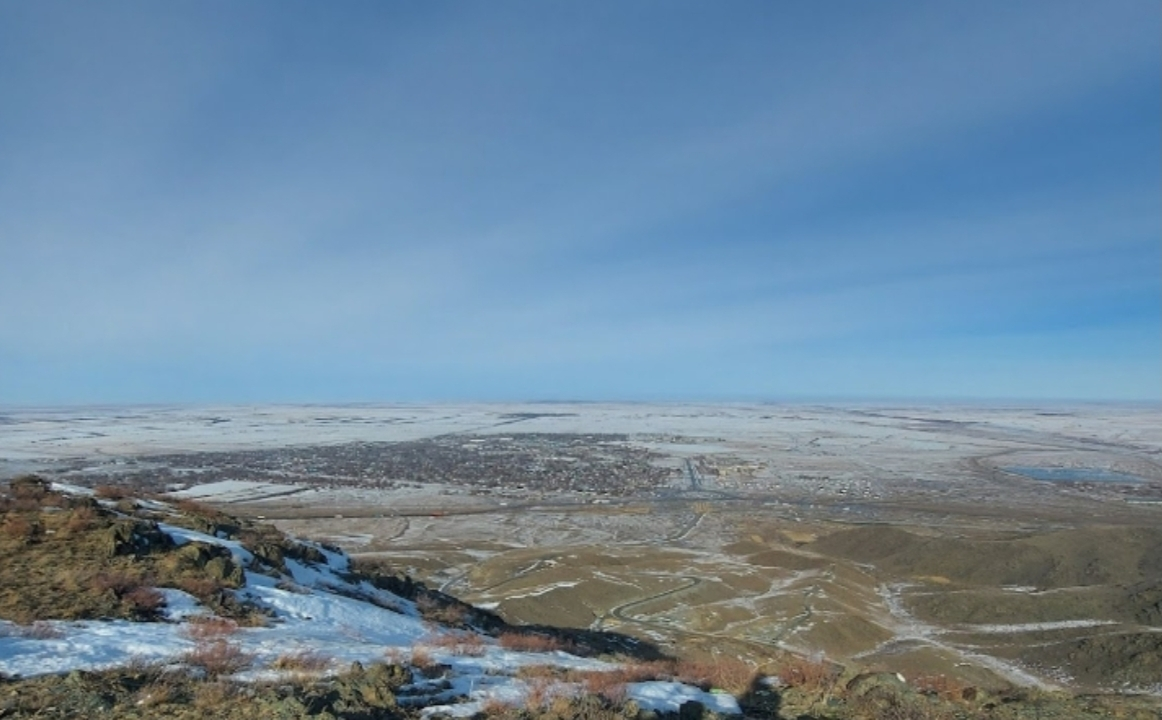

- Location in Kazakhstan
- Coordinates: 45°23′19″N 79°30′8″E
- Country: Kazakhstan
- Region: Jetisu Region
- District: Aksu District

Population (2009)
  - Total: 8,288
- Demonym: Zhansugirovish
- Time zone: UTC+6 (Omsk Time)
- Postal code: 040100
- Area code: 72832

Zhansugirov (Kazakh: Жансүгіров, romanized: Jansügırov) is a village in Aksu District, Jetisu Region, Kazakhstan. It is the administrative center of the district. The population as of the 2009 Census was 8,288.

The town was named after one of the leading names in Kazakh literature, Ilyas Zhansugurov.

== Economy ==
The town has a sugar processing plant, that makes up most of its economy.
