= Museum Complex of S. Mukanov and G. Musrepov =

Coordinates: 43°15′3.7″N 76°56′55.3″E

State Literary and Memorial Museum Complex of S. Mukanov and G. Musrepov
- Established: 1999
- Location: 125 Tulebaeva Street, Almaty, Kazakhstan
- Type: Memorial museum

State Literary and Memorial Museum Complex of S. Mukanov and G. Musrepov (Kazakh: С.Мұқанов пен Ғ.Мүсреповтің әдеби-мемориалдық музей кешені, romanized: S.Mūqanov pen Ğ.Müsrepovtıñ ädebi-memorialdyq muzei keşenı, Russian: Государственный литературно-мемориальный музейный комплекс С. Муканова и Г. Мусрепова, tr. gosudarstvennyi literaturmo-memorialnyi muzeinyi kompleks) is a memorial museum in Almaty, Kazakhstan, located in the house where Gabit Musrepov and Sabit Mukanov lived.

== History ==
The S. Mukanov Literary and Memorial Museum was opened in 1978 at the initiative of Hakim Bekishev, a family friend. Under his leadership in 1976 was the beginning of the exposition of the museum, which was created by the creative team of artist-restorer Shamil Kozhakhanov. The work continued for two years and on 21 November 1978 the opening ceremony of the writer's house-museum took place. In the same year a memorial plaque by sculptor Toktagazy Dzhanyzbekbekov was installed on the house where Sabit Mukanov lived.

In 1989, the creative team headed by Beket Musrepov, a member of the Union of Designers of the Republic of Kazakhstan, made a re-exposition in the museum.

In 1987, in the same house was created a memorial house-museum of G. Musrepov. The writer's daughter Engelina Musrepova became the founder of the museum.

The State Literary and Memorial Museum Complex of Sabit Mukanov and Gabit Musrepov was established on 8 February 1999 on the basis of the two existing museums of S. Mukanov and G. Musrepov.

== Museum exposition ==
The museum consists of two parts: the literary and the memorial.

The literary part of the museum has one room. At the entrance to the museum hangs a portrait of G. Musrepov.

The literary exposition of the museum reflects life and career of the writers: youth, years of study, formation of S. Mukanov and G. Musrepov as writers, as well as their social and political activities. The museum displays literary documentary materials, manuscripts and diary entries, as well as collections of writers' works translated into more than 50 languages of the world.

The memorial section has an office, a library, a living room and a bedroom. All rooms are preserved in the condition as they were when the writers were alive. One of the valuable exhibits is Shokan's knife. It was here that S. Mukanov wrote a novel about Shoqan Walikhanov.

The memorial section includes exhibits describing the life of the writers, personal belongings, books and much more. Every thing, every exhibit in the museum that is related to the life and works of the writer has its own story and helps recreate the atmosphere in which he lived and created.

== Monument status ==
On 19 November 2010, a new State List of Historical and Cultural Monuments of Local Significance in the City of Almaty was approved, simultaneously with which all previous decisions on this subject were declared null and void. In this Resolution, the status of a monument of local importance to the museum complex was retained. The boundaries of the protection zones were approved in 2014.
