= Sabit Mukanov =

Kazakh poet, writer, social activist, and academic (1900–1973)

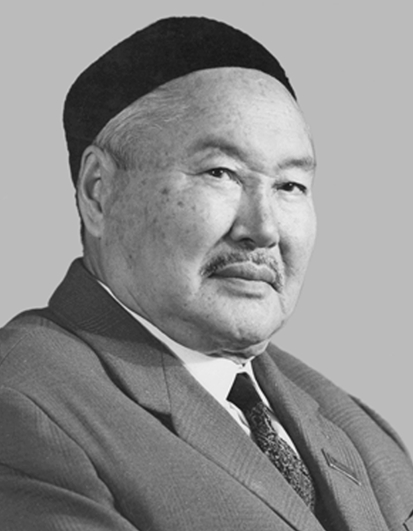
- Born: Sábıt Muqanuly Muqanov; April 26, 1900; Petropavlovsky Uyezd, Akmolinsk Oblast, Russian Empire
- Died: April 18, 1973 (aged 72); Almaty, Kazakh SSR, Soviet Union
- Occupations: Poet, writer, scientist, politician, publicist
- Years active: 1928–1973

Sabit Mukanov (Kazakh: Сәбит Мұқанұлы Мұқанов, Sábıt Muqanuly Muqanov, Russian: Сабит Муканович Муканов, transliterated Sabit Mukanovich Mukanov; 26 April 1900 – 18 April 1973) was a Kazakh and Soviet poet, writer, publicist, scientist Academician of the Kazakh Academy of Sciences. Sabit Mukanov played also a major role in the political and public life of Kazakhstan.

He was the head of the Writers' Union of Kazakhstan in 1936-37 and again from 1943 to 1952.

Sabit Mukanov was born to a Muslim family in Tauzar Volost of Akmolinsk Oblast (now The North Kazakhstan Region). His family worked mostly as cattle ranchers for rich people. In 1918 Sabit Mukanov took part in the civil war. He studied in the Institute of Red Professorship in Moscow from 1930 to 1935. Mukanov's earliest novels were Son of Bai (1928), Pure Love (1931), and Temirtas (Iron Stone) (1935).

Mukanov was the author of several novels, such as Botagoz, Syrdaria, the autobiographical trilogy School of life, Flashed Meteor, etc. Mukanov studied the history and theory of literature, especially Kazakh literature of the 19th and 20th centuries, such as the works of Kazakh prose writers and poets Saken Seifullin, Mukhtar Auezov, Tair Zharokov, and Abdilda Tazhibayev. He also researched the scientific and literary heritage of Shokan Ualikhanov and Abai Qunanbaiuly and was the first to expound the life and works of the great Kazakh poet Zhambyl Zhabayuly. In 1974 his ethnographic work "National Heritage" was published posthumously, which included research about ancient folk traditions, shezhire (Kazakh genealogy), the social-economical factors and spiritual life of pre-revolutionary Kazakhs.

His works have been translated into more than 46 languages and his books are in the US Library of Congress. Sabit Mukanov's biography was included in the international encyclopedia "Who is Who?"(USA, 1969).

He died in 1973 in Almaty, Kazakhstan. The Museum Complex of S. Mukanov and G. Musrepov is in Almaty. The North Kazakhstan Kazakh Musical and Drama Theatre is named after Sabit Mukanov.

== Awards ==
- Premium of Academy of Science of Kazakh SSR named after Shokan Ualikhanov (1966)
- State premium of Kazakh SSR named after Abai Qunanbaiuly
- Two Orders of Lenin
- Two Orders of the Red Banner of Labour
- Order of the Badge of Honour
