= Kazakh literature =

Kazakh literature is defined as 'the body of literature, both oral and written, produced in the Kazakh language by the Kazakh people of Central Asia'.

Kazakh literature expands from the current territory of Kazakhstan, also including the era of the Kazakh Soviet Socialist Republic, Kazakh recognised territory under the Russian Empire, and the Kazakh Khanate. There is some overlap with several complementary themes, including the literature of Turkic tribes that inhabited Kazakhstan over the course of history, and literature written by ethnic Kazakhs.

== Medieval literature ==
According to Chinese written sources from the 6th to 8th centuries CE, the Turkic tribes of Kazakhstan had an oral poetry tradition. These works came from earlier periods and were primarily transmitted by bards: professional storytellers and musical performers. Traces of this tradition are found on Orkhon script stone carvings dating from the 5th to 7th centuries CE, which describe the rule of Kultegin and Bilge, two early Turkic rulers ('kagans'). Among the Kazakhs, the bard was primarily, though not exclusively, a male profession. From at least the 17th century, Kazakh bards could be divided into two main categories: the zhıraws (zhiraus, žyraus), who passed on the works of others and usually did not create or add their own original work; and the aqyns (akyns), who improvised or created their own poems, stories, or songs. There were several types of works, such as didactic termes, elegiac tolgaws, and epic zhırs.

Although the origins of such tales are often unknown, most of them were associated with bards of the recent or more distant past, who supposedly created them or passed them on, by the time most Kazakh poetry and prose was first written down in the second half of the 19th century. There are clear stylistic differences between works first created in the 19th century and works dating from earlier periods but not documented before the 19th century, such as those attributed to such 16th- and 17th-century bards as Er Shoban and Dosmombet Zhıraw (also known as Dospambet Žyrau; he appears to have been literate, and reportedly visited Constantinople), and even to such 15th-century bards as Shalkiz and Asan Qayghı. Other notable bards include Kaztugan Žyrau, Žiembet Žyrau, Axtamberdy Žyrau, and Buxar Žyrau Kalkamanuly, who was an advisor to Ablai Khan, and whose works have been preserved by Mäšhür Žüsip Köpeev. Er Targhın and Alpamıs are two of the most famous examples of Kazakh literature to be recorded in the 19th century.

The Book of Dede Korkut and the Oguz Name (a story of the ancient Turkic king Oghuz Khan) are the most well-known Turkic heroic legends. Initially created around the 9th century CE, they were passed down through generations in oral form. The legendary tales were recorded by Turkish authors in the 14th to 16th centuries CE.

== Modern literature ==
=== Abai Qunanbaiuly ===
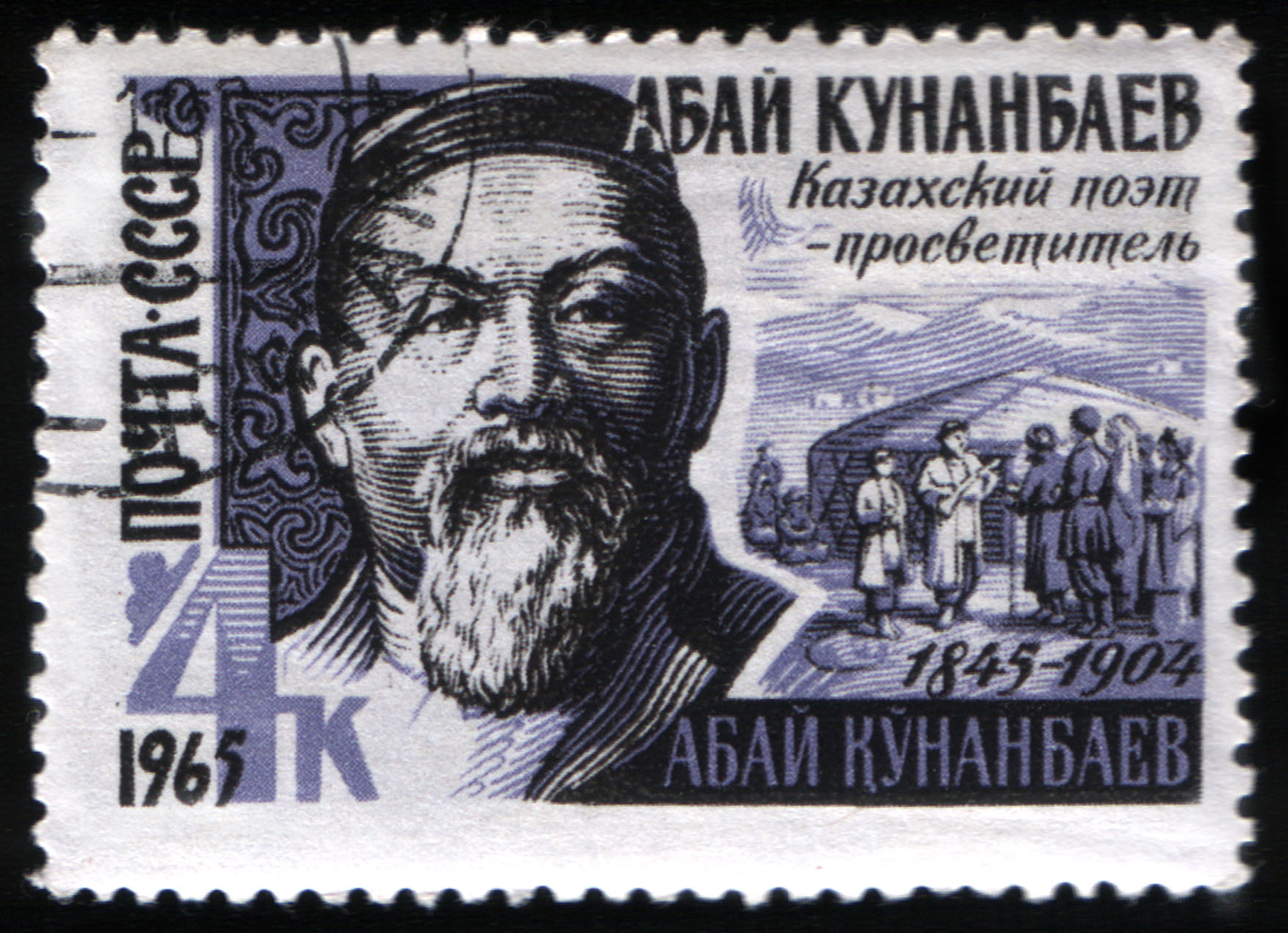
1965 post mark of Soviet Union honoring Abai Qunanbaiuly.

The pre-eminent role in the development of modern literary Kazakh belongs to Abai Qunanbaiuly (Kazakh: Абай Құнанбайұлы, sometimes Russified to Abay Kunanbayev, Абай Кунанбаев) (1845–1904), whose writings did much to preserve Kazakh folk culture. Abai's major work is The Book of Words (Kazakh: қара сөздері, Qara sözderi), a philosophical treatise and collection of poems in which he criticises Russian colonial policies and encourages other Kazakhs to embrace education and literacy.

=== Ay Qap and Qazaq ===
The literary magazines Ay Qap (published between 1911 and 1915 in Arabic script) and Qazaq (published between 1913 and 1918) played an important role in the development of intellectual and political life among early 20th-century Kazakhs.

== Translated works ==
In 2021, the government of Kazakhstan funded the translation of 100 famous international pieces of literature and textbooks into the Kazakh language. Translated works include topics from the humanities, best-selling modern classics, economics and social science textbooks, and more.

== See also ==
- Writers' Union of Kazakhstan
- List of libraries in Kazakhstan
