= Kyz-Zhibek =

Kazakh poetic folk legend from the 16th century

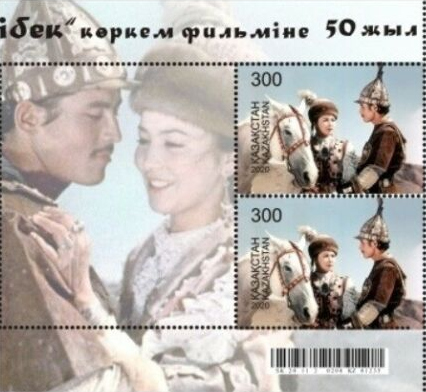
A 2020 stamp sheet dedicated to the 1970 film

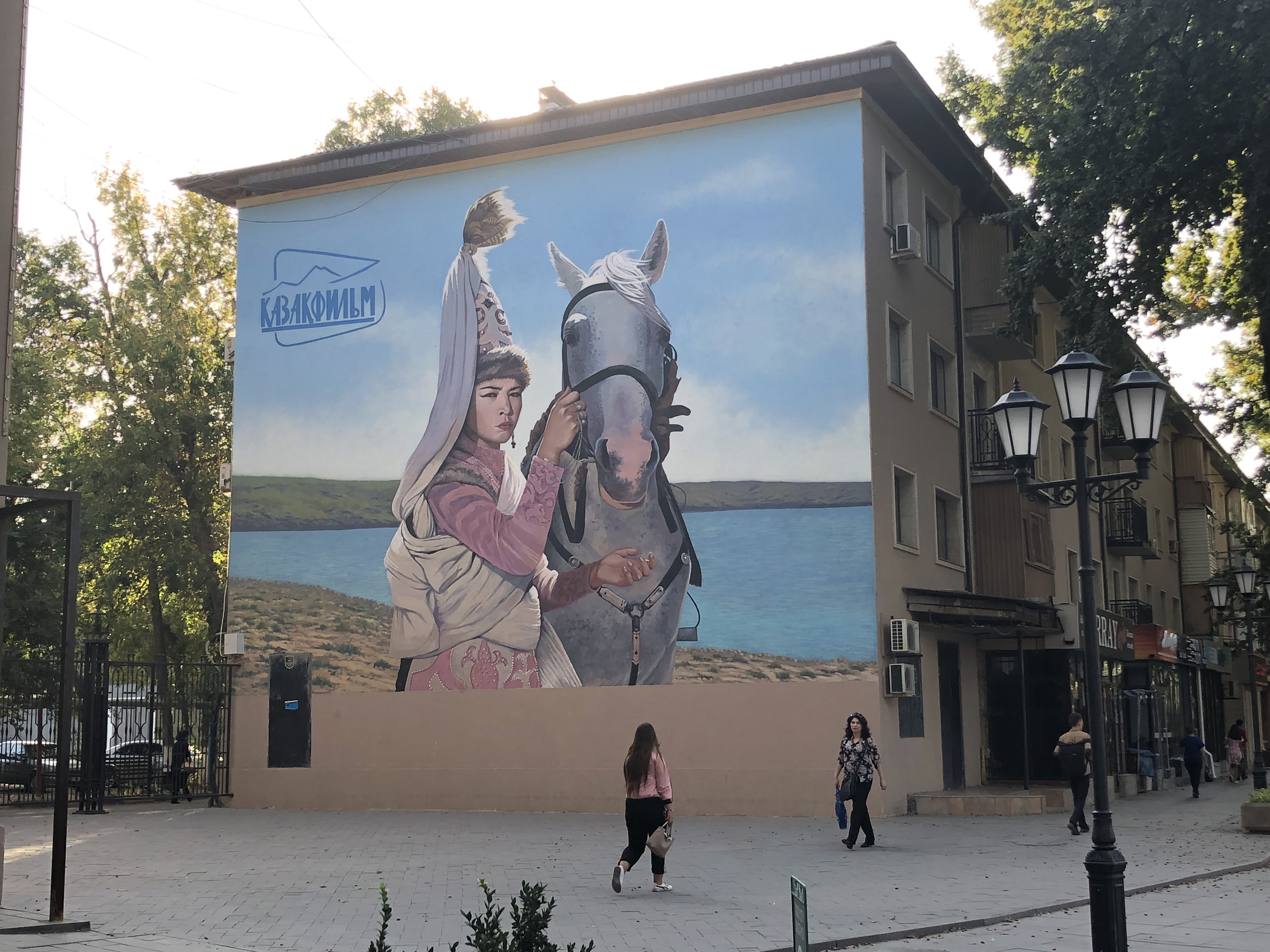
A mural in Shymkent featuring the actress in the 1970 film, Meruert Utekeshova

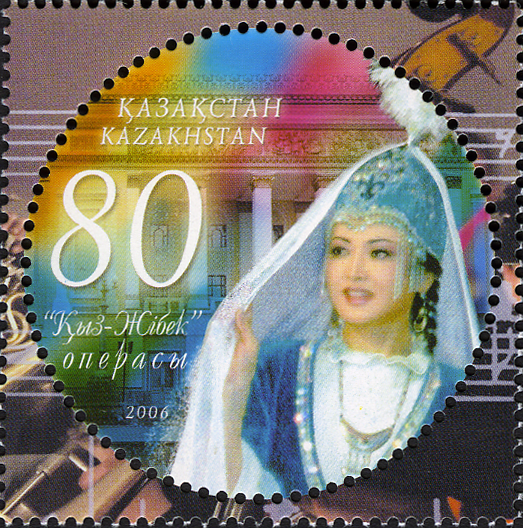
A 2006 stamp dedicated to the 1934 opera

Kyz-Zhibek (Kazakh: Қыз Жібек, Qyz Jıbek, lit. 'the Beauty Jibek') is a Kazakh poetic folk legend of the 16th century, which tells about a love story happening in tumultuos times.

The love story of Tölegen, the brave warrior, and the beauty Jibek ends tragically because of inter-family strife. Tölegen is foully murdered by Bekejan (the batyr of the rival family), who earlier strived for the hand of Jibek. Jibek commits suicide after learning about the death of Tölegen.

The romantic epic, unfolding at the beginning of the 16th century, when the Kazakh Khanate was first formed from many steppe clans and tribes, was recorded in the 19th century. It was first published in Kazan in 1894 in a version prepared by a Kazakh ethnographer and poet Jüsipbek Shayhislamuly. Today, sixteen original epic versions are known.

The Kyz-Zhibek poem is included in the world cultural heritage list, 2008 was declared by UNESCO the year of its 500th anniversary. The anniversary was included in the UNESCO 2008 calendar of significant dates.

== Variants ==
In 1934, the opera "Kyz-Zhibek" was staged in the Abay Opera House. The music was done by Yevgeny Brusilovsky, and the libretto is attributed to Gabit Musirepov).

In 1970, Kazakhfilm made a film adaptation based on the legend.

In 1988, the poem was translated into Russian by Kazakh poet Bakhytzhan Kanapyanov.

In 2003, a book was published in the Eposes of the Peoples of Eurasia series, which collected the best versions of the two epics Qozy Körpesh – Bayan Sulu and Kyz-Zhibek.
