= I. Zhansugurov Literary Museum =

The I. Zhansugurov Literary Museum
- The I. Zhansugurov Literary Museum
- Location: 239 Abay Street; Taldykorgan, Almaty region Kazakhstan
- Coordinates: 45.01758°N 78.38440°E

The I. Zhansugurov Literary Museum in Taldykorgan is a center for the study of the poet Ilyas Zhansugurov. The museum is situated at 239 Abay Street, Taldykorgan city, Almaty region in Kazakhstan.

== Description ==
The museum was established in 1984 to celebrate the 90th anniversary of the poet's birth.

The main purpose of the museum is to collect, store and provide materials related to the life and literary activities of the poet. The museum organizes excursions and evenings in memory of the poet regularly. Its collection contains 6,073 items of scientific, auxiliary and museum significance. The fund contains manuscripts, photographs, books, personal belongings and the poet's study.

== Structure ==
The museum covers an area of 280.5 m^{2} (3,019 ft^{2}) and consists of six rooms, each of which is a thematic exhibition:

1. The poet's juvenile and adolescent years;
2. Formation, development, social activity of the poet;
3. The working room of the poet;
4. Creativity of Ilyas Zhansugurov;
5. The poet's legacy.

The building of the museum was constructed in 1907 and is a monument of architecture and urban planning, protected by the state.
