= Natalya Sats =

Russian stage director (1903–1993)

- Наталия Сац
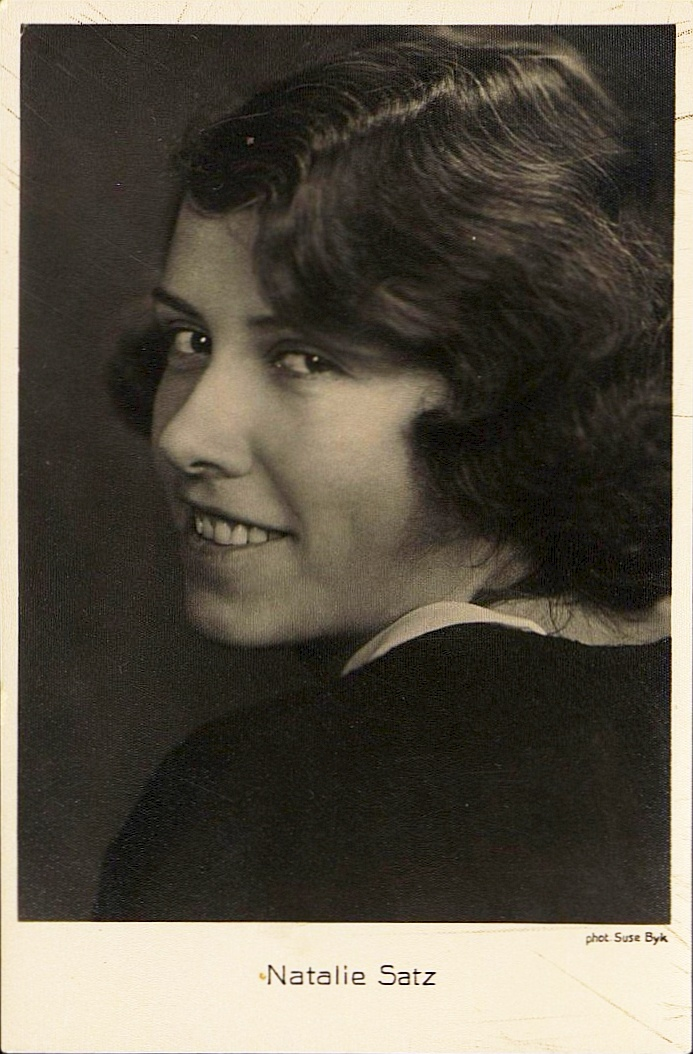
- Sats in 1920
- Born: 27 August [O.S. 14 August] 1903; Irkutsk, Russia
- Died: 18 December 1993 (aged 90); Moscow, Russia
- Burial place: Novodevichy Cemetery, Moscow

Natalya Ilyinichna Sats (Russian: Ната́лия Ильи́нична Сац; 27 August [O.S. 14 August] 1903 – 18 December 1993) was a Russian stage director who ran theaters for children for many years, including the Moscow Musical Theater for Children, now named after her. In 1937, she fell victim to Soviet repressions, but was rehabilitated in 1953. She was a recipient of the USSR State Prize, People's Artist of the USSR award, Lenin Prize, Hero of Socialist Labour medal, and the Lenin Komsomol Prize.

== Childhood ==
Natalya Sats was born in Irkutsk, Russia, where her father, Ilya Sats, was in political exile. Ilya Sats, a composer, grew up in a Jewish family. He was a friend and protégé of Leo Tolstoy. Natalya's mother, Anna Sats (née Shchastnaya), left home as a young woman to become a professional singer in Montpellier where she met Ilya Sats. When Ilya was exiled to Irkutsk, Anna followed him and soon gave birth to Natalya. The two were subsequently married. The family moved to Moscow in 1904, when Ilya Sats became music director of the Moscow Art Theatre (MAT). He died in October 1912.

== Theatre career ==
In the year of the Russian Revolution, Sats was a school girl, but she was well connected to the new Bolshevik regime through her uncle, Igor Sats, who was the secretary and brother-in-law of the Commissar of Education Anatoly Lunacharsky. At the age of 15, she was made head of the theatre and music section of the Department of Public Education of the Moscow Soviet, and organised a series of programmes for children, employing professional performers, musicians and circus acrobats, in 11 of Moscow's districts. In October 1918, she established one of the world's first dedicated theatres for children using professional performers, on Manonovsky Alley, Moscow.

Sats's theatre was visited by Lunacharsky, who proposed to start a theatre for children, subsidised by his department, under his chairmanship, with a six-member directorate that included Sats and MAT director Konstantin Stanislavski. The original Director of the First Children's Theatre, Henriette Pascar refused to accept the political demands placed on the theatre, and was sacked in 1923, after putting on a stage version of Treasure Island by Robert Louis Stevenson in which the British flag was raised on stage, and a toast drunk to the King. Meanwhile Sats and her new partner, Sergei Rozanov, by whom she had a son, Adrian, who accepted that theatre should serve the political interests of the soviet state, opened a new children's theatre, The Moscow Theatre for Children, in temporary headquarters. Here she established herself as a stage director and producer. She directed her first play in 1925, in the same year that she married the head of the Moscow soviet's finance department, Nikolai Popov, by whom she had a daughter, Roxana. She began to attract international attention. In 1931 conductor Otto Klemperer invited her to stage Mozart's The Marriage of Figaro in Buenos Aires, and Verdi's Falstaff in Berlin.

In February 1936, the Central Committee decided to open a new children's theatre, the Central Children's Theatre, on the premises of what had previously the Second Moscow Arts Theatre, close to the Bolshoi Theatre, with Sats as its first director. One of the first works she commissioned in this role was the Golden Key, by Alexei Tolstoy, which featured the puppet Buratino, who resembled Pinochio. It was first staged in December 1936.

In April 1936, having spotted the composer Sergei Prokofiev at a performance with his two young sons, Sats commissioned a work that was to change the history of performance for children. She wished to produce a play which would introduce children to the instruments of the orchestra, and she persuaded Prokofiev to compose Peter and the Wolf and worked closely with him on its creation, contributing many ideas to the libretto. Peter and the Wolf premiered at the Moscow Philharmonic on 2 May 1936. Due to illness, Sats was not able to attend this premiere, which according to Prokofiev was not a success. However, three days later, Sats narrated Peter and the Wolf at its first performance in the Moscow Theater for Children. This second performance proved a huge success and effectively launched the work. Peter and the Wolf, dedicated to Sats, went on to international success. It has been recorded over 400 times, and translated into many languages. Sats continued to narrate performances of Peter and the Wolf through the rest of her career.

In November 1936, she married Israel Veitser, the People's Commissar for Internal Trade, whom she had met during a trip to Berlin in 1931, when he was soviet trade representative there.

== Arrest and exile ==
Sats was arrested, during the Great Purge, on 21 August 1937, and taken first to Lubyanka prison and then to Butyrka prison. She refused to sign a confession, and in October was sentenced to five years at a gulag in Siberia. Various reasons have been given for her arrest, including a report that she was accused of being a "family member of a traitor to the Motherland", as the wife of Israel Veitser. However he was not arrested until ten weeks after her, on 3 November 1937, which makes it unlikely that he was the reason she was arrested. (He was shot in May 1938). Her daughter, Roxana, believed she was arrested for lending money to someone who had been declared an "enemy of the people."

The cause of her arrest most commonly accepted by professional historians of the period is that Sats had had an affair with Marshal Tukhachevsky, one of the greatest military heroes of the Russian Civil War and a serial womanizer, who was arrested and shot in June 1937, two months before Sats was arrested. In November 1937, she was moved a place of detention for wives of prominent 'traitors', where Tukhachevsky's widow was a fellow prisoner.

At the end of her five years of hard labor, she was not allowed to return to Moscow, but was exiled to Alma-Ata (now Almaty, Kazakhstan). There, in 1944, Sats wrote to the Central Committee about the necessity of a theater for children and young people in the city. A resolution of the Council of People's Commissars and Central Committee of Communist Party of Kazakhstan “On organization of the theater of young spectators in Alma-Ata” was adopted on September 6, 1944. On November 7, 1945, the theater opened with a production directed by Sats.

== Later life ==
After Stalin's death in 1953, Sats was fully rehabilitated and returned to Moscow in 1958. There she ran a touring theater for children. Eventually, with the support of influential colleagues, she was able to start a new theater for children in Moscow. In 1965, the Musical Theater for Children opened. Her theater company traveled the world, performing in many countries and languages.

In addition to working as a playwright, director and producer, Sats wrote three books, including an autobiography, Sketches from My Life, which was translated into English in 1985.

Sats died 18 December 1993, and was buried at the Novodevichy Cemetery in Moscow next to her father. The Musical Theater for Children and the State Theater for Children in Almaty were then renamed in her honor. Sats' daughter, Roksana Sats, continues her mother's work in the theater. On 14 September 2023, a memorial plaque was unveiled in Almaty in connection with the 120th anniversary of Natalya Sats' birth.

== Awards and honors ==
- Honored Artist of the RSFSR (1933)
- People's Artist of the RSFSR (1967)
- USSR State Prize (1972)
- Order of the Red Banner of Labour (1973)
- People's Artist of the USSR (1975)
- Order of Friendship of Peoples (1978)
- Lenin Prize (1982)
- Hero of Socialist Labour (1983)
- Order of Lenin (1983)
- Lenin Komsomol Prize (1985)
- Order of the October Revolution (1989)

== Sources ==
- Simon Morrison, The People's Artist, Oxford, Oxford University Press, 2009.
- Natalya Sats, Sketches from My Life , vol 1, 1984.
- Deborah Annette Wilson, Prokofiev's Romeo and Juliet: History of a Compromise, Doctoral Dissertation, The Ohio State University, 2003.
- Biography (in Russian)
- Peter & The Wolf [VHS], Proscenium Entertainment, released February 26, 1996.
