= Gabit Musirepov =

Kazakh Soviet writer

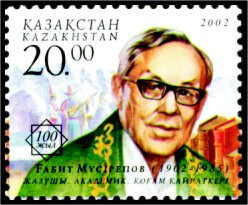
Stamp of Kazakhstan devoted to Gabit Musirepov, 2002 (Michel 400)

Gabit Makhmutuly Musirepov (Kazakh: Ğabit Mahmūtūly Müsırepov, Ғабит Махмұтұлы Мүсірепов; 22 March 1902 – 31 December 1985) was a Soviet Kazakh writer, playwright and author of libretto to Kazakh opera Kyz-Zhibek. He was named People's Writer of the Kazakh Soviet Socialist Republic, served as President of the Kazakhstan Writers' Union, and was a member of the Kazakhstan Academy of Sciences.

== Biography ==
Gabit Musirepov was born on 22 March 1902 in a village located in modern-day Kostanay Region, then belonging to the Russian Empire. Between 1923 and 1926, he studied at the Faculty of Workers in Orenburg, and then at the agroeconomic institute at Omsk. He started his literary career in 1925, writing his first story, To the Abyss (В пучине) in 1928, about events that occurred during the Russian Civil War. In 1928, he collaborated with the literary journal Jana-Adebiet (Жаңа Әдебиет). Among his works, Kyz-Zhibek (Қыз Жібек) stands out, the first libretto to a Kazakh opera, with music by Yevgeny Brusilovsky. Others include Poet's Tragedy (Трагедия поэта), written in 1958 (first version titled Ақан сері Ақтоқты, 1942), that dealt with the tragedy of Ajani, a Kazakh singer and composer of the 19th century.

He was President to the Writers' Union of Kazakhstan from 1956 to 1962 and from 1964 to 1966, Secretary of the Union of Soviet Writers (1959) and member of the 5th Convocation of the Supreme Soviet of the Soviet Union, deputy to the Supreme Soviet of the Kazakh Soviet Socialist Republic. He died on 31 December 1985, and was buried in the Kensai Cemetery.

== Legacy ==
The Gabit Musirepov District in northern Kazakhstan was named in his honor, as was the Kazakh State Academic Theater for Children and Youth. The Museum Complex of S. Mukanov and G. Musrepov is in Almaty was named after him as well.

== Works ==
=== Short stories ===
- Pair of Lakes (Қос шалқар, 1929)
- Urgent (Шұғыла, 1933)
- Stubby Nostril (Талпақ танау, 1933)

=== Novels ===
- Kazakh Soldier (Қазақ солдаты, 1949)
- The Awakening of the Region (Оянған өлке, 1953)
- Ulpan (Ұлпан, 1976)

=== Plays ===
- Kyz-Zhibek (Қыз Жібек, 1934), music by Yevgeny Brusilovsky
- Amangeldi (Амангелді, 1937)
- Kozy-Korpesh and Bayan-Sulu (Қозы Көрпеш Баян сұлу, 1939)
- Poet's Tragedy (Трагедия поэта, 1958)

== Bibliography ==
- Тулаған-Толқында, Казгиз, Kyzylorda, 1928
- Журнал «Жаңа-Әдебиет», 1928–1931
- Красноармейский букварь, Almaty, 1929–1930
- Букварь для малограмотных, Almaty, 1930
- Шығармалар жинағы, 5 томдық, т. 1–2, Almaty, 1972–1973
- Однажды и на всю жизнь. Избраные повести и рассказы, Almaty, 1968.

== Awards and honors ==
- Hero of Socialist Labour (1974)
- Three Orders of Lenin
- Two Orders of the Red Banner of Labour
- Order of Friendship of Peoples
- Order of the October Revolution
