= Academic theater =

Academic theater is an honorary title awarded to the biggest and oldest state theaters. Established in the Soviet Russia, it was adopted by the Soviet Union. Upon the dissolution of the Soviet Union the title was adopted by the former country members of the Union.

The title was established in 1919 and was given to six oldest theaters of the Soviet Union: Bolshoi Theatre, Maly Theatre, Moscow Art Theatre, Alexandrinsky Theatre, Mariinsky Theatre, and Mikhaylovsky Theatre. All academic theaters in 1920 were organized into one association that existed only for a year. During the 1920s, 1930s the number of theaters with the title increased significantly.
