= Natalya Sats Musical Theater =

- Московский государственный академический детский музыкальный театр имени Наталии Ильиничны Сац
- Type: Theatre group
- Location: 5 Prospekt Vernardskogo, Moscow
- Coordinates: 55°41′47″N 37°32′38″E
- Artistic director: Georgy Isaakyan
- Website: www.teatr-sats.ru

The Natalya Sats Musical Theater, formally known as the Moscow State Academic Children's Music Theater Named After Natalya Sats (Russian: Московский государственный академический детский музыкальный театр имени Наталии Ильиничны Сац), is a theater specializing in opera, ballet and dramatic productions for children. The world's first professional theater for children, it is perhaps best known internationally as the birthplace of Sergei Prokofiev's Peter and the Wolf.

== History ==
The theater that would come to be known as the Natalya Sats Musical Theater was opened in a former movie house as the "Moscow Children's Theater" in 1921.

It had its origins in a series of touring productions staged in 1918 by the Soviet Commissariat for Education. Prior to this time, few adult actors specialized in children's roles, but after the October Revolution Lenin's wife, Nadezhda Krupskaya began to champion theater for children. She was joined by actor Constantin Stanislavski. Natalya Sats, the 15-year-old daughter of Moscow Art Theatre Composer Ilya Sats, was called on to direct performances in Petrograd, Saratov and Moscow.

The first performance Sats organized, "David," was staged in June 1918 and 350 children attended. The Moscow venture evolved into The First State Children's Theater.

In 1936, the troupe moved out of the former movie house into a large theater on Sverdlov Square near the Bolshoi Theater. At this time the Soviet government changed the troupe's name to "Central Children's Theater." Here Sats pioneered a combination of music, dance, acrobatics, drama and multimedia. Known as "synthesized theater," it has become the dominant style of children's theater.

Natalya Sats directorship was cut short in 1937. Sats was condemned as the mistress of Marshal Mikhail Tukhachevsky, one of the eight top Red Army commanders purged by Stalin in 1937. The attendance of the American ambassador at a performance also contributed to her arrest. She spent the next five years in Siberian labor camps. Her name was not cleared until two years after Joseph Stalin's death.

"It was her strong will, courage and innate feeling of dignity that helped her to survive through all the hardships," the Itar-Tass news agency wrote in 1993, when reporting on the theater pioneer's death at the age of 90.

The theatre that bears her name was founded in 1965, and developed a strong repertoire from close work with contemporary composers. Sats' ambition was both to create new productions specifically aimed at a younger audience, and to present the classics in a way that made them accessible to children.

In 1979, the Children's Musical Theater moved into the Palace of Children's Opera, which was designed especially for the company.

== Peter and the Wolf ==
In 1936, Natalya Sats asked Sergei Prokofiev to write a work that would teach orchestral instruments to children and fit the "musical tastes in children from the first years of school." The composer, who had recently returned to Russia after 13 years abroad, wrote his symphonic fairy tale in a couple of weeks.

The first performance of Peter and the Wolf was on May 2, 1936; Prokofiev later wrote that the debut was "inauspicious at best" and the work "failed to attract much attention."

Yet although it is generally not considered among Prokofiev's greatest compositions, it has become one of the most frequently recorded classical work. To date there have been more than 400 different recordings in more than a dozen languages.

Natalya Sats first narrated Peter and the Wolf in 1936. She would go on to give more than 300 performances. The first time she narrated it in English was in Albany, New York as part of a 1986 cultural exchange of theater troupes.

Eleanor Roosevelt, David Bowie, Sir Alec Guinness, Sophia Loren, Zero Mostel, and Boris Karloff have all recorded narrations of Peter and the Wolf.

== The Theater Today ==
The Natalya Sats Children's Musical Theater, built in 1979, was designed with children's audiences in mind. The building houses a large 1100-seat theater and a concert hall with 300 seats. On the roof is a "bluebird of happiness," the theater's symbol. The exterior combines elements of a medieval castle and modern design: the portals are adorned with sculptures depicting characters from various fairy tales. Special criers herald the beginning of performances from balconies under the portals. Inside, costumed characters entertain children before the show. Real birds sing in the aviary, decorative fish swim in aquariums, and there is a special mural room painted in story-book style.,

The theater now stages approximately 30 operas and ballets a year. Its repertoire today reflects Sats educational philosophy and, alongside new versions of fairytales such as Puss in Boots, Snow White and The Frog Princess, there are also productions of “adult” operas like Madama Butterfly and Eugene Onegin and new ballets like the Snow Maiden. The company employs many young artists, and has served as a springboard for many artist's careers.,
