= Gabiden Mustafin =

Kazakh author and senior official in the Communist Party of Kazakhstan

- Ғабиден Мұстафин
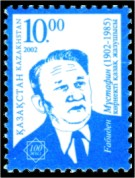
- Postage stamp depicting Gabiden Mustafin (2002)
- Born: November 26, 1902; Akmolinsk Oblast, Steppes-krai, Russian Empire
- Died: January 20, 1985 (aged 82); Alma-Ata, Kazakh SSR
- Occupation: Writer

Gabiden Mustafin (Kazakh: Ғабиден Мұстафин, Ğabiden Mūstafin; 26 November 1902, Bukhar-Zhyrau District – 20 January 1985, Almaty) was a Soviet and Kazakh writer and a senior official in the Communist Party of Kazakhstan.
