= Abai District, Abai Region =

Coordinates: 48.944°N 79.266°E

Abai Abai audany
- District
- Абай ауданы
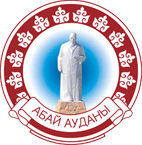
- Coat of arms

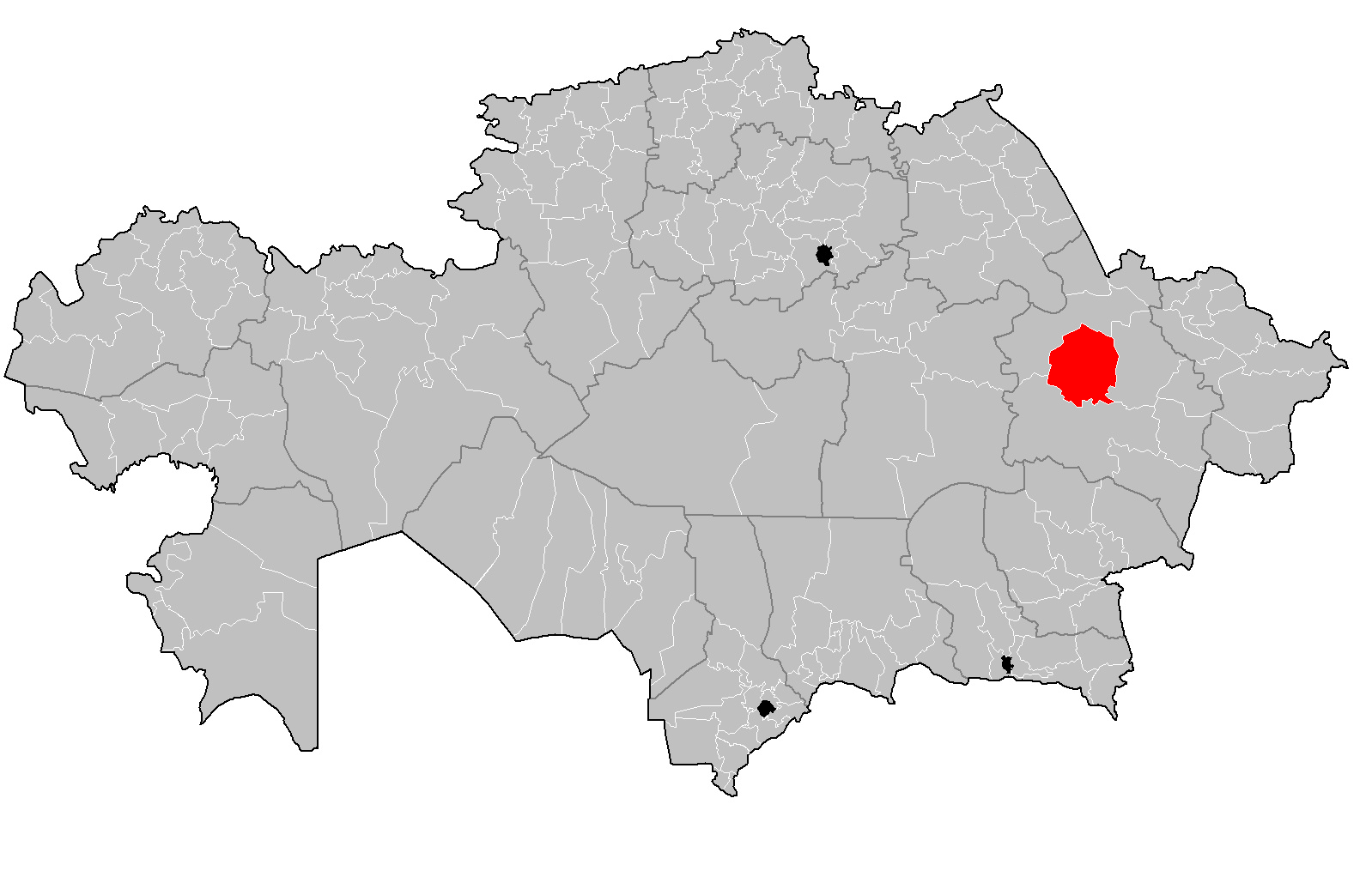
- Country: Kazakhstan
- Region: Abai Region
- Administrative center: Karaul
- Founded: 1928

Government
  - Akim: Smagulov Meirzhan

Area
  - Total: 20,093 km^{2} (7,758 sq mi)

Population (2013)
  - Total: 15,228
- Time zone: UTC+6 (East)

Abai (Kazakh: Абай ауданы, Abai audany, اباي اۋدانى) is a district of Abai Region, eastern Kazakhstan. The administrative center of the district is the selo of Karaul. It was created in 1997. Population: 15,228 (2013 estimate); 15,258 (2009 census results); 17,885 (1999 census results).

The district is 6.5 sq. km.
