= Writers' Union of Kazakhstan =

The Writers' Union of Kazakhstan (Kazakh: Qаzаqstаn Jаzuşylar Odаğy, Russian: Союз писателей Казахстана) is a Kazakh literary organisation, established in the 1930s. Since its inception, at least 750 of Kazakhstan's top writers have been affiliated with the union.

== Presidents ==
- Säken Seifullin, 1925–1929, founder
- İlias Jansügırov, 1932–1935
- Ğabbas Toğjanov, 1935–1936
- Säbit Mūqanov, 1936–1937, 1943–1951
- Mūhamedjan Qarataev, 1937–1938
- Dihan Äbılev, 1938–1939
- Äbdılda Täjıbaev, 1939–1943
- Äbdırahim Jaimurzin, 1951–1953
- Ğabiden Mūstafin, 1953–1956, 1962–1964
- Ğabit Mūsırepov, 1956–1962, 1964–1966
- Ädi Şärıpov, 1966–1971
- Änuar Älımjanov, 1971–1979
- Jūban Moldağaliev, 1979–1983
- Oljas Süleimenov, 1983–1991
- Qaldarbek Naimanbaiev, 1991–1996
- Nūrlan Orazalin, 1996–2018
- Ūlyqbek Esdäulet, 2018–present
