= Abai Qunanbaiuly =

Kazakh poet and composer (1845–1904)

Abaĭ Qūnanbaiūly
- Абай Құнанбайұлы
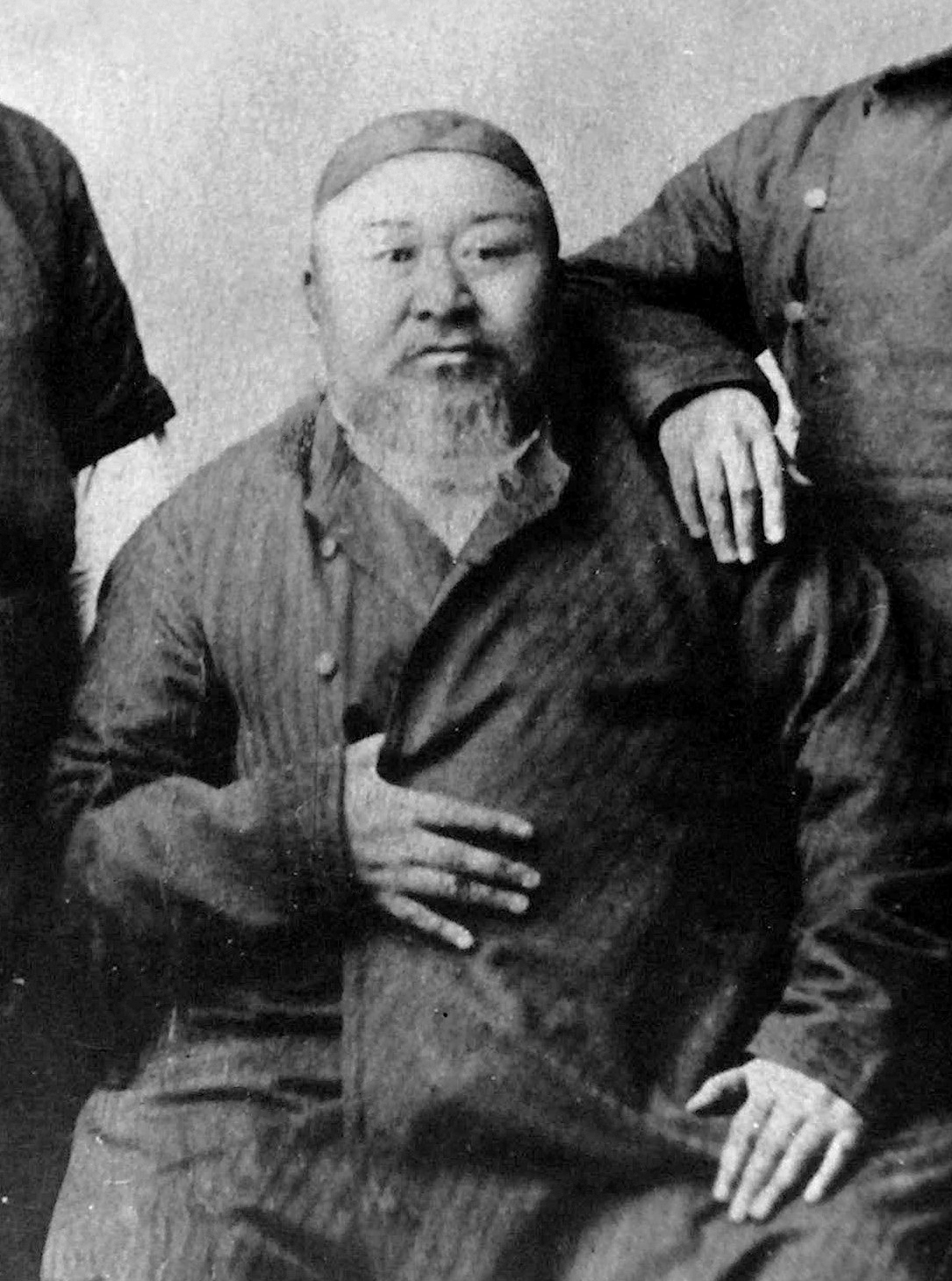

Personal life
- Born: Ibrahim Qunanbaiuly (Ибраһим Құнанбайұлы); 10 August 1845 Karauyl, Semipalatinsk uyezd, Russian Empire (present-day Abai District, Abai Region, Kazakhstan)
- Died: 6 July 1904 (23 June O.S.) Semipalatinsk Oblast, Russian Empire (present-day Abai Region, Kazakhstan)
- Resting place: Zhidebai, Abai District, Abai Region, Kazakhstan
- Home town: Karauyl, Semipalatinsk
- Spouse: Dilda, Shukiman (Aigerim), Erkejan
- Children: 10, including Akylbai, Abdirakhman, Magauiya, Turagul, Mekayyl, Izkail and Kenzhe
- Era: 19th century
- Region: Kazakh Steppe, Russian Empire
- Main interest(s): Islamic philosophy, ethics, theology, education, social reform, poetry, music
- Notable idea(s): Moral self-cultivation, education, knowledge, justice, ethical reform
- Notable work(s): Qara Sozder (The Book of Words), Masgut, Iskander, Azim Angimesi, Zhaz (Summer), Kuz (Autumn), Kys (Winter), Segiz Ayaq, Kazakh adaptations of Pushkin's Eugene Onegin, poems by Lermontov, and fables by Krylov
- Other names: Abai, Abay Kunanbayev (Russian transliteration), Abai Ibrahim Qunanbaiuly
- Occupation: Aqyn, poet, composer, philosopher, educator, translator, Islamic thinker, public figure

Religious life
- Religion: Islam
- Denomination: Sunni
- Jurisprudence: Hanafi
- Creed: Maturidi

Muslim leader
- Teacher: Mullah Gabitkhan, Akhmet Riza
- Students: Shakarim Qudayberdiuli
- Influenced by: Nizami Ganjavi, Saadi Shirazi, Hafez, Alisher Navoi, Fuzuli, Jami, Alexander Pushkin, Mikhail Lermontov, Ivan Krylov, Johann Wolfgang von Goethe, Lord Byron, Leo Tolstoy, Fyodor Dostoevsky
- Influenced: Shakarim Qudayberdiuli, Alash Orda, modern Kazakh written literature and Kazakh intellectual thought

Abai Qūnanbaiūly (Note: Kazakh: Абай Құнанбайұлы [ɑˈbɑj qʊnɑmˌbɑjʊˈɫɤ]; Russian: Абай Кунанбаев, also known mononymously as Abai; born Ibrahim Qunanbaiuly) (10 August [O.S. 29 July] 1845 – 6 July [O.S. 23 June] 1904) was a Kazakh poet, composer and Hanafi Maturidi theologian philosopher.

Abai was a cultural reformer toward European and Russian cultures on the basis of enlightened Islam. His name is also transliterated as Abay Kunanbayev (from Russian: Абай Кунанбаев). Among Kazakhs, he is known mononymously as Abai.

== Early life and education ==
Abai was born in Karauyl village in Chingiz volost of Semipalatinsk uyezd of the Russian Empire (this is now in Abay District of Abai Region, Kazakhstan). He was the son of Qunanbai and Uljan, his father's second wife. They named him Ibrahim, as the family was Muslim, and he lived with the name for the first few years of his life.

Ibrahim first studied at a local madrasah under Mullah Ahmed Ryza. During his early childhood years in Ryza's tutelage, he received the nickname "Abai" (which means "careful"), a nickname that stayed with him for the rest of his life. His father was wealthy enough to send Abai to a Russian secondary school in Semipalatinsk. There he read the writings of Mikhail Lermontov and Alexander Pushkin, which were influential to his own development as a writer. Moreover, he was fond of reading eastern poetry, including the Shahnameh and One Thousand and One Nights.

== Contributions ==
Abai's main contribution to Kazakh culture and folklore lies in his poetry, which expresses great nationalism and grew out of Kazakh folk culture. Before him, most Kazakh poetry was oral, echoing the nomadic habits of the people of the Kazakh steppes. During Abai's lifetime, however, a number of important socio-political and socio-economic changes occurred. Influence continued to grow in Kazakhstan, resulting in greater educational possibilities as well as exposure to a number of different philosophies, whether Russian, Western or Asian. Abai Qunanbaiuly steeped himself in the cultural and philosophical history of these newly opened geographies. In this sense, Abai's creative poetry affected the philosophical theological thinking of educated Kazakhs.

In 1885, American journalist and explorer George Kennan visited Semey (then Semipalatinsk) and was deeply impressed by the city's public library. To his surprise, local Kazakhs actively borrowed and read books, a rare sight for that time and region. In his influential work Siberia and the Exile System, Kennan specifically mentioned Abai, marking one of the earliest references to the Kazakh thinker in Western literature.

== Legacy ==
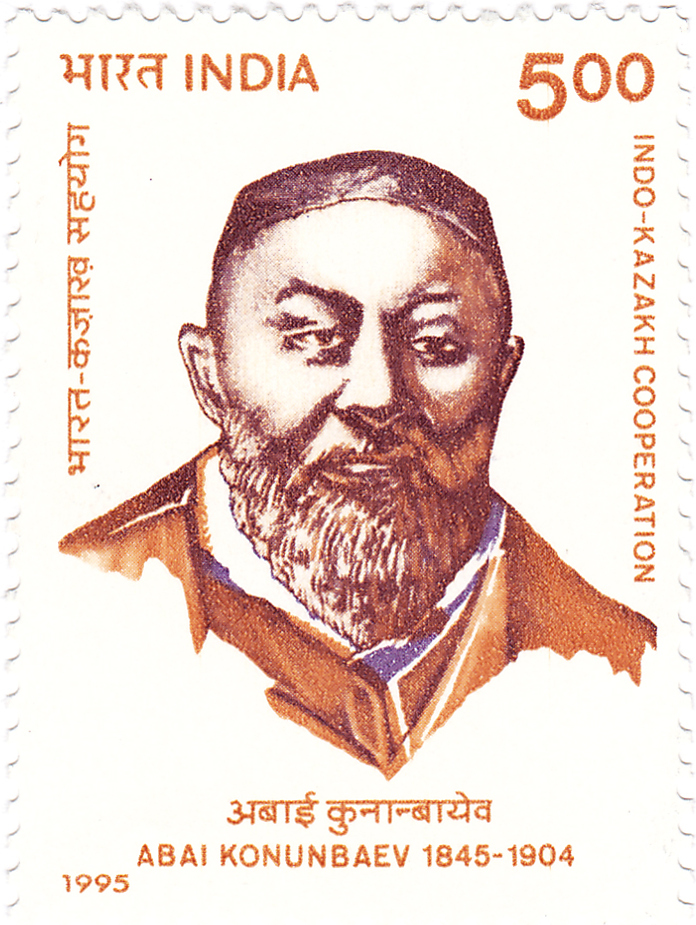
Abai Qunanbaiuly on a 1995 Indian Postage stamp

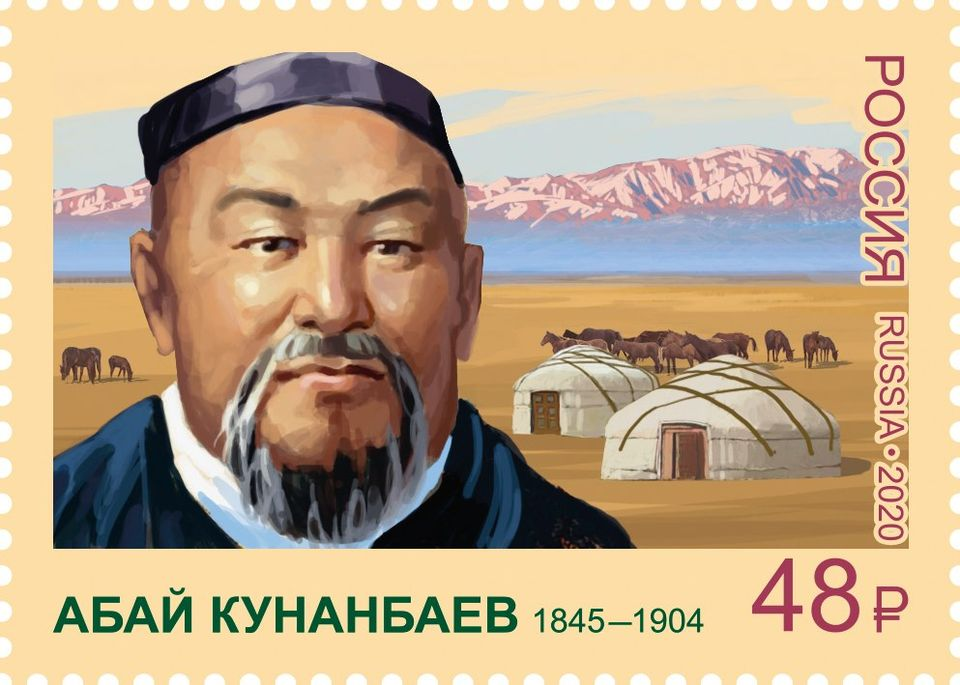
Abai on a 2020 Russian stamp

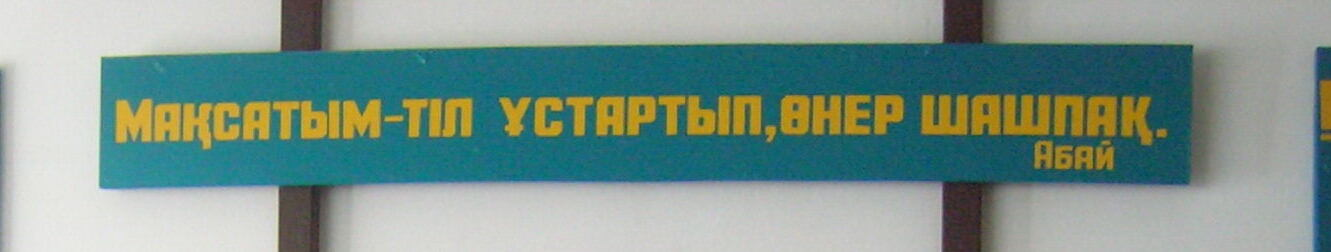
Abai's quote is displayed at a school in West Kazakhstan Region, 2008

The leaders of the Alash Orda movement saw him as their inspiration and spiritual predecessor.

Contemporary Kazakh images of Abai generally depict him in full traditional dress holding a dombra (the Kazakh national instrument). Today, Kazakhs revere Abai as one of the first folk heroes to enter into the national consciousness of his people. Kazakh National Pedagogical University is named after Abai, so is one of the main avenues in the city of Almaty. There are also public schools with his name. Abai is featured on postal stamps of Kazakhstan, Soviet Union, and India. The Kazakh city of Abay and the Abai Region are named after him. Among Abai's students was his nephew, a historian, philosopher, and poet Shakarim Qudayberdiuli (1858–1931).

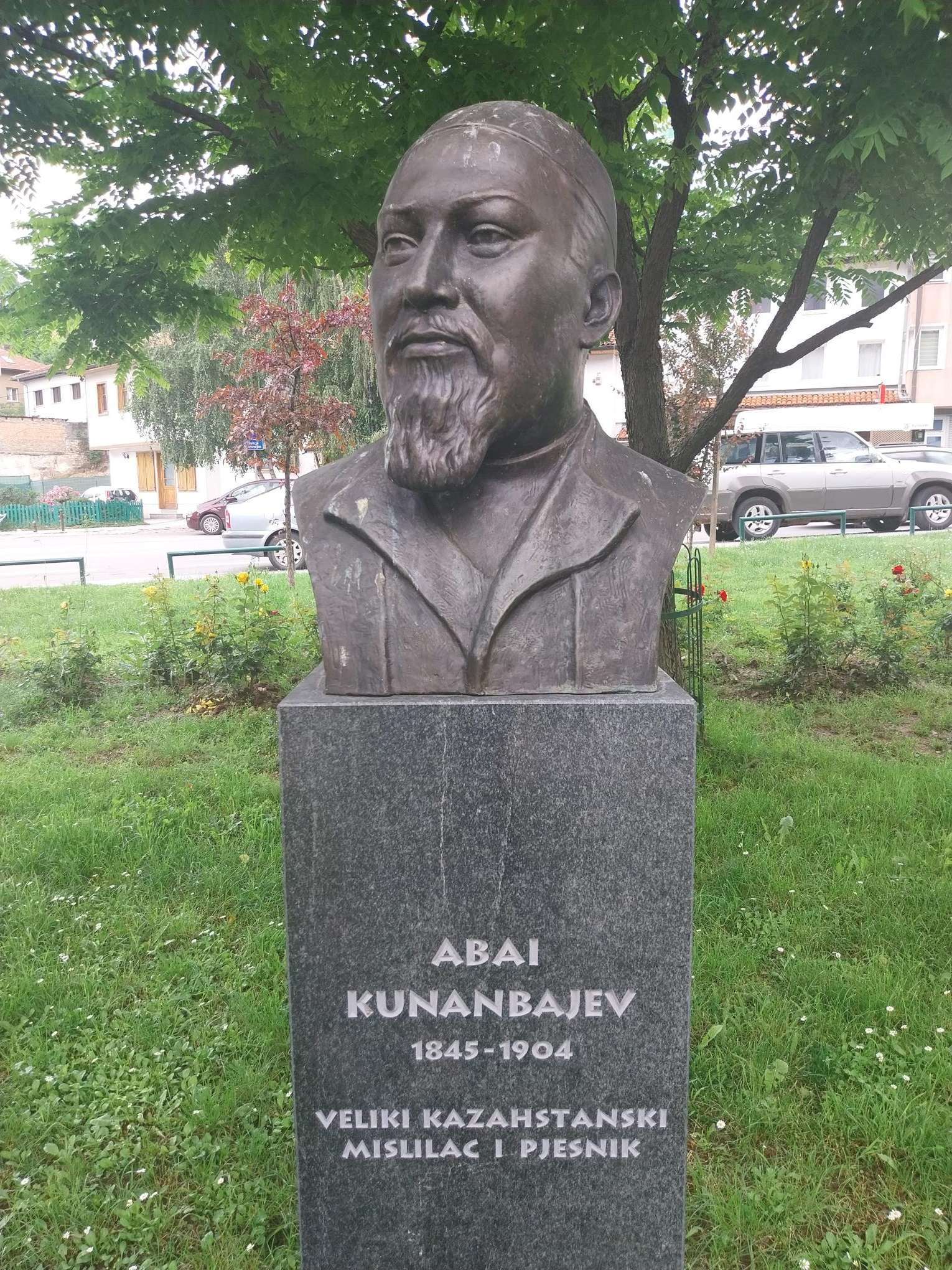
Statue to Abai Qunanbaiuly in Sarajevo, Bosnia and Herzegovina

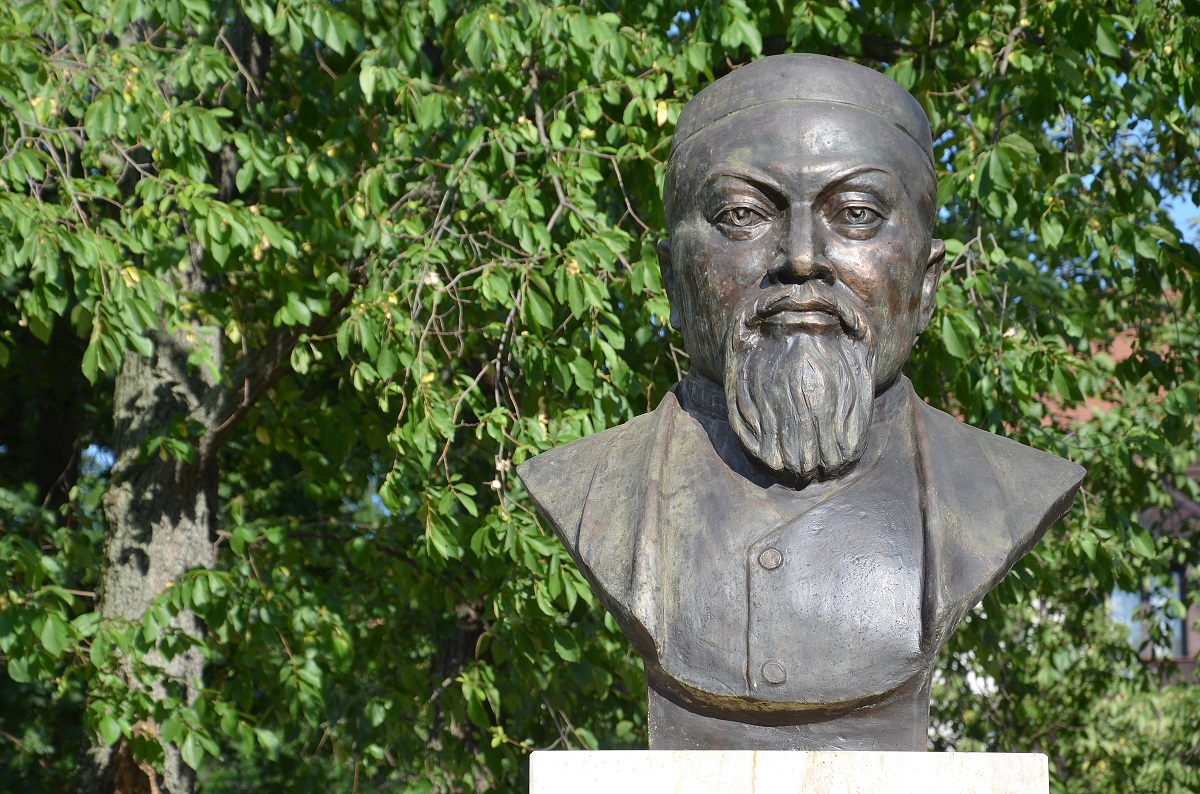
Statue of Abai Qunanbaiuly in Budapest, Hungary

Statues of him have been erected in many cities of Kazakhstan, as well as Ashgabat, Beijing, Moscow, New Delhi, Tehran, Berlin, Cairo, Istanbul, Antalya, Kyiv, Tashkent, Sarajevo, Bucharest and Budapest.

Abai is featured on the Kazakhstani Tenge, a subway station in Almaty is named after him, along with a street, a square, a theater, and many schools. In 1995, the 150th anniversary of Abai's birth, UNESCO celebrated it with the "Year of Abai" event. A film on the life of Abai was made by Kazakhfilm in 1995, titled Abai. He is also the subject of two novels and an opera by Mukhtar Auezov, another Kazakhstani writer. Another film describing his father's life was made in December 2015, titled "Qunanbai". In 2016, Qunanbai film has been selected for the 12th Kazan International Muslim Film Festival. Only 60 of 700 applied films from countries passed the official selection. In 2016, Abai Qunanbaiuly was chosen as one of the nominees in the "proposed candidates" category of the national project «El Tulgasy» (Name of the Motherland) The idea of the project was to select the most significant and famous citizens of Kazakhstan whose names are now associated with the achievements of the country. More than 350,000 people voted in this project, and Abai was voted into fifth place in his category.

In 1995, Şair Abay Konanbay (English: Poet Abay Konanbay) Anatolian High School was opened in Sultangazi, Istanbul.

In 2020, the government of Kazakhstan announced plans to celebrate the 175th anniversary of his birthday throughout the year. The same year, the Park and memorial plaque in honor of Abai opened in Antalya, Turkey.

In 2021, Abay Kunanbayoğlu Square was opened in Zeytinburnu, Istanbul. The same year, a monument to Abai opened in Seoul, South Korea, and Kazakh President Kassym-Jomart Tokayev took part in the opening ceremony. A monument dedicated to Abai was unveiled in Berlin, Germany. Another monument was unveiled in Paris, France, as part of a celebration of the 30th anniversary of Kazakhstan's independence, as well as in Atyrau in front of the center of Abai.

In 2022, a monument was opened in Tbilisi; the avenue next to the square where the monument was erected will also bear the name of Abay Kunanbayev. The same year, a monument dedicated to the friendly relations between Kazakhstan and Kyrgyzstan was unveiled in Bishkek. A bust of Abai was installed in San Martin Square in New Delhi.

On 21 March 2023, a monument to Abai Kunanbayev was unveiled in Taldykorgan. The architects of the monument is Akmyrza Rustembekov and Manarbek Dzhakipbayev. The sculptor is Mirlan Azmaganbetov.

== Works ==
Abai also translated into Kazakh the works of Russian and European authors, mostly for the first time. Translations made by him include poems by Mikhail Lermontov, Johann Wolfgang von Goethe, Lord Byron, Ivan Krylov's Fables and Alexander Pushkin's Eugene Onegin.

Abai's major work is The Book of Words (қара сөздер, Qara sözder), a theological philosophic treatise and collection of poems where he encourages his fellow Kazakhs to embrace education, literacy, and good moral character in order to escape poverty, enslavement and corruption. In Word Twenty Five, he discusses the importance of Russian culture, as a way for Kazakhs to be exposed to the world's cultural treasures.

== In popular culture ==
=== 2012 Moscow protests ===
On 9 May 2012, after two days of protests in Moscow following Vladimir Putin's third inauguration as President of Russia, protesters set up camp near the monument to Abai on the Chistoprudny Boulevard in central Moscow, close to the embassy of Kazakhstan. The statue quickly became a reference point for the protest's participants. OccupyAbai was among the top ranking hashtags on Twitter for several days thanks to Russian opposition leader Alexei Navalny who set up a meeting with his followers next to Abai Qunanbaiuly's monument in Moscow that he called "a monument to some unknown Kazakh". This comment later led to much controversy. This also brought Abai's poetry into the top 10 AppStore downloads.

=== Filmography ===
Abai and his works have been featured numerous times in Kazakh cinema. Film expert Dana Ämırbekova compiled the movies dedicated to Abai in a list, and it included Abai's Poems (1945) by Grigori Roshal, Abai (1995) by Ardaq Ämırqūlov, and Qūnanbai (2015) by Doshan Joljaqsynov. In 2020, the Abai series were released on the Qazaqstan TV channel and the Abai joly series were released on the Khabar channel.
