= Aksu District, Jetisu Region =

Coordinates: 45°23′19″N 79°30′08″E

Aksu
- District
- Ақсу ауданы
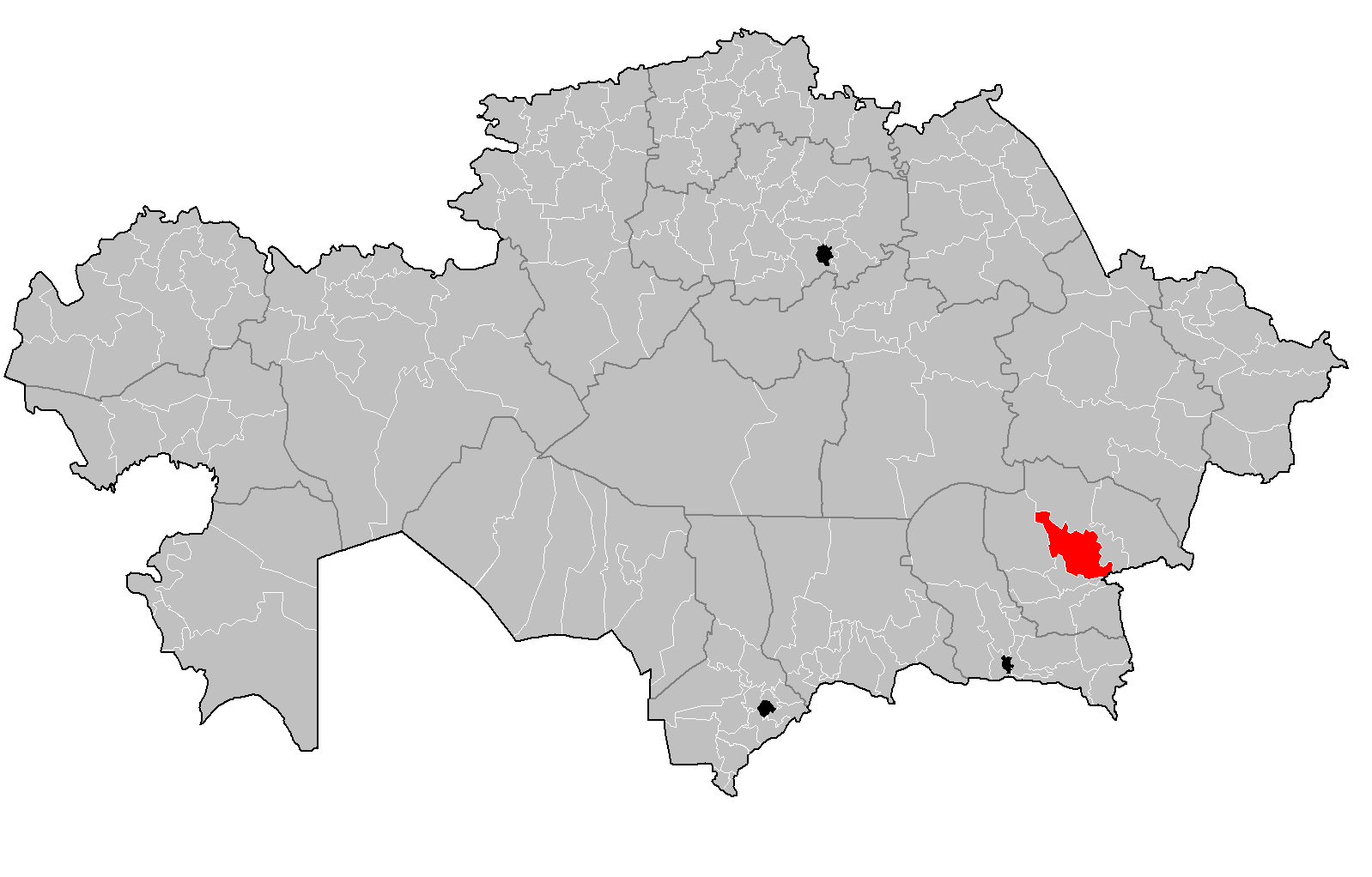
- Country: Kazakhstan
- Region: Jetisu Region
- Administrative center: Zhansugirov
- Founded: 1930

Government
  - Akim (mayor): Bazarkhanov Yesim Seylkhanovich

Population (2013)
  - Total: 40,242
- Time zone: UTC+6 (East)

Aksu District (Kazakh: Ақсу ауданы, Aqsu audany) is a district of Jetisu Region in Kazakhstan. The administrative center of the district is the settlement of Zhansugirov. The population of the district according to the 2013 estimate is 40,242. Asku District has 3 villages, 54 settlements, and 15 rural districts, held within a size of 4864.9 mi² (12 600 km²).

Part of the district borders Lake Balkhash, and partly occupies Lake Alakol, and the Zhetysu Alatau.
