= Gauez Nurmukhambetov =

Kazakh politician (born 1968)

Ğauez Nūrmūhambetov
- Ғауез Нұрмұхамбетов
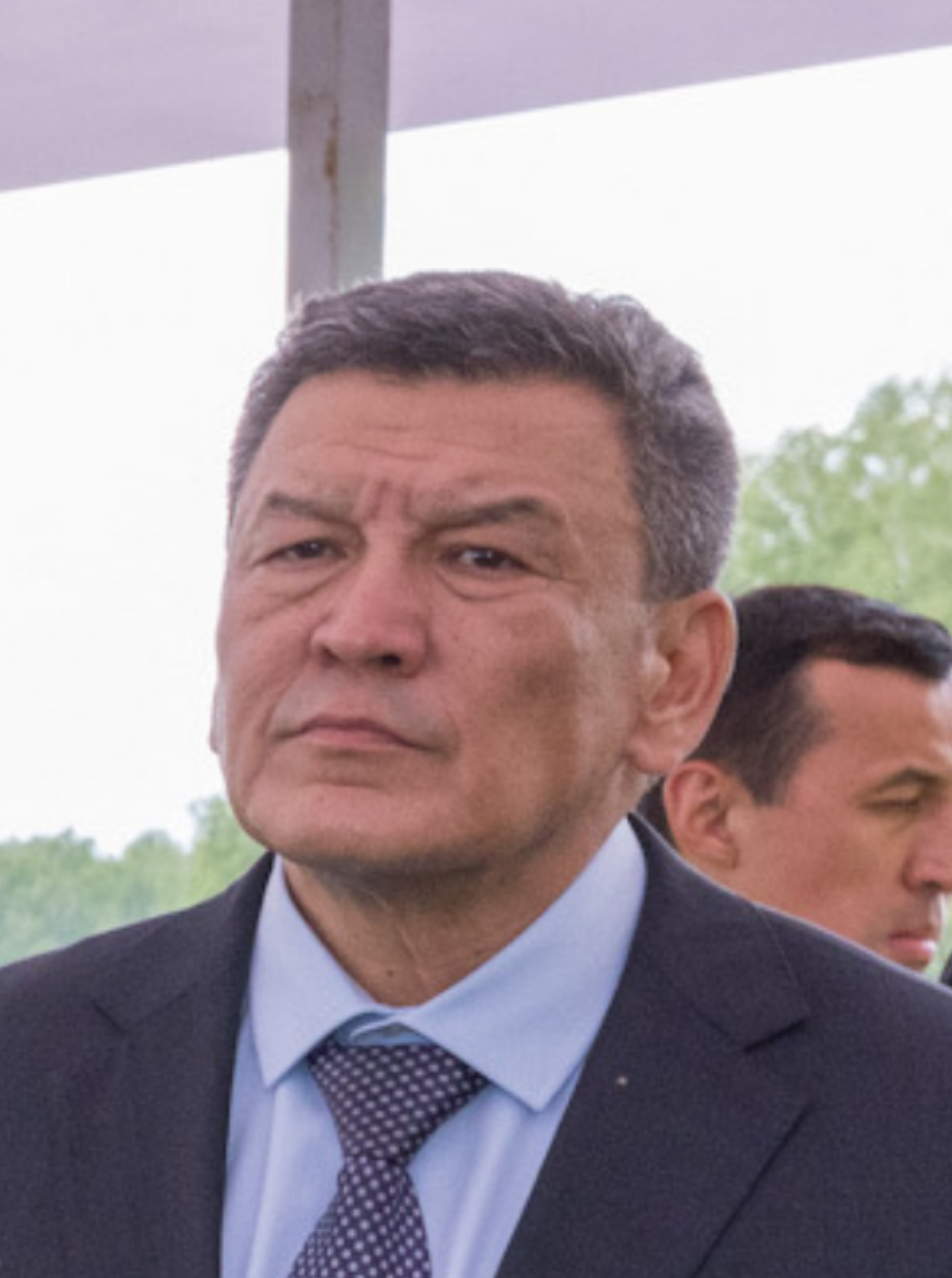
- Nūrmūhambetov in 2024

Akim of North Kazakhstan Region
- Incumbent
- Assumed office 23 September 2023
- President: Kassym-Jomart Tokayev
- Preceded by: Aidarbek Saparov

Senator from Kostanay Region
- In office 25 January 2023 – 25 September 2023 Serving with Sergey Karplyuk
- Preceded by: Jenis Nurgaliev
- Succeeded by: Bibigul Akkuzhina

Akim of Kostanay city
- In office 13 February 2012 – 13 June 2014
- President: Nursultan Nazarbayev
- Preceded by: Jomart Nurgaliyev
- Succeeded by: Ahmedbek Akhmetzhanov
- In office 14 January 2008 – 4 February 2009
- President: Nursultan Nazarbayev
- Preceded by: Jenis Nurgaliev
- Succeeded by: Jomart Nurgaliyev

Personal details
- Born: 11 July 1968 (age 58) May, Karasu, Kostanay Region, Kazakh SSR, Soviet Union
- Education: Kazakh Agrotechnical University; Chelyabinsk State University; Kostanay Engineering and Economic University
- Awards: Astana Medal; Medal for Distinguished Labor; Medal "10 years of Astana"; Order of Parasat

Ğauez Torsanūly Nūrmūhambetov (Note: Often transliterated as Gauez Torsanovich Nurmukhambetov through a Russified Romanization of Гауез Торсанович Нурмухамбетов.) (Kazakh: Ғауез Торсанұлы Нұрмұхамбетов; born 11 July 1968) is a Kazakh lawyer and manager serving as the akim of North Kazakhstan Region since 2023. Previously, he served as the member of the Senate from January to September 2023.

== Early life and education ==
Nūrmūhambetov was born on 11 July 1968, in May, a village in Karasu District, Kostanay Region, Kazakh Soviet Socialist Republic, Soviet Union (now Kazakhstan).

In 1992, Nurmukhambetov graduated from the Tselinograd Agricultural Institute (now Kazakh Agrotechnical University) with a degree in agronomy. He studied at the Chelyabinsk State University, received a law degree in 2002, and earned a degree in economics from the Kostanay Engineering and Economic University in 2009.

In 2004, he successfully defended his Candidate of Sciences (PhD-equivalent) dissertation, titled “Organizational and Economic Foundations for the Development of Grain Market Infrastructure (Based on Materials from Kostanay Region),” and was awarded the degree of Candidate of Economic Sciences.

== Early career ==
Nurmukhambetov began his working life at age 17 in 1985, serving in Brigade No. 1 of the Magnaysky sovkhoz in the Komsomolsky District (now Karabalyk District) of his native region.

After graduating in 1992, from the Tselinograd Agricultural Institute, he worked as chief agronomist at the Vil’yams sovkhoz in the Oktjabrsky District (now Karasu District) in Torgay Region, and in 1994, held the same position at the Moskovsky sovkhoz in Kostanay District.

From 1996 to 1997 he returned to Komsomolsky District and served as executive director of the municipal enterprise “Boskolskoe”.

== Political career ==
In 1997, he was appointed akim (governor) of Taranovsky District (now Beimbet Mailin District) by decree of the Kostanay regional akim Toktarbai Kadambaev, marking the start of Nurmukhambetov's political career. In 2002, he was appointed akim of Karabalyk District by regional akim Umirzak Shukeyev.

On 14 January 2008, with the approval of the city maslihat and by decree of regional akim Sergey Kulagin, Nurmukhambetov was appointed akim of Kostanay city, the regional centre. On 4 February 2009, at 9:00 am Kulagin announced Nurmukhambetov's dismissal; according to Kulagin, he had requested to resign since August 2008 for health reasons.

After that, from 2009 to 2011 he worked in the private sector, deputy director of Sodrugestvo LLP. On 15 June 2011, by decree of regional akim Kulagin, Nurmukhambetov was appointed akim of Auliekol District. On 13 February 2012, he returned to his previous post as akim of Kostanay city by decree of a different regional akim, Nuraly Saduaqasov, the same position he had left earlier for health reasons.

On 13 June 2014, Saduaqasov announced that an order had been issued appointing Nurmukhambetov, from June 16, as a state inspector in the Department of State Control of the Presidential Administration, and that he was relieved of his akim duties with immediate effect.

After a year in the Presidential Administration, on May 2015, Nurmukhambetov returned to Kostanay Region as first deputy akim.

=== Senate ===
On 16 January 2023, Nurmukhambetov was elected to the Senate from Kostanay Region, receiving 83.1% of the vote the Central Election Commission formalized the result in Resolution No. 12/662 and on January 25, he was registered as a member of Senate. His powers as first deputy akim were terminated the same day. During his tenure in that office he had served under three regional akims: Saduaqasov, Arkhimed Mukhametov and Kumar Aksakalov.

=== Akim of North Kazakhstan Region ===
After 4 September 2023, when akim of North Kazakhstan Region Aidarbek Saparov was appointed agriculture minister, the post remained vacant until September 23. On that same day, president Kassym-Jomart Tokayev proposed Nurmukhambetov and deputy akim of North Kazakhstan Region Satjan Ablaliev for the post of akim of North Kazakhstan Region. In an open vote attended by 174 members, Nurmukhambetov received 118 votes while Ablaliev received 56. After winning the vote by Tokayev's decree No. 356 Nurmukhambetov appointed 11th akim of North Kazakhstan Region. On September 25, his parliamentary mandate was terminated by resolution No. 88/789.

== Personal life ==
Nurmukhambetov is married and sources report that they have three or four children and also has grandchildren.

His sister, Roza Nurmukhambetova holds a Candidate of Biological Sciences degree and teaches at the Kazakh Agrarian Technical University, where Gauez Nurmukhambetov also once studied. His other sister, Saule Nurmukhambetova also holds a Candidate of Biological Sciences degree and, together with her husband, has lived in Baltimore since the 1990s.

== Awards ==
- Astana Medal (1999)
- Medal "10 Years of Independence of the Republic of Kazakhstan" (2001)
- Medal for Distinguished Labor (2004)
- Medal "10 Years of Constitution of the Republic of Kazakhstan" (2005)
- Medal “50 years of Virgin Lands” (2005)
- Medal "10 years of Astana" (2008)
- Medal "20 Years of Independence of the Republic of Kazakhstan" (2011)
- Order of Parasat (2011)
