= Urkash (village) =

Urkash Орқаш
- Village
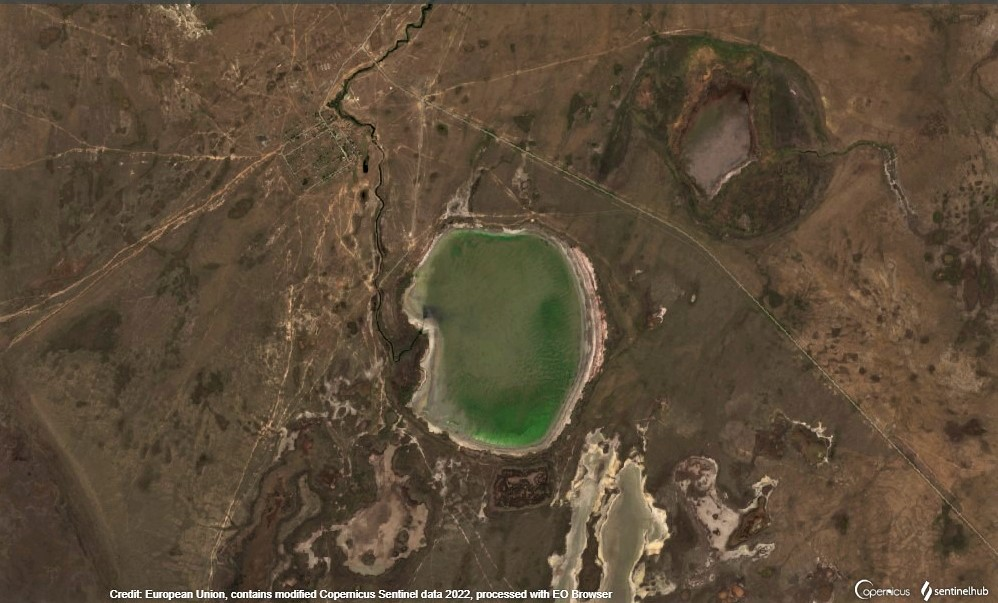
- Urkash village in the Upper left sector

- Location in Kazakhstan
- Coordinates: 51°20′30″N 62°19′30″E
- Country: Kazakhstan
- Region: Kostanay Region
- District: Kamysty District

Population (2017)
  - Total: 150
- Time zone: UTC+6 (East Kazakhstan Time)
- Post code: 110815

Urkash or Orkash (Kazakh: Орқаш; Russian: Уркаш) is a village in Kamysty District, Kostanay Region, Kazakhstan. It is the administrative center of the Urkash Rural District (KATO code - 394857100). Population: 297 (2009 census results); 615 (1999 census results).

== Geography ==
The village is located by river Karasu, 77 kilometers (48 mi) to the southeast of Kamysty, the administrative center of the district. Lake Teniz lies 2 kilometers (1.2 mi) to the southeast and lake Urkash 20 kilometers (12 mi) to the east. The Kazakhstan–Russia border stretches roughly from north to south about 40 kilometers (25 mi) to the west.
