= Kumar Aksakalov =

Kazakh politician (born 1965)

Qumar Aqsaqalov
- Құмар Ақсақалов
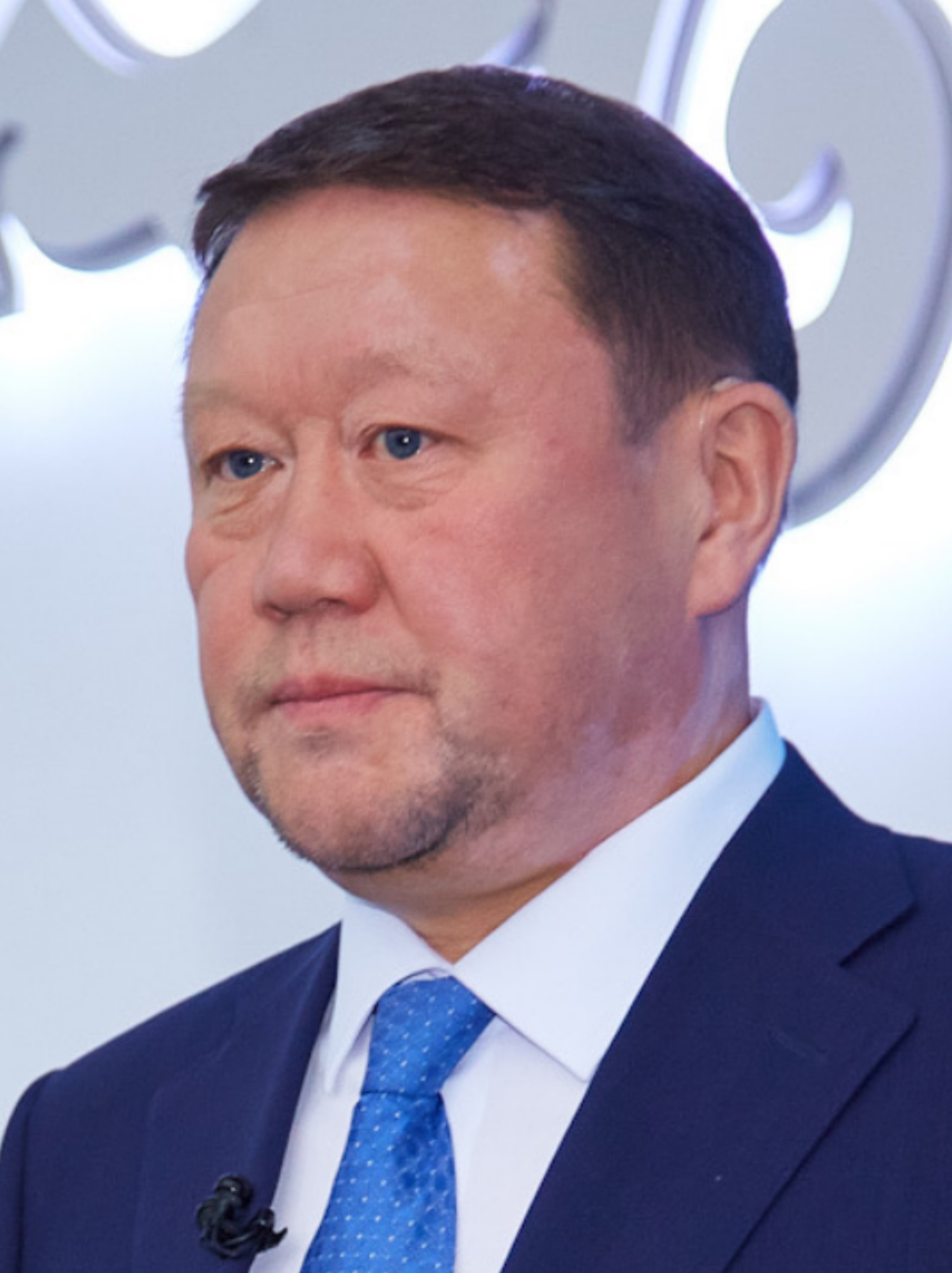
- Aqsaqalov in 2023

Akim of Kostanay Region
- Incumbent
- Assumed office 1 December 2022
- President: Kassym-Jomart Tokayev
- Preceded by: Arhimed Muhambetov

Akim of North Kazakhstan Region
- In office 14 March 2017 – 1 December 2022
- President: Nursultan Nazarbayev; Kassym-Jomart Tokayev
- Preceded by: Erik Sultanov
- Succeeded by: Aidarbek Saparov

Personal details
- Born: 24 August 1965 (age 60) Leninskoe, Leninskiy, Kostanay Region, Kazakh SSR, Soviet Union
- Party: Amanat
- Spouse: Galiya Aksakalova
- Children: 4
- Education: Moscow Institute of Agricultural Engineers
- Awards: Order of Kurmet

Qumar Irgebaiūly Aqsaqalov (Note: Often transliterated as Kumar Irgibayevich Aksakalov through a Russified Romanization of Кумар Иргибаевич Аксакалов.) (Kazakh: Құмар Іргебайұлы Ақсақалов; born 24 August 1965) is a Kazakh politician serving as the akim of Kostanay Region since 2022. He previously served as the akim of North Kazakhstan Region from 2017 to 2022.

== Early life and education ==
Kumar Irgebaiuly Aksakalov was born on August 24, 1965, in Leninskoe, a village in Lenin District (now Uzunkol, Uzunkol District), Kostanay Region, Kazakh Soviet Socialist Republic, Soviet Union (now Kazakhstan).

In 1987, he graduated from the Moscow Institute of Agricultural Engineers (now Russian State Agrarian University – Moscow Timiryazev Agricultural Academy) with a degree in engineering. In 2000 he successfully defended his Candidate of Sciences (PhD-equivalent) dissertation on “The Effectiveness of Agrotechnical Services in Maintaining Machinery Operational Condition (a Case Study of Farms in Kostanay Region).”

== Early career ==
In 1987, after graduating from an institute in Moscow, he returned to Kostanay Region and spent two years working as chief engineer at the Krylov State Farm in Uritsky District (now Sarykol District). In 1989 he was appointed first secretary of the district committee of the Lenin Communist Youth Union of Kazakhstan (LKSM).

In 1992, he resumed work in agriculture, joining the “Mayak” State Farm. After a year there he became director of the small state enterprise “Novoselovka” in Kostanay District. From 1994 to 1996 he served as deputy general director of the “Kustanayskoye” Scientific and Production Association in the same district.

In 1996 he was named president of AOOT “Sever”.

== Political career ==
In October 1998 he was appointed akim (head) of Mendykara District; in October 2002 he became akim of Taranov District (now Beimbet Mailin District).

On May 13, 2004, he moved to Astana and joined the Presidential Administration as a state inspector. On August 22, 2006, akim of Jambyl Region Boribai Jeksembin appointed Aksakalov deputy akim of the region.

In January 2010, he joined the Nur Otan party, initially as deputy head and later two years, January 23, 2012, as head of the party's central apparatus. On February 20, 2014, he was appointed party secretary for ideology.

By president Nursultan Nazarbayev's decree No. 82 on September 4, 2015, he was appointed deputy Aqorda Chief of Staff.

On March 14, 2017, Nazarbayev nominated him for the post of akim of North Kazakhstan Region; the nomination was supported by 30 local maslihat members and by Nazarbayev's decree No. 443 Aksakalov was appointed 9th akim of the North Kazakhstan Region. A month later he joined to the National Commission for the Implementation of the Program of Modernization of Public Consciousness, and on 19 April he became head of the regional branch of Nur Otan. Following Kassym-Jomart Tokayev’s election as president, Aksakalov's powers were renewed on 17 June in accordance with the Constitution.

On December 1, 2022, president Tokayev proposed Aksakalov and Aslan Janyspayev for the post of akim of Kostanay Region. In an open vote attended by 244 all Maslihats members, Aksakalov received 192 votes while Janyspayev received 52. After winning the vote and by Tokayev's decree No. 28 Aksakalov was dismissed from his previous post and appointed 8th akim of the Kostanay Region.

== Personal life ==
Aksakalov is married to Candidate of Sociological Sciences Galiya Askhatqyzy Aksakalova (born 1966). They have three daughters, Sabina (born 1989), Aigerim (born 1990) and Aida (1998), and a son, Atlant (born 2001).

== Awards ==
- Order of Kurmet (2011)
