= Teniz =

Lake in Kazakhstan

- Теңіз
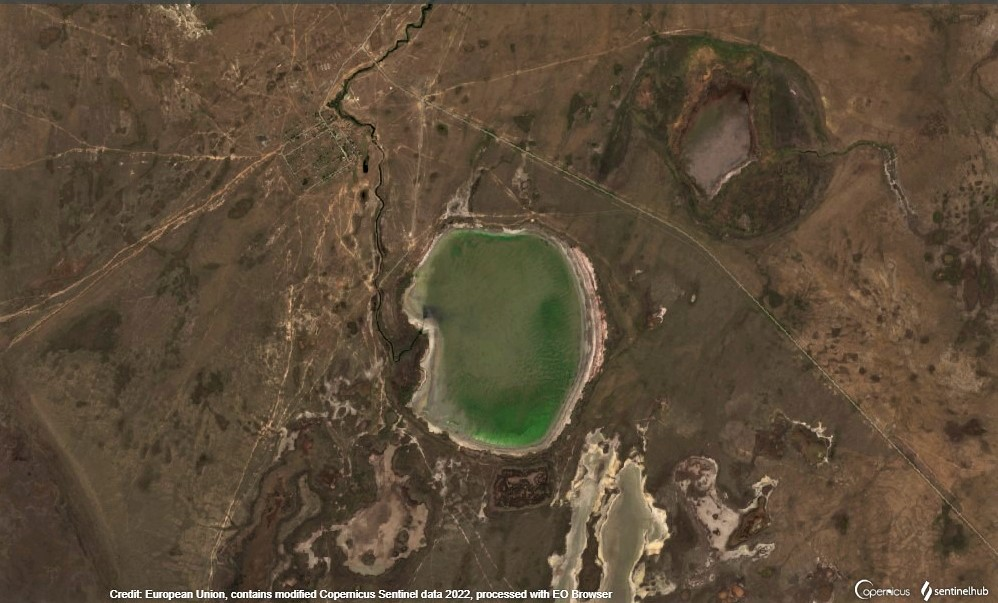
- 2021 Sentinel-2 image of the lake

- Location within Kazakhstan
- Coordinates: 51°20′30″N 62°19′30″E
- Type: endorheic
- Primary inflows: Karasu
- Basin countries: Kazakhstan
- Max. length: 2.9 kilometers (1.8 mi)
- Max. width: 2.3 kilometers (1.4 mi)
- Surface area: 5.44 square kilometers (2.10 sq mi)
- Max. depth: 3.5 meters (11 ft)
- Residence time: UTC+6

Teniz (Kazakh: Теңіз; Russian: Тениз) is a lake in Kamysty District, Kostanay Region, Kazakhstan.

Urkash village lies 2 kilometers (1.2 mi) to the northwest of the lake. Teniz is part of the Tounsor State Nature Reserve, a 31,650 hectares (78,200 acres) protected area under the Naurzum Nature Reserve.

== Geography ==
Teniz lies in the basin of the Tobol, east of the Russian border. It is an endorheic lake located in a depression between lakes Kulykol/Taldykol to the west and Urkash to the east. Shukyrkol lake lies 1.5 kilometers (0.93 mi) to the northeast. The lake has high banks, up to 12 meters (39 ft), steep in places.

River Karasu flows into the western side of the lake from the north.

== Flora and fauna ==
An up to 20 meters (66 ft) wide belt of reeds surround the lakeshore. Teniz is an important stopover of bird migratory routes. However, from the 1980s to 1990s part of the birds, such as the red-breasted geese moved to the Kulykol lake. Currently the most important concentrations are made up of blue ducks, crested ducks, mallards and Eurasian teals, as well as coots.

== See also ==
- Central Asian Flyway
- List of lakes of Kazakhstan
