= Zhitikara District =

Coordinates: 52°13′48″N 61°07′48″E

Zhitikara
- District
- Жітіқара ауданы
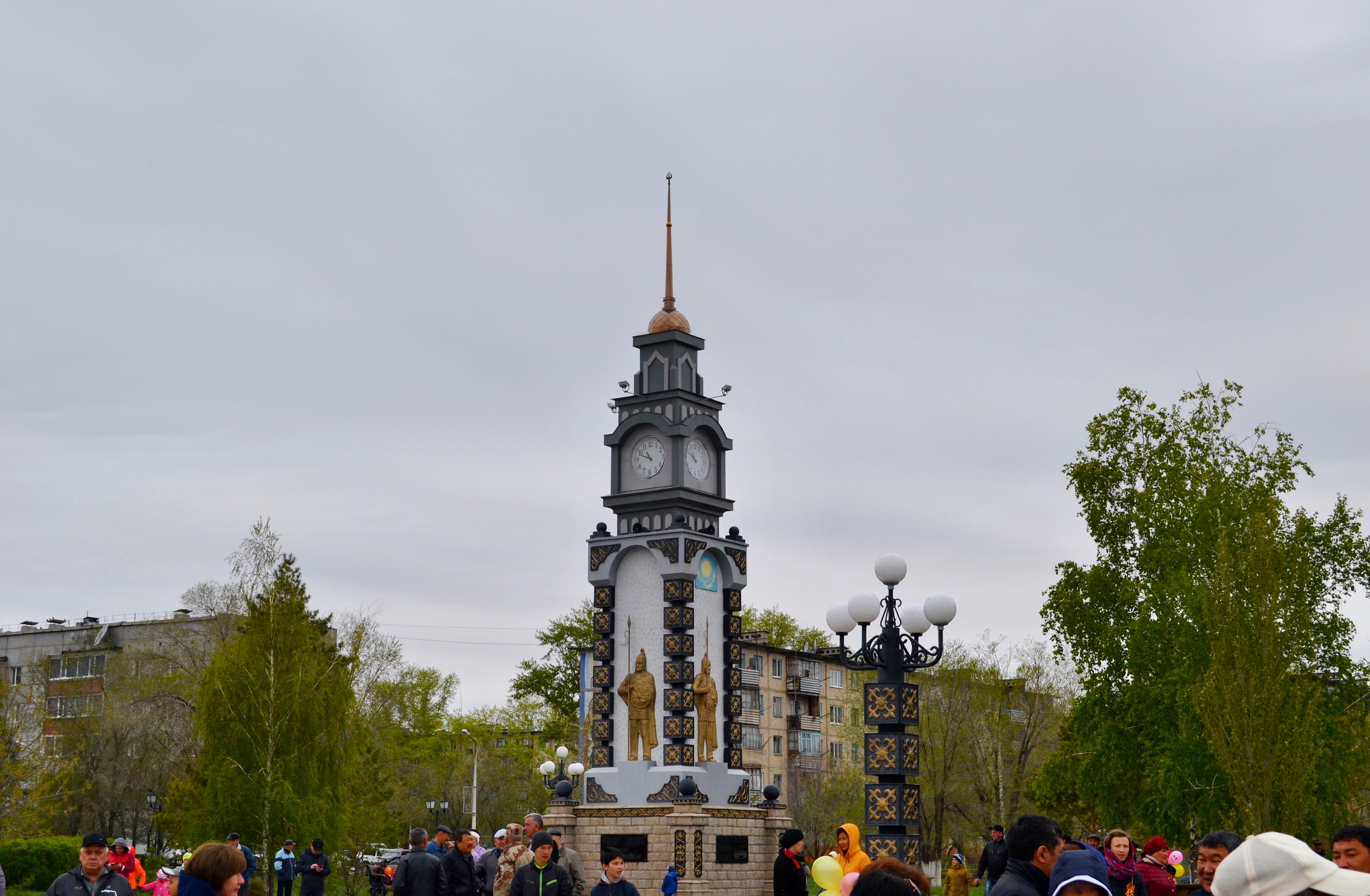
- Clock on the main square of the Zhitikara

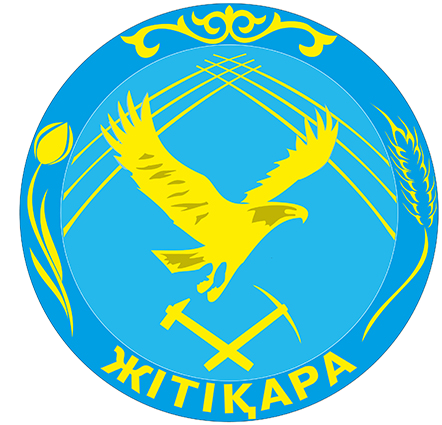
- Seal

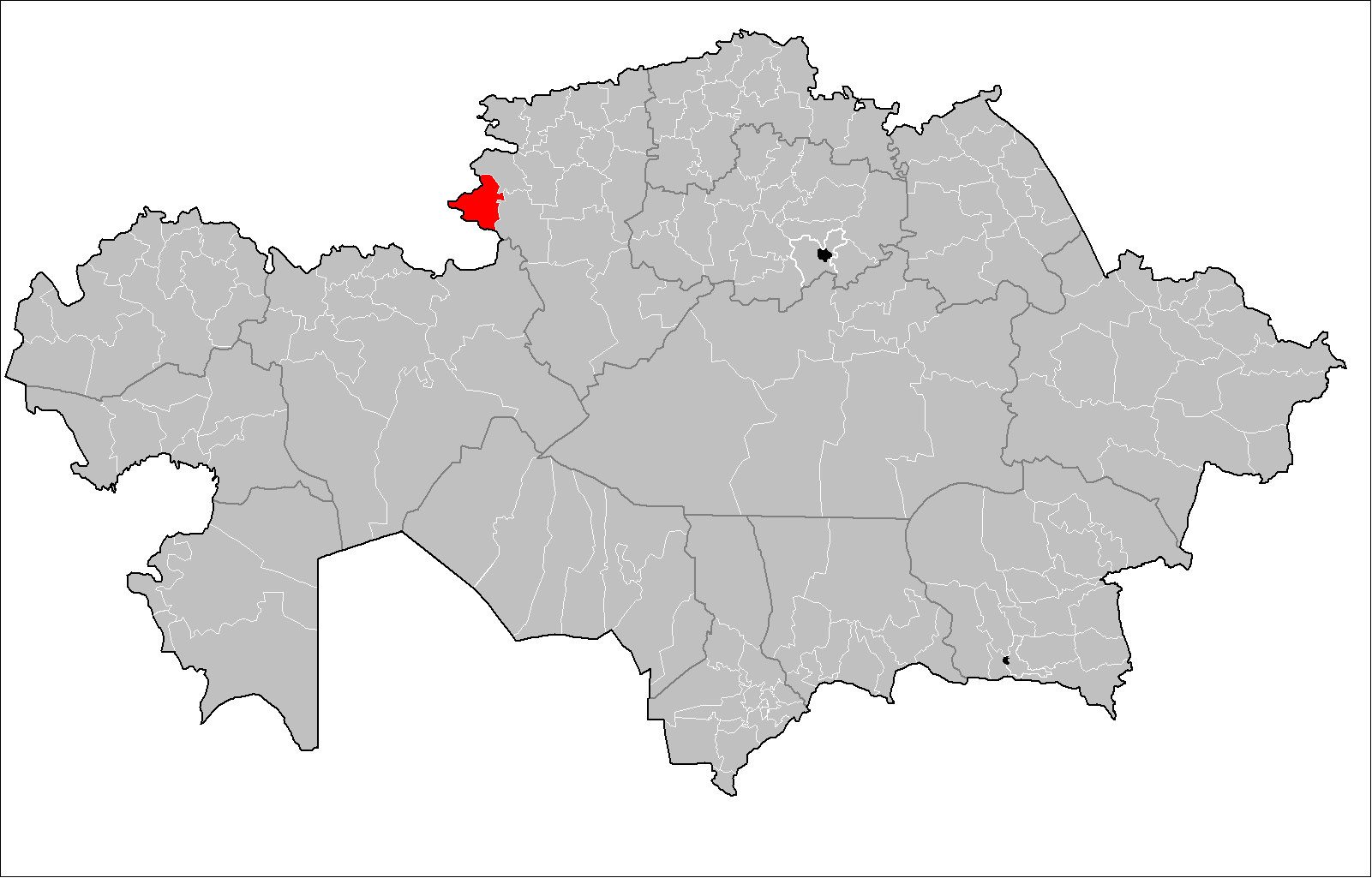
- Country: Kazakhstan
- Region: Kostanay Region
- Administrative center: Zhitikara

Government
  - Akim: Aslan Zhanyspayev

Population (2013)
  - Total: 50,805
- Time zone: UTC+5 (East)

Zhitikara (Kazakh: Жітіқара ауданы, Jıtıqara audany) is a district of Kostanay Region in northern Kazakhstan. The administrative center of the district is the town of Zhitikara. Population: 50,805 (2013 estimate); 50,441 (2009 census results); 56,497 (1999 census results).

== Geography ==
The Zhitikara district is located in the southwest of the Kostanay Region. It borders the Denisov district to the north, the Kamysty district to the east, the Adamovsky and Svetlinsky districts of Russia's Orenburg Region to the south, and the Bredinsky District of Russia's Chelyabinsk Region to the west. The district's area is 7,311.99 km². The highest point is mount Zhitikara (414 m).

=== Climate ===
Average temperatures in January are -17°C, in July 20°C. The amount of precipitation per year from east to west ranges from 250 to 350 mm.

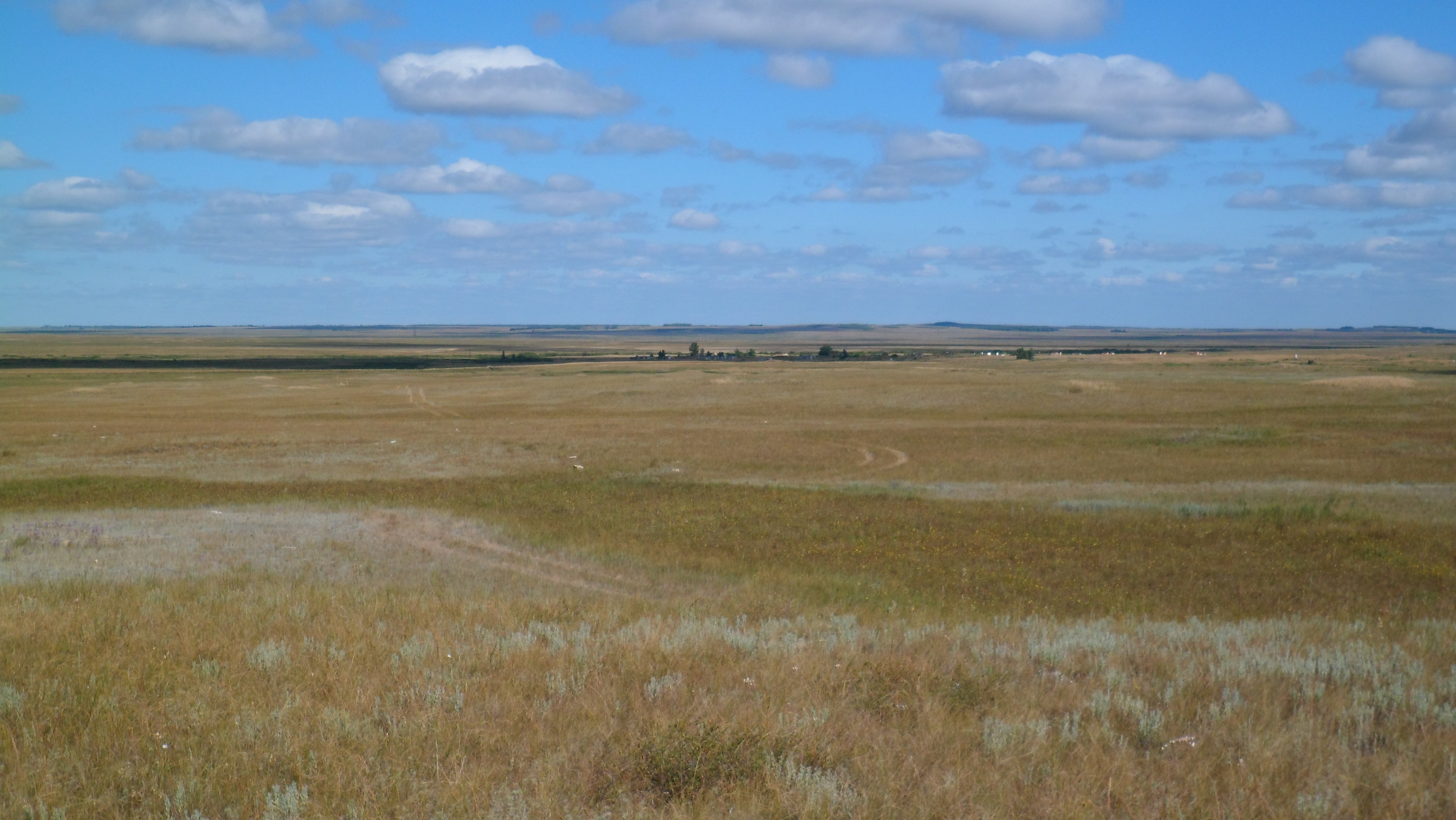
Steppes of the Zhitikara district

== Demographics ==
Historical population
Year	Pop.	±%
1939	25,508	—
1959	31,652	+24.1%
1979	66,597	+110.4%
1989	74,121	+11.3%
1991	66,700	−10.0%
1992	69,300	+3.9%
1993	68,800	−0.7%
1994	69,600	+1.2%
1995	64,400	−7.5%
1996	62,900	−2.3%
1997	59,800	−4.9%
1998	56,660	−5.3%
1999	54,655	−3.5%
2000	53,156	−2.7%
2001	52,522	−1.2%
2002	51,679	−1.6%
2003	51,415	−0.5%
2004	51,224	−0.4%
2005	51,213	−0.0%
2006	51,164	−0.1%
2007	50,995	−0.3%
2008	50,494	−1.0%
2009	50,523	+0.1%
2010	50,761	+0.5%
2011	50,664	−0.2%
2012	50,825	+0.3%
2013	50,816	−0.0%
2014	50,449	−0.7%
2015	50,032	−0.8%
2016	49,492	−1.1%
2017	48,755	−1.5%
2018	48,261	−1.0%
2019	47,661	−1.2%

As of January 2019, the population of Zhitikara district is 47,661.
