= Kamysty =

Kamysty may refer to

- Kamysty (Kostanay Region), a village in Kamysty District, Kazakhstan
- Kamysty District, a district in Kostanay Region, Kazakhstan
- Kamysty (lake), a body of water in Magzhan Zhumabaev District, Kazakhstan
