= Baurzhan Abdishev =

Kazakhstani politician

Baurzhan Abdishev (Kazakh: Бауыржан Түйтеұлы Әбдішев, Baýyrjan Túıteuly Ábdishev; born 3 June 1968, Atasu, Kazakhstan) is a Kazakhstani politician.

== Career ==
From 1987 to 1989, he served in the Soviet Army. In 1992-1994 GG he worked as a senior economist fleet No.4 city of Karaganda. In 1994-1995 GG he was a leading engineer of VES Karaganda Regional Department of passenger transport. From 1995 to 1999 he held various positions in the Customs Directorate of Karaganda and Kostanay region. In 1999 he was appointed deputy head of the customs regime of protection and the Customs Committee of the Ministry of State Revenues of the Republic of Kazakhstan. In February 2002, he headed the Customs Department of the Pavlodar region. From July to October 2003 he worked as Deputy Chairman of the Customs Control Agency of the Republic of Kazakhstan. Since October 2003, he transferred to the post of Deputy Chairman of the Customs Control Committee of the Ministry of Finance. From January 2010 to September 2012 he headed the Akimat of Karaganda. September 22, 2012 he was appointed Vice-Minister of Environment of the Republic of Kazakhstan. A January 29, 2013 received a new assignment - Akim of Karaganda Region. June 20, 2014 was dismissed from the post of mayor of the Region.

== Arrest ==
On 23 September 2014, Baurzhan Abdishev was arrested on charges of corruption and abuse of power during his term as Akim of Karaganda Region.

In January 2015, in connection with the entry into force of the new Criminal Code of the Republic of Kazakhstan, the status of ex-mayor has been changed from the accused to the suspect. The investigation is still going on. The official was suspected under Article 307 of the Criminal Code РК. The Karaganda regional court refused to release the arrested person from the custody of the investigative jail.
