= List of Äkims of Kostanay Region =

This is the list of äkims of Kostanay Region that have held the position since 1992.

== List of Äkims ==
- Kenjebek Ükin (7 February 1992 – 18 November 1993)
- Baltaş Tūrsymbaev (18 November 1993 – 29 September 1995)
- Toqtarbai Qadambaev (29 September 1995 – 19 August 1998)
- Ömırzaq Şökeev (19 August 1998 – 20 March 2004)
- Sergey Kulagin (20 March 2004 – 20 January 2012)
- Nūraly Säduaqasov (20 January 2012 – 11 September 2015)
- Arhimed Mūhambetov (11 September 2015 – 1 December 2022)
- Qūmar Aqsaqalov (1 December 2022 – present)
