= Jitiqara =

Jitiqara Жітіқара
- Town
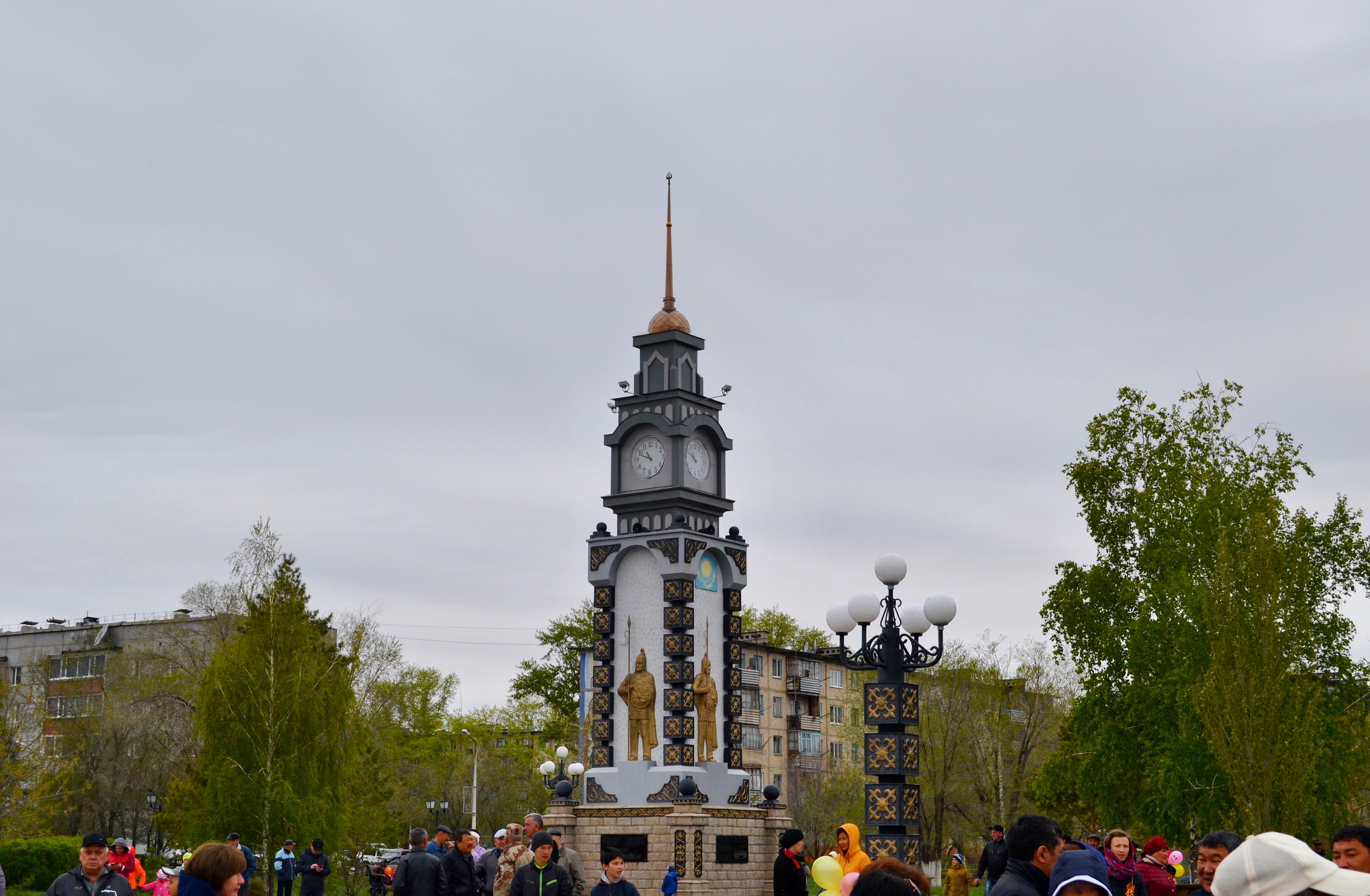

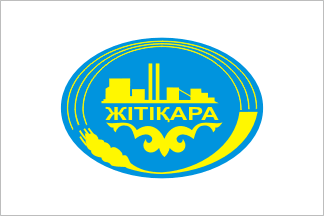
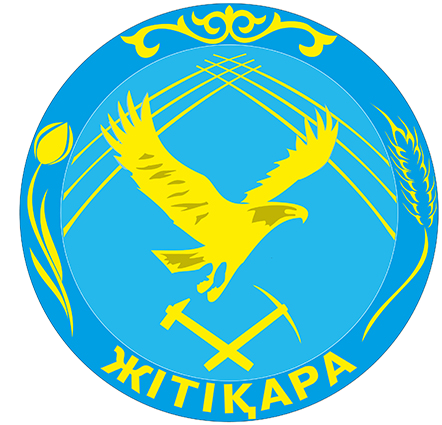
- Flag Coat of arms

- Location in Kostanay Region, Kazakhstan
- Coordinates: 52°11′27″N 61°12′04″E
- Country: Kazakhstan
- Region: Kostanay Region
- District: Zhitikara District
- Village: 1880

Population (2009)
  - Total: 33,587
- Time zone: UTC+6 (ALMT)
- Website: http://zhitikara.kostanay.gov.kz/

Jitiqara (Kazakh: Жітіқара, Jıtıqara; Russian: Житикара) is a town and the administrative center of Zhitikara District in Kostanay Region of northwestern Kazakhstan, close to the Kazakhstan–Russia border.

== Geography ==
The city of Jitiqara is located in the southwestern part of the Kostanay region, 217 kilometers from the regional center of the city of Kostanay on the Turgay Plateau, west of the Tobol River. Population: 33,587 (2009 census results); 36,359 (1999 census results).

The territory of the city occupies an area of 6080 hectares, the height above sea level is 271 m.

== History ==
Jitiqara was founded in 1880 as the aul of Konildi. At the time, it was a part of Nikolayevsky Uyezd (later renamed Kustanaysky Uyezd) of Turgay Oblast. In 1915, it was renamed Zhitikara (Dzhetygara), and subsequently granted urban-type settlement status. In 1920, Turgay Oblast was transformed into Turgay Governorate, and on November 9, 1920, it was abolished and merged into Orenburg-Turgay Governorate. On April 1, 1921 the area was transferred into newly established Kustanay Governorate. Dzhetyhara was a part of Adamovsky District and the administrative center of Dzhetygarinskaya Volost. On August 15, 1922 the district was abolished and merged into Denisov District. On September 21, 1925 Kustanay Governorate was abolished and transformed into Kustanaysky Uytezd. On January 17, 1928 Kustanay Okrug of Aktobe Region was established, which included also Zhetigara District. In February 1932, okrugs were abolished, and the districts were directly subordinated to the oblast. Until 1936, the district administrative center of Zhitikara District was the settlement of Denisovka, and subsequently Dzhetygara was made the district center. On July 29, 1936, Kostanay Region was established as a part of Kazakh Soviet Socialist Republic, and Zhitikara District became a part of Kostanay Region.

In 1939, Dzetygara was granted the town status. In 1962, it was made a town of oblast significance. In 1997, the official spelling was changed to Jitiqara, and Jitiqara was made a town of district significance, the center of Zhitikara District.

== Economy ==
=== Industry ===
The main industrial enterprise in Jitiqara is the Kostanay Minerals, mainly producing asbestos.

=== Transportation ===
Jitiqara is a terminal of the railway side line leading to the station of Tobol which is located on the railway between Kartaly and Astana.

The town is connected by roads with Kostanay via Rudny and with Kartaly.

== Climate ==
Jitiqara has a humid continental climate (Köppen: Dfb), characterized by frigid winters and warm summers.

Climate data for Jitiqara (1991–2020)
Month	Jan	Feb	Mar	Apr	May	Jun	Jul	Aug	Sep	Oct	Nov	Dec	Year
Mean daily maximum °C (°F)	−10.8 (12.6)	−9.4 (15.1)	−2.0 (28.4)	11.9 (53.4)	21.8 (71.2)	27.0 (80.6)	27.9 (82.2)	26.9 (80.4)	20.2 (68.4)	11.0 (51.8)	−1.1 (30.0)	−8.3 (17.1)	9.6 (49.3)
Daily mean °C (°F)	−14.7 (5.5)	−14.0 (6.8)	−6.9 (19.6)	5.5 (41.9)	14.3 (57.7)	19.5 (67.1)	20.9 (69.6)	19.3 (66.7)	12.7 (54.9)	4.8 (40.6)	−5.1 (22.8)	−12.3 (9.9)	3.7 (38.7)
Mean daily minimum °C (°F)	−18.7 (−1.7)	−18.3 (−0.9)	−11.4 (11.5)	0.0 (32.0)	7.3 (45.1)	12.4 (54.3)	14.5 (58.1)	12.9 (55.2)	6.4 (43.5)	−0.3 (31.5)	−8.9 (16.0)	−16.2 (2.8)	−1.7 (28.9)
Average precipitation mm (inches)	14.7 (0.58)	17.4 (0.69)	19.9 (0.78)	24.0 (0.94)	40.6 (1.60)	32.4 (1.28)	47.2 (1.86)	30.2 (1.19)	21.1 (0.83)	27.1 (1.07)	19.7 (0.78)	19.4 (0.76)	313.7 (12.35)
Average precipitation days (≥ 1.0 mm)	4.3	4.5	4.3	5.0	6.3	5.8	6.6	4.9	4.3	5.1	5.1	4.8	61.0
Source: NOAA

== See also ==
- Rashid Nurgaliev, former Minister of Internal Affairs of Russia, born in this town.
