= List of Äkims of North Kazakhstan Region =

This is the list of äkıms of North Kazakhstan Region that have held the position since 1992.

== List of Äkıms ==
- Vladimir Gartman (11 February 1992 – 19 December 1997)
- Danial Ahmetov (19 December 1997 – 12 October 1999)
- Qajymūrat Nağymanov (13 October 1999 – 17 May 2002)
- Anatoly Smirnov (17 May 2002 – 24 December 2003)
- Taiyr Mansūrov (24 December 2003 – 9 October 2007)
- Serık Bılälov (9 October 2007 – 22 January 2013)
- Samat Eskendırov (22 January 2013 – 27 May 2014)
- Erık Sūltanov (27 May 2014 – 14 March 2017)
- Qūmar Aqsaqalov (14 March 2017 – 1 December 2022)
- Aidarbek Saparov (1 December 2022 – 4 September 2023)
- Gauez Nurmukhambetov (since 23 September 2023)
