= Altynsarin District =

Coordinates: 52°59′24″N 64°32′24″E

Altynsarin
- District
- Алтынсарин ауданы
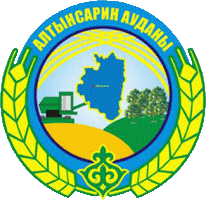
- Seal

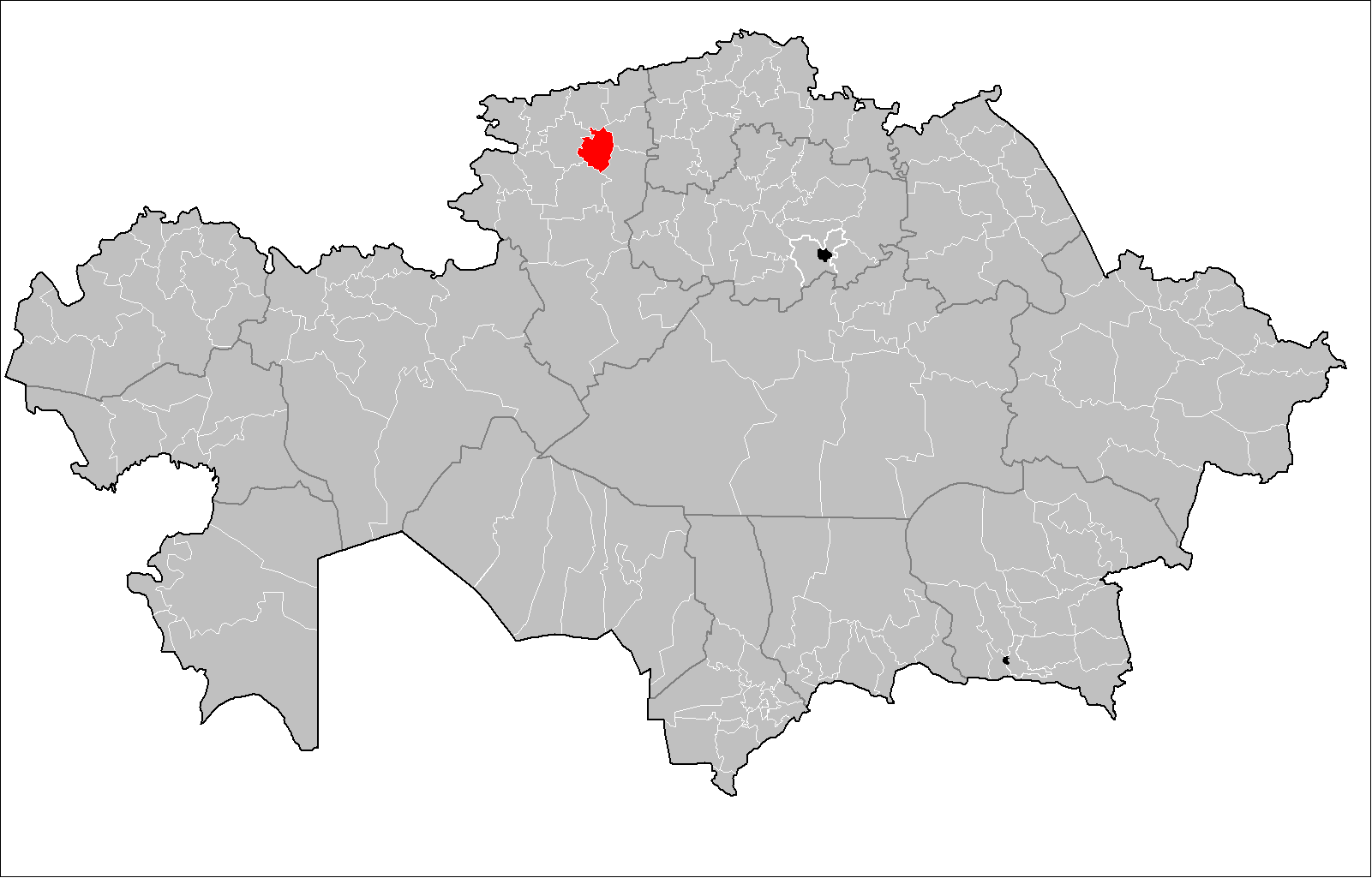
- Country: Kazakhstan
- Region: Kostanay Region
- Administrative center: Obagan

Government
  - Akim: Sartov Artur Maratovich

Population (2013)
  - Total: 15,038
- Time zone: UTC+6 (East)

Altynsarin (Kazakh: Алтынсарин ауданы, Altynsarin audany) is a district of Kostanay Region in northern Kazakhstan. Named in honor of Ybyrai Altynsarin, a highly influential 19th-century Kazakh educator, writer, and social activist who opened the first Russian-Kazakh schools. The administrative center of the district is the auyl of Obagan. Population: 15,038 (2013 estimate); 15,688 (2009 census results); 20,367 (1999 census results).
