= Urkash =

Salt lake in Kazakhstan

- Орқаш
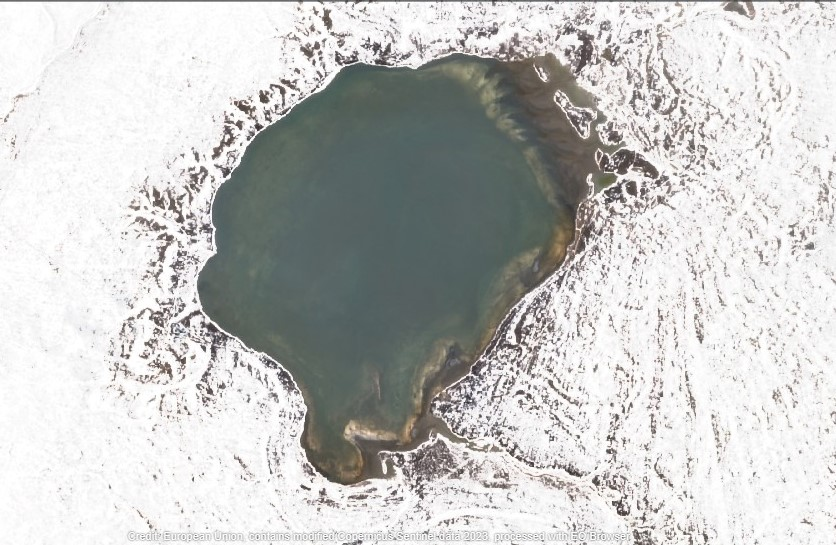
- Urkash Sentinel-2 image

- Location within Kazakhstan
- Coordinates: 51°19′N 62°40′E
- Type: salt lake
- Primary inflows: Sarybalkash
- Basin countries: Kazakhstan
- Max. length: 5.9 kilometers (3.7 mi)
- Max. width: 3.8 kilometers (2.4 mi)
- Surface area: 16.34 square kilometers (6.31 sq mi)
- Shore length^{1}: 18.7 kilometers (11.6 mi)
- Surface elevation: 202 meters (663 ft)
- Settlements: Urkash
- ^{1} Shore length is not a well-defined measure.

Urkash (Kazakh: Орқаш; Russian: Уркаш) is a lake in Kamysty District, Kostanay Region, Kazakhstan.

The nearest inhabited place is Urkash village, located 20 kilometers (12 mi) to the west. Salt has been mined at the lake since the 19th century, mostly for household purposes.

== Geography ==
Urkash is located in a sector of scattered small lakes of the western Turgay Plateau. Lakes of the area are both fresh water and saline. Most of the Urkash lakeshore is rocky, but the southern coastline is flat and marshy. The Kazakhstan–Russia border lies about 60 kilometers (37 mi) to the west. Lake Zharsor, the second largest lake of the area, lies about 8 kilometers (5.0 mi) to the ENE and Zhaksybay 48 kilometers (30 mi) to the northeast. The lake is fed by groundwater and snow. River Sarybalkash is the main inflow of the lake. Its waters are salty.

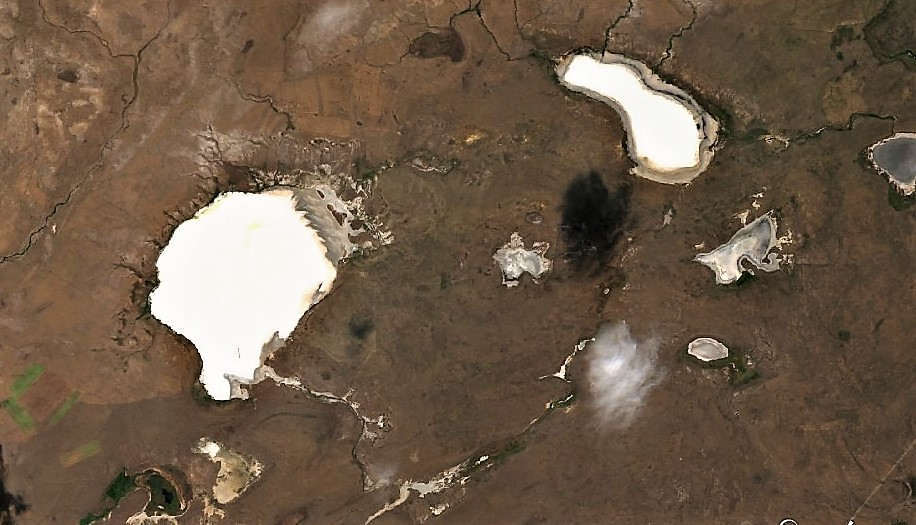
Urkash (left) and Zharsor lakes Sentinel-2 image.

== Flora and fauna ==
Urkash belongs to the Zharsor-Urkash Lake System a 41,250 hectares (101,900 acres) Ramsar site since 2007. The southern shore of the lake is covered with reeds. The Zharsor-Urkash Lake System, of which the lake is a part, is a regular stopping site of the critically endangered siberian crane. The lake also provides a place for the nesting, migration and molting of wetland bird species, such as the white-fronted goose, common crane, little stint and curlew sandpiper.

== See also ==
- List of lakes of Kazakhstan
- List of Ramsar Wetlands of International Importance
