= Kulykol =

Lake in Kazakhstan

- Қулыкөл
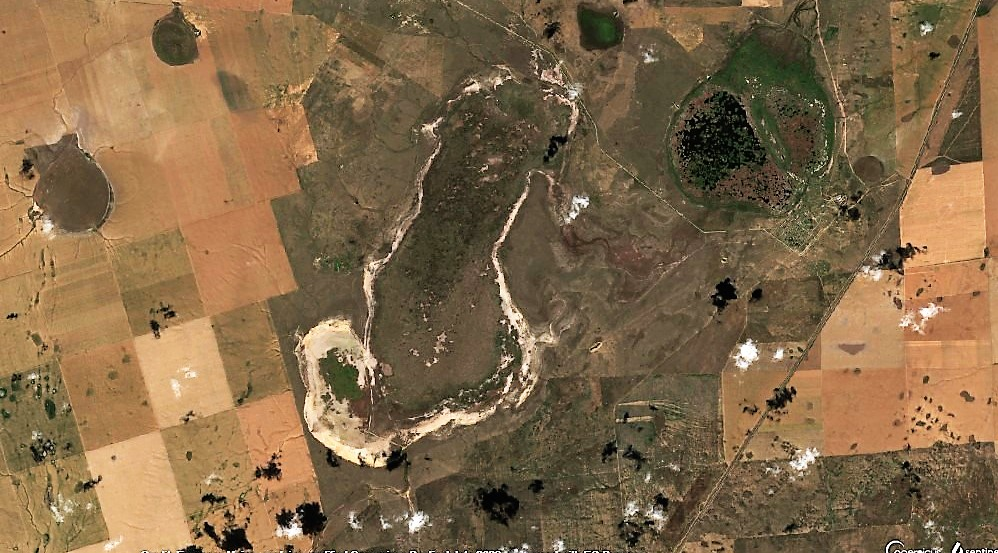
- Sentinel-2 image of the Kulykol-Taldykol Lake System

- Location within Kazakhstan
- Coordinates: 51°23′N 61°51′E
- Type: brackish
- Basin countries: Kazakhstan, Russia
- Max. length: 10 kilometers (6.2 mi)
- Max. width: 4.9 kilometers (3.0 mi)
- Surface area: 33.6 square kilometers (13.0 sq mi)
- Average depth: 2 meters (6 ft 7 in)
- Max. depth: 4 meters (13 ft)
- Shore length^{1}: 35 kilometers (22 mi)
- Surface elevation: 247.7 meters (813 ft)
- Settlements: Taldykol
- ^{1} Shore length is not a well-defined measure.

Kulykol (Kazakh: Қулыкөл) is a lake in Kamysty District, Kostanay Region, Kazakhstan. The lake lies near the Kazakhstan–Russia border.

The nearest inhabited place is Taldykol, located 5 kilometers (3.1 mi) to the east. Kulykol is part of the Kulykol-Taldykol Lake System, a 8,300 hectares (21,000 acres) Ramsar site since 2009. The name of the lake comes from the Kazakh "Қулы/көл", meaning "swan/lake".

== Geography ==
Kulykol is an elongated lake, stretching roughly from NNE to SSW. It is part of the right bank of the upper course of the Tobol basin. In years of abundant snowfall its area may increase to 46 square kilometers (18 sq mi). Smaller Taldykol lake lies 10 kilometers (6.2 mi) east of the northeastern corner of the lake. The Russian border runs about 10 kilometers (6.2 mi) to the west of Kulykol. Lake Ayke lies about 40 kilometers (25 mi) to the SSW right at the border.

== Fauna ==
Part of the shore of the lake is covered with reeds. The Kulykol-Taldykol Lake System, of which the lake is a part, is a critical site for the nesting, migration and molting of wetland bird species, including the critically endangered siberian crane. The lake is rich in fish and local residents do small-scale fishing in it. There are also small mammal species living near the lake, such as the muskrat.

== See also ==
- List of lakes of Kazakhstan
- List of Ramsar Wetlands of International Importance
