= Kamshat Donenbaeva =

Soviet politician (1943–2017)

- Кәмшат Дөненбаева
- Born: 15 September 1943; Leninskoye, Kostanay Region, Kazakh SSR, Soviet Union
- Died: 9 November 2017 (aged 74); Kostanay, Kazakhstan
- Other names: Kamshat Donenbayeva
- Occupations: agricultural laborer, politician
- Years active: 1961–2002

Kamshat Baigazinovna Donenbaeva (Kazakh: Кәмшат Байғазықызы Дөненбаева; Kämşat Baiğazyqyzy Dönenbaeva, [kʰæmʂæt tʰønʲenbαjiva]; 15 September 1943 – 9 November 2017) was a Kazakhstani agricultural laborer, who served as a deputy in the Supreme Soviet from 1974 to 1989. For exceeding production goals, she was awarded the Order of Lenin twice and in 1975 received the Hero of Socialist Labour medal.

== Early life ==
Kamshat Baigazinovna Donenbaeva was born on 15 September 1943 in Leninskoye (now Uzunkol), in the Kostanay Region of the Kazakh Soviet Socialist Republic. At the age of fourteen, she began working at the Demyanovsky grain elevator, while attending mechanics courses. She completed her schooling in 1961 at the Kostanai Agricultural College, graduating as an equipment operator.

== Career ==
Donenbaeva began work as a tractor driver on the state collective farm "Kharkov". Within a year, she began to set production records for plowing on a Belarus-style tractor. In 1962, she exceed her allotted 720 hectares to plow by competing 1,018 hectares. She began testing equipment, working on a variety of tractors including the MTZ-5, MTZ-50, DT-54, DT-74, K-700, and K-701, as well as combines, mowers and reapers. The Kirovets K-700 was designed specifically for Donenbaeva and she was the first to test the equipment. Annually she exceeded her plowing yields by one and a half to two times her required production. In 1972, Donenbaeva placed first in the regional plowing competition of plowers and took 3rd place in the national competition. For her effort, she was awarded the Order of Lenin on 13 December 1972. The following year, she took the grand prize at the All-Union competition in Zernograd.

In 1974, Donenbaeva was elected as a delegate to the Kostanay Regional Council and the Supreme Soviet of the USSR. The following year, she was honored with a second Order of Lenin, as well as the Hero of Socialist Labour and in 1976 was decorated with the Order of the Badge of Honour. She was re-elected three times as a deputy in the Supreme Soviet, serving until 1989. Simultaneously, she raised four children and for five years (1980–1985) was the deputy chair of the Soviet of Nationalities. She was promoted to safety engineer at the Kharkov farm in 1990, and then three years later became the overseer until her retirement. In celebration of her retirement, she made The Hajj to Mecca, Saudi Arabia in 2002. In 2015, Donenbaeva was honored at the International Day of Older Persons festivities by Archimedes Mukhambetov the Akim of the Kostanay Region her region and Basil Zhakypov, Akim of the City of Kostanay as a national heroine.

== Death and legacy ==
Donenbaeva died on 9 November 2017 in Kostanay and her funeral was held at the Mosque of Kostanay. In September 2018, the regional House of Friendship hosted a memorial in honor of Donenbaeva and it was announced that a biography was being prepared of her life.
