= Lisakovsk =

City in Kazakhstan

Coordinates: 52°32′N 62°30′E

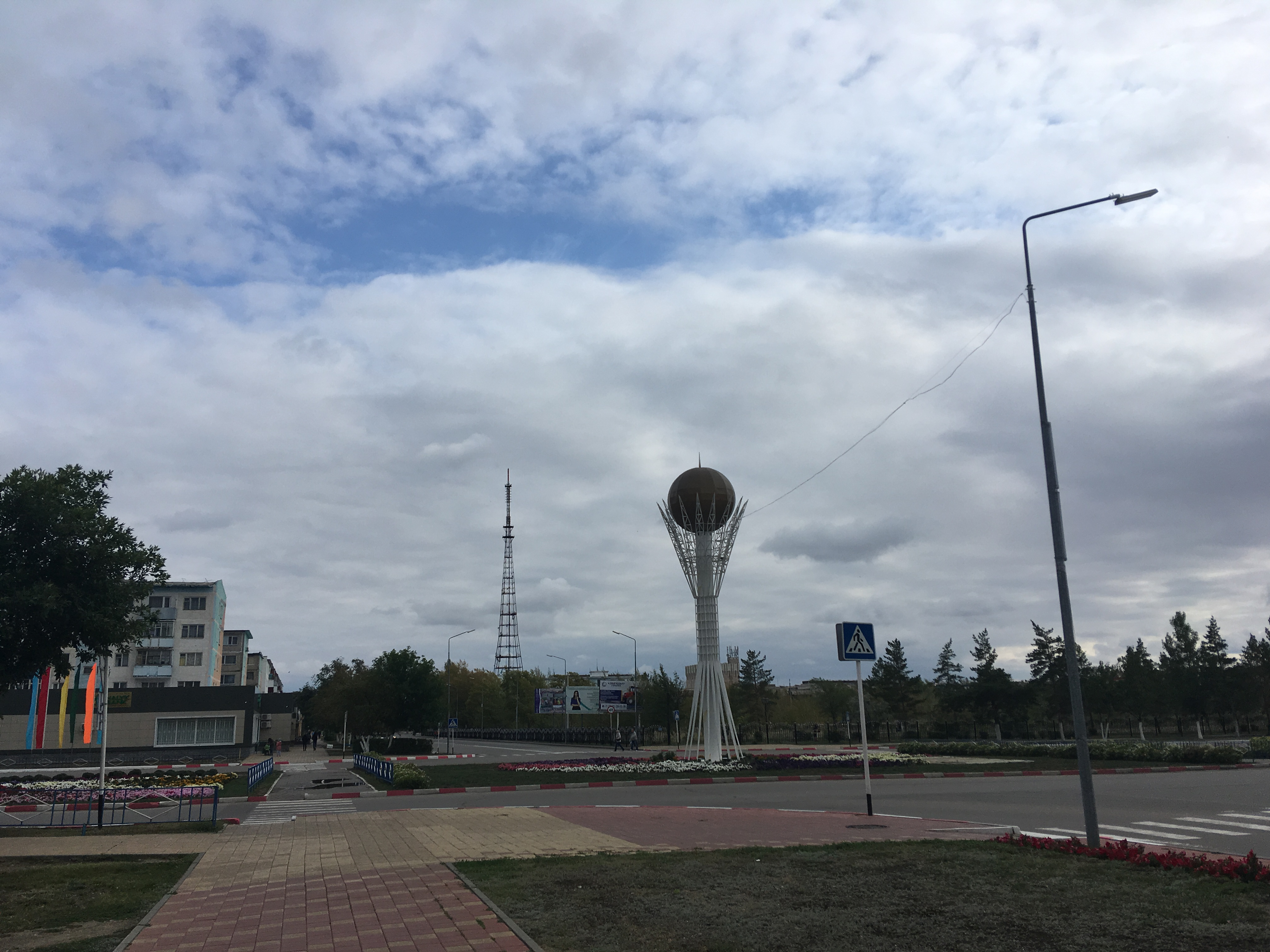
Lisakovsk

Lisakovsk (Kazakh: Лисаковск) is a city in Kostanay Region of northwestern Kazakhstan. It is located about 105 km SW of the regional capital city Kostanay on the right bank of the Tobol River (a tributary of the Irtysh River). Population: 36,622 (2009 census results); 35,161 (1999 census results).

== History ==
The city owes its existence to a high-phosphorus, 1.72 billion-ton iron ore deposit discovered in 1949; development did not begin until the 1960s. The government began to create a village in the wilderness to house miners. In 1971 the village became a city. 1991 ore production was 6.2 million tons, but it began falling after independence; 1994 production was 2.6 MT.

In the mid-eighties construction of a chemical plant was begun, but construction was interrupted after the collapse of the Soviet Union.

In the early 1990s mining in Lisakovsk was in a critical situation due to a sharp fall in demand for iron concentrate in the metallurgical industry in Kazakhstan and Russia. City authorities had to take extraordinary steps to maintain the economy and to develop new industries.

By decision of the Kazakhi Parliament, the city became a free economic zone in 1992. It began searching for new kinds of employment in a market economy.

== Demography ==
Representatives of 51 different nationalities live in the city.

== Economy ==
During January–May 2010, industrial enterprises of all kinds produced goods worth 8,289.3 million tenge, 148.5% more than it produced in January–May 2009.

The mining industry during this period produced goods worth 6292.7 million tenge, which is 175% higher than the corresponding level last year. In comparison with January–May 2009 iron ore (in kind) increased by 0.8%, bauxite by 9.5%, and zinc ore extraction increased 4.5 times. The share of mining citywide was 75.9%. The manufacturing industry in January–May 2010 produced products to 1307 million tenge, which is lower than the corresponding period last year by 4.6%. 80.1% of manufacture by volume is the production of food (including beverages and tobacco): food products produced 1046.7 million tenge. In the machinery industry in January–May of this year 4 agricultural harvesters. Assembling the reapers made when receiving the order. The garment industry produced 1,716 units. amounting to 4.5 million tenge. The production of polyethylene film (139.1%), corrugated cardboard (104.1%), furniture and wood products-on 2.2% (in monetary terms). In the area of distribution of electricity, gas and water production volume amounted to 689.6 million tenge.

== Archeology ==
In 1984 settlements and cemeteries of the Bronze Age were found. The Andronovo culture complex dates from the 15th-18th centuries BC. Over the years research has revealed more than two thousand square meters of settlements and excavated more than a hundred and fifty burial structures in the form of burial mounds and stone walls. These findings characterize the basic life-support systems and religious ideas of Indo-Iranian tribes that lived in the steppe zone of the Upper Pritobolya in the mid-second millennium BC. The collection of the Lisakovsk city museum, which houses the bulk of the finds, includes more than 200 ceramic vessels, 30 pieces of gold jewelry in the form of rings, more than 40 bronze ornaments (rings, bracelets, ornaments of the braid), stone, bone and bronze tools.

In 2011 it was announced that Kazakh archeologists had found a 3000-year-old burial site during excavation of a mound. Three Bronze Age stone vaults were found; one contained a 2-meter skeleton thought to belong to a chieftain. More than a hundred funerary structures have been studied. Items of funeral rites have been found as well as the remains of wooden structures, fragments of textiles, and evidence of weaving and felt making. One of the rare finds is an idol of anthropomorphic form. The excavations of a Kurgan leader "demonstrate the complex cosmogonic idea, inherent in the architectural design of the mound.

The city administration supports research archeologists around the city. As a logical extension of this work it is considering the establishment of a "Tumar" eco-cultural center as the pilot complex of tourist, educational, and ethnographic objects.

According to the Journal of Archaeological Science, in July 2020, scientists from South Ural State University studied two Late Bronze Age horses with the aid of radiocarbon dating from Kurgan 5 of the Novoilinovsky 2 cemetery. Researcher Igor Chechushkov, indicated that the Andronovites had an ability on horse riding several centuries earlier than many researchers had previously expected. Among the horses investigated, the stallion was nearly 20 years old and the mare was 18 years old. According to scientists, animals were buried with the person they accompanied throughout their lives, and they were used not only for food, but also for harnessing to vehicles and riding.

"It is likely that militarized elite, whose power was based on the physical control of fellow tribesmen and neighbors with the help of riding and fighting skills, was buried in the Novoilinovsky-2 burial ground. The rider has a significant advantage over the infantryman. There may be another explanation: These elite fulfilled the function of mediating conflicts within the collective, and therefore had power and high social status. Metaphorically, this kind of elite can be called Sheriffs of the Bronze Age" said Igor Chechushkov.

== Blazon ==
The coat-of-arms of Lisakovsk was adopted in 1995. The emblem depicts a blue sky with the sun. Beneath it runs a fox - the symbol of the city. Under the fox is a dark brown stripe, blended with the frame. The emblem symbolizes the ground, fertile, rich in various minerals. Zip code - 111200

== Schools ==
Schools of the city Lisakovsk constantly working 7 schools.

- GUSSH No. 1 (with a sporty bias)
- GUSSH No. 2 (with in-depth study of English language)
- GUSSH No. 3 (for the Kazakh-speaking children)
- GUSSH No. 4
- Research School Gymnasium (with in-depth study of mathematics)
- GUSSH No. 6
- PG Boarding city Lisakovsk
