= Karabalyk District =

Coordinates: 53°46′48″N 62°05′24″E

Karabalyk
- District
- Қарабалық ауданы
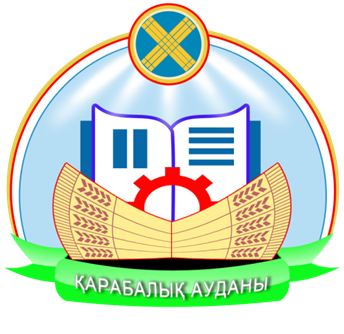
- Coat of arms

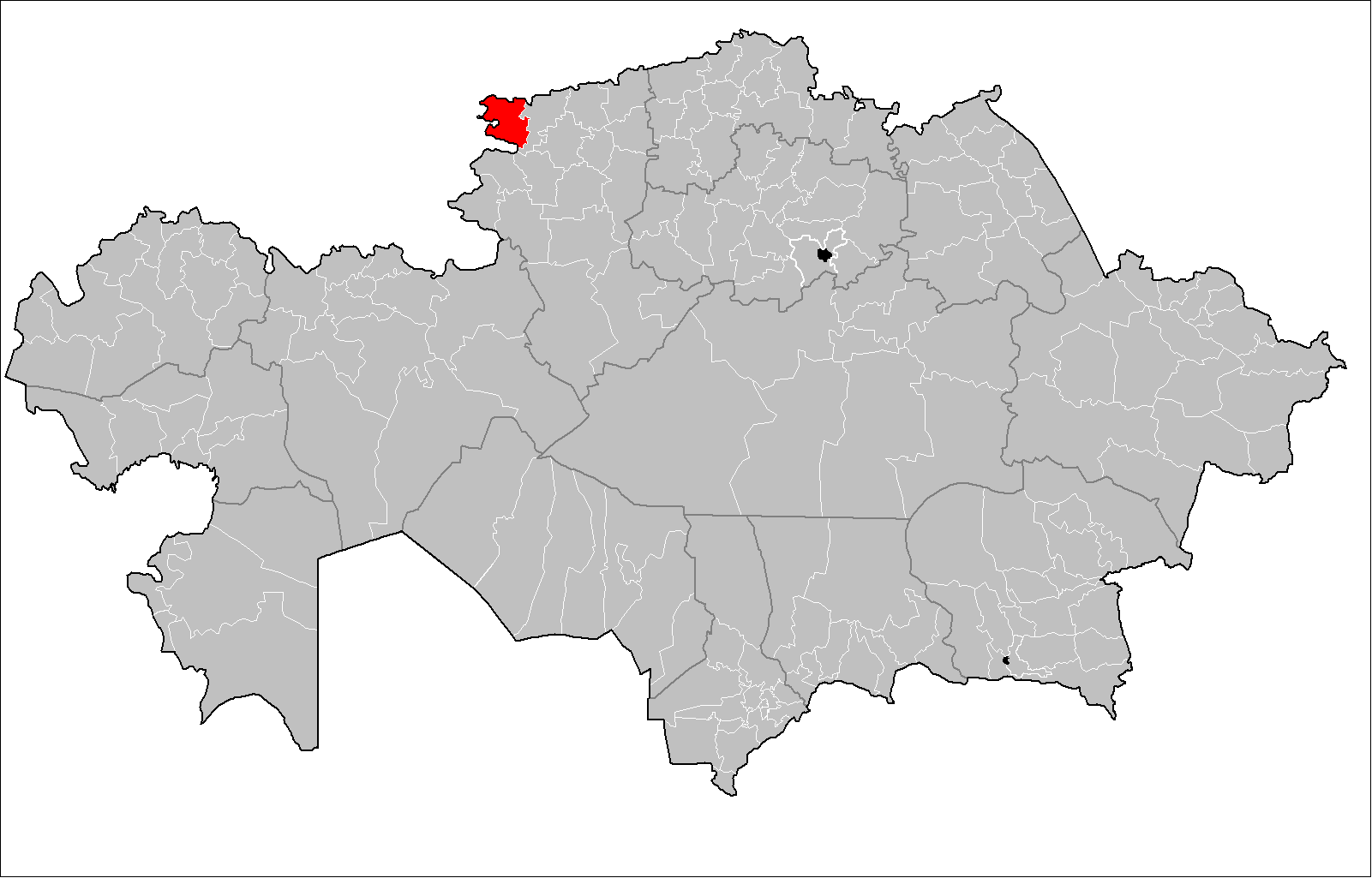
- Country: Kazakhstan
- Region: Kostanay Region
- Administrative center: Karabalyk
- Established: 1928

Government
  - Akim: Khalikov Ruslan Bolatuly

Population (2013)
  - Total: 29,594
- Time zone: UTC+6 (East)
- Website: http://karabalyk.kostanay.gov.kz/

Karabalyk (Kazakh: Қарабалық ауданы, Qarabalyq audany) is a district of Kostanay Region in western Kazakhstan. The administrative center of the district is the urban-type settlement of Karabalyk. Population: 29,594 (2013 estimate); 31,399 (2009 census results); 43,145 (1999 census results).
