= Aidarbek Saparov =

Kazakh politician

- Айдарбек Сапаров
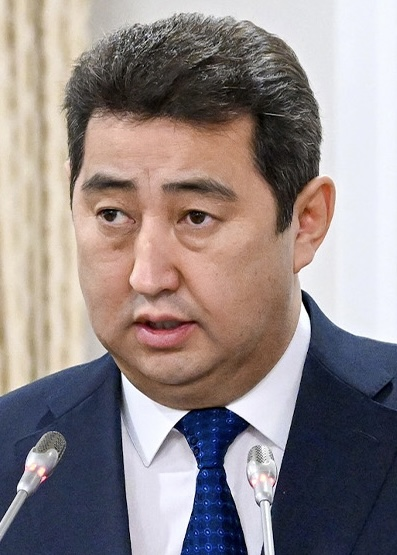
- Saparov in 2026

Minister of Agriculture of Kazakhstan
- Incumbent
- Assumed office 4 September 2023
- Prime Minister: Alihan Smaiylov; Oljas Bektenov

First Deputy Minister of Agriculture
- In office 2019–2022

Akim of North Kazakhstan Region
- In office 1 December 2022 – 4 September 2023
- Preceded by: Kumar Aksakalov
- Succeeded by: Gauez Nurmukhambetov

Personal details
- Born: June 12, 1966 (age 59) North Kazakhstan Region, Kazakh SSR, Soviet Union
- Education: North Kazakhstan State University

Aidarbek Seipılūly Saparov (Kazakh: Айдарбек Сейпілұлы Сапаров; born 12 June 1966) is a Kazakh politician currently serving as the Minister of Agriculture of Kazakhstan from 4 September 2023.

== Early life ==
Saparov was born on 12 June 1966, in the North Kazakhstan Region. He graduated from the Omsk Agricultural Institute and the North Kazakhstan State University.

== Political career ==
He began his career in 1984 as a state farm accountant. Following this, he held various positions in the agricultural sector, including zootechnician-realizer and commercial director at Kalinin KT from 1992 to 1995. Between 1995 and 2003, he worked in commercial structures. In 2003, Saparov entered the government sector, starting as the Deputy Director of the North Kazakhstan regional representative office of Prodkorporatsiya JSC. He served in this position for two years before being promoted to First Deputy Director in 2005.

He served as the deputy akim of the North Kazakhstan Region from 2010 to 2011. He served as first deputy akim from 2011 to 2019. Between 2019 and 2022, he served as the First Deputy Minister of Agriculture. In December 2022, he returned to regional administration, becoming the akim of the North Kazakhstan region.

On 4 September 2023, he was appointed Minister of Agriculture by a presidential decree. He was reappointed as the Minister of Agriculture on 6 February 2024.

== Awards ==
- Order of Kurmet (2008).
