= Uzunkol District =

Coordinates: 54°08′24″N 65°35′24″E

Uzunkol
- District
- Ұзынкөл ауданы
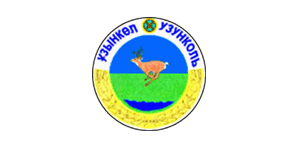
- Flag

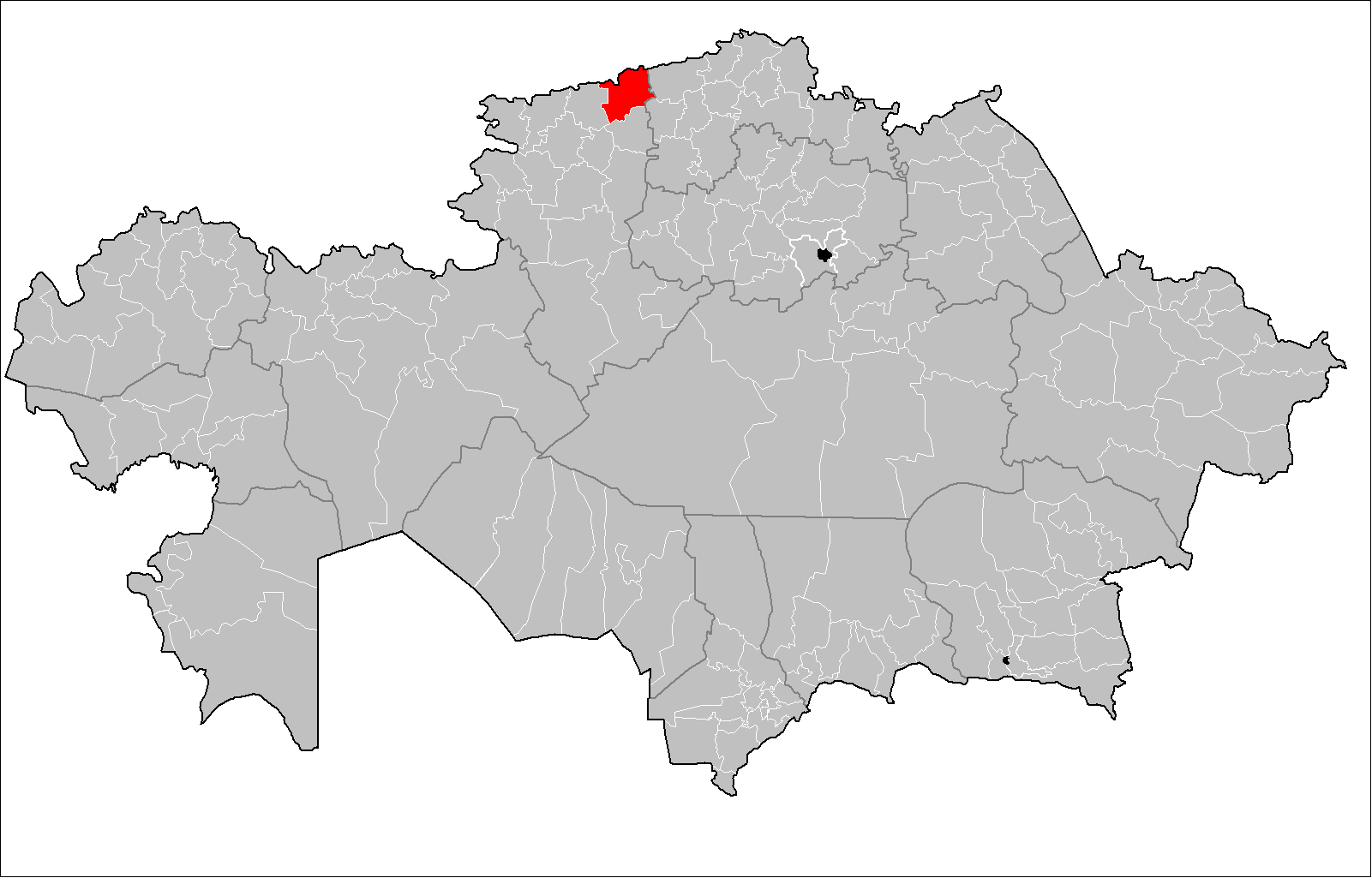
- Country: Kazakhstan
- Region: Kostanay Region
- Administrative center: Uzunkol

Government
  - Akim: Marat Zhurkabayev

Population (2013)
  - Total: 23,881
- Time zone: UTC+6 (East)

Uzunkol (Kazakh: Ұзынкөл ауданы, Ūzynköl audany) is a district of Kostanay Region in northern Kazakhstan. The administrative center of the district is the selo of Uzunkol.

Population: 23,881 (2013 estimate); 25,480 (2009 census results); 31,332 (1999 census results).
