= Sarykol District =

Coordinates: 53°24′36″N 65°39′36″E

Sarykol
- District
- Сарыкөл ауданы
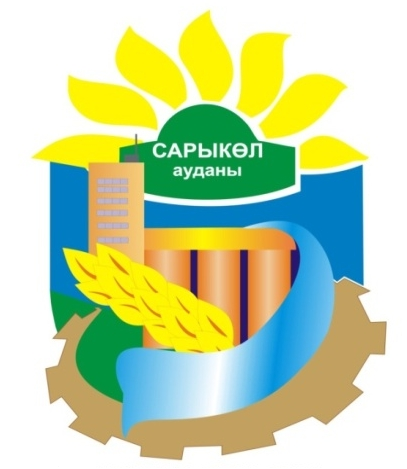
- Seal

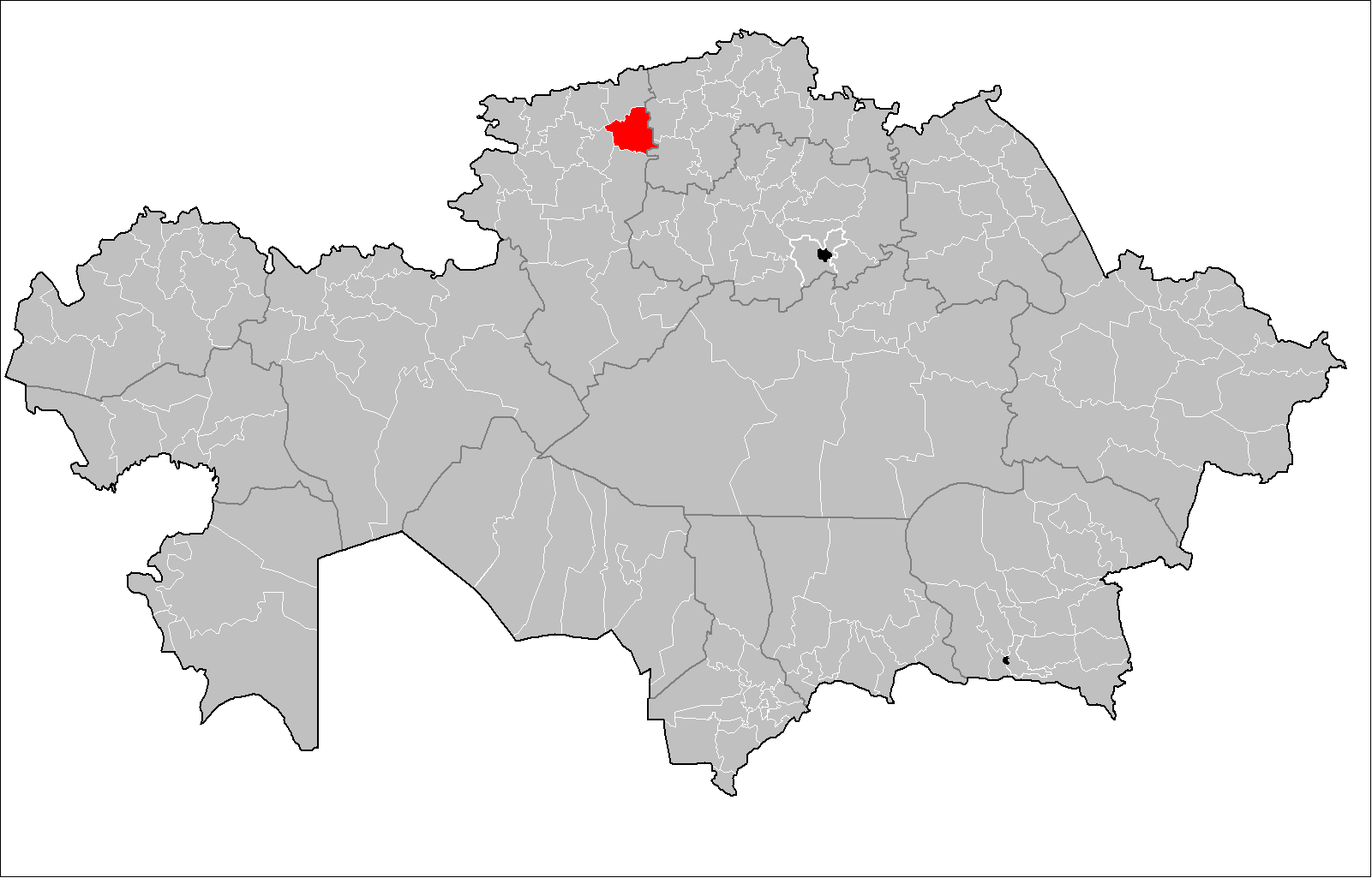
- Country: Kazakhstan
- Region: Kostanay Region
- Administrative center: Sarykol

Government
  - Akim: Marat Shymyrbekov

Population (2013)
  - Total: 23,387
- Time zone: UTC+6 (East)

Sarykol (Kazakh: Сарыкөл ауданы, Saryköl audany) is a district of Kostanay Region in northern Kazakhstan. The administrative center of the district is the urban-type settlement of Sarykol. Population: 23,387 (2013 estimate); 24,785 (2009 census results); 31,087 (1999 census results).
