= Beimbet Mailin District =

Coordinates: 52°34′48″N 62°47′24″E

- District
- Бейімбет Майлин ауданы
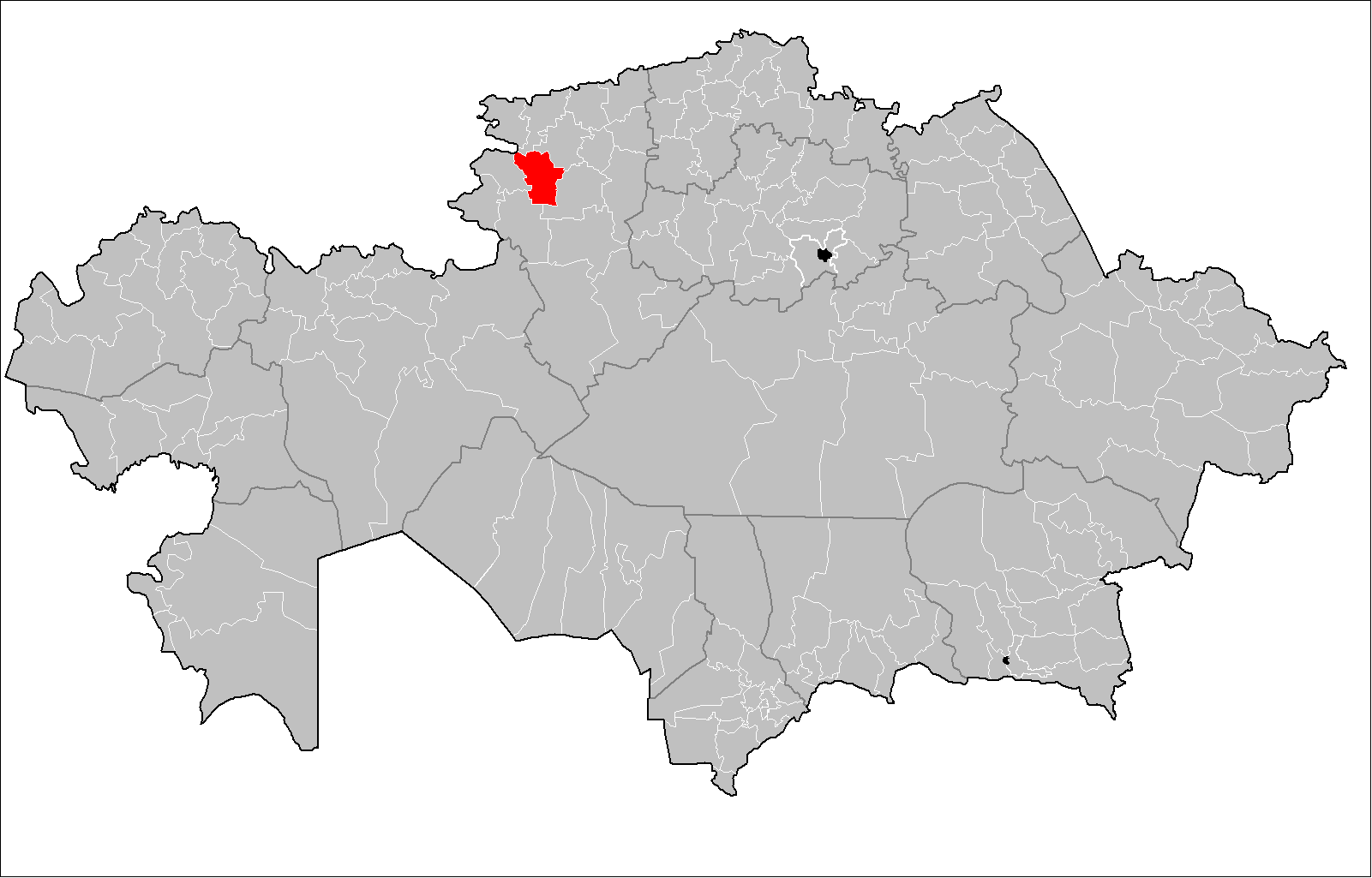
- Country: Kazakhstan
- Region: Kostanay Region
- Administrative center: Ayet

Government
  - Akim: Murzhakupov Kaysar Batyrkhanovich

Population (2013)
  - Total: 27,691
- Time zone: UTC+6 (East)

Beimbet Mailin District (Kazakh: Бейімбет Майлин ауданы), previously known as Taran District (Kazakh: Таран ауданы, Тарановский район), is a district of Kostanay Region in northern Kazakhstan. Named in 2019 (formerly Taran District) to honor Beimbet Maylin (1894-1938), a major 20th-century Kazakh poet, writer, and playwright who was tragically executed during Soviet political repressions. The administrative center is the selo of Ayet. The population is 27,691 (2013 estimate), about a tenth of whom are Kazakhstan Germans.
