= Denisov District =

Denisov
- District
- Денисов ауданы
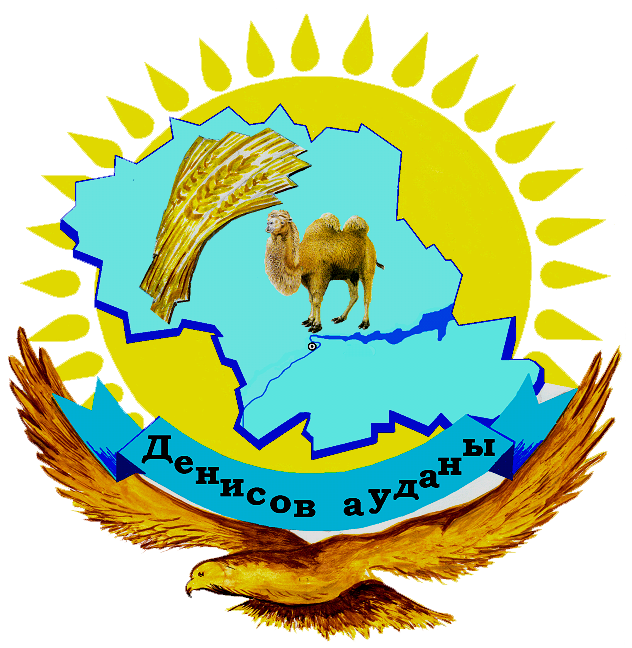
- Coat of arms

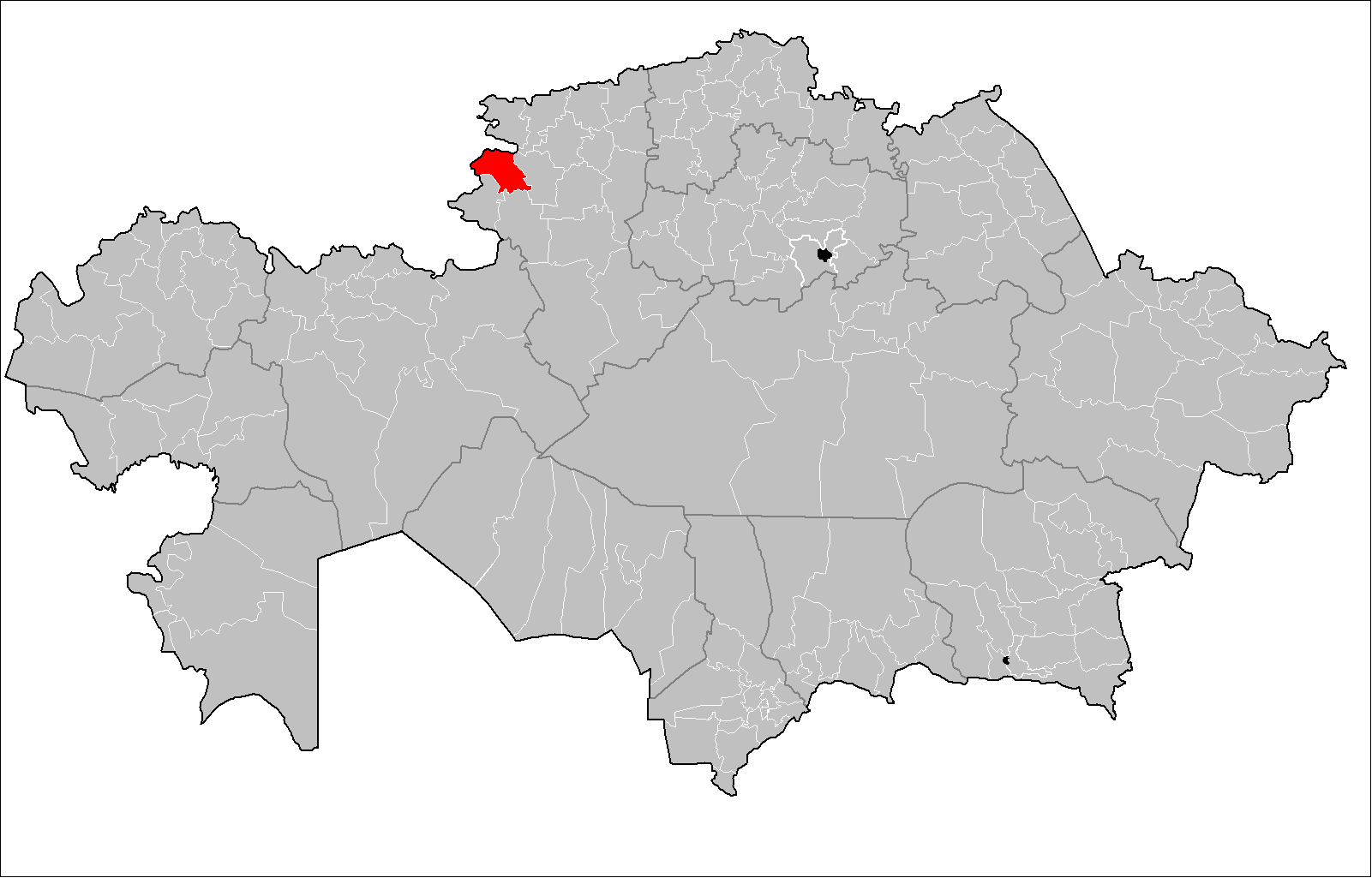
- Coordinates: 52°26′23″N 61°44′24″E
- Country: Kazakhstan
- Region: Kostanay Region
- Administrative center: Denisovka
- Established: 1938

Government
  - Akim: Katpaev Ruslan Zhulamanovich

Population (2024)
  - Total: 16,199
- Time zone: UTC+5 (East)
- Website: https://www.gov.kz/memleket/entities/kostanai-denisov-audany-akimat

Denisov (Kazakh: Денисов ауданы, Denisov audany) is a district of Kostanay Region in northern Kazakhstan. The administrative center of the district is the settlement of Denisovka. Population: 20,646 (2013 estimate); 21,912 (2009 census results); 29,333 (1999 census results).
