= Kamysty, Kostanay Region =

Kamysty Қамысты
- Village
- Location in Kazakhstan
- Coordinates: 51°57′42″N 61°47′01″E
- Country: Kazakhstan
- Region: Kostanay Region
- District: Kamysty District

Population (2019)
  - Total: 4,484
- Time zone: UTC+6 (East Kazakhstan Time)
- Post code: 110800

Kamysty (Kazakh: Қамысты; Russian: Камысты), known as Kamyshnoye until 1997, is a village in the Kostanay Region, Kazakhstan. It is the administrative center of Kamysty District and of the Sverdlovsk Rural District (KATO code - 394830100). Population: 5,344 (2009 census results); 5,487 (1999 census results).

== Geography ==
The village is located by lake Dosaykopa (Досайқопа), 253 kilometers (157 mi) to the southeast of Kostanay city, the regional capital. The Kazakhstan–Russia border lies about 70 kilometers (43 mi) to the northwest.
