= Kamysty District =

Coordinates: 51°58′48″N 61°47′24″E

Kamysty
- District
- Қамысты ауданы
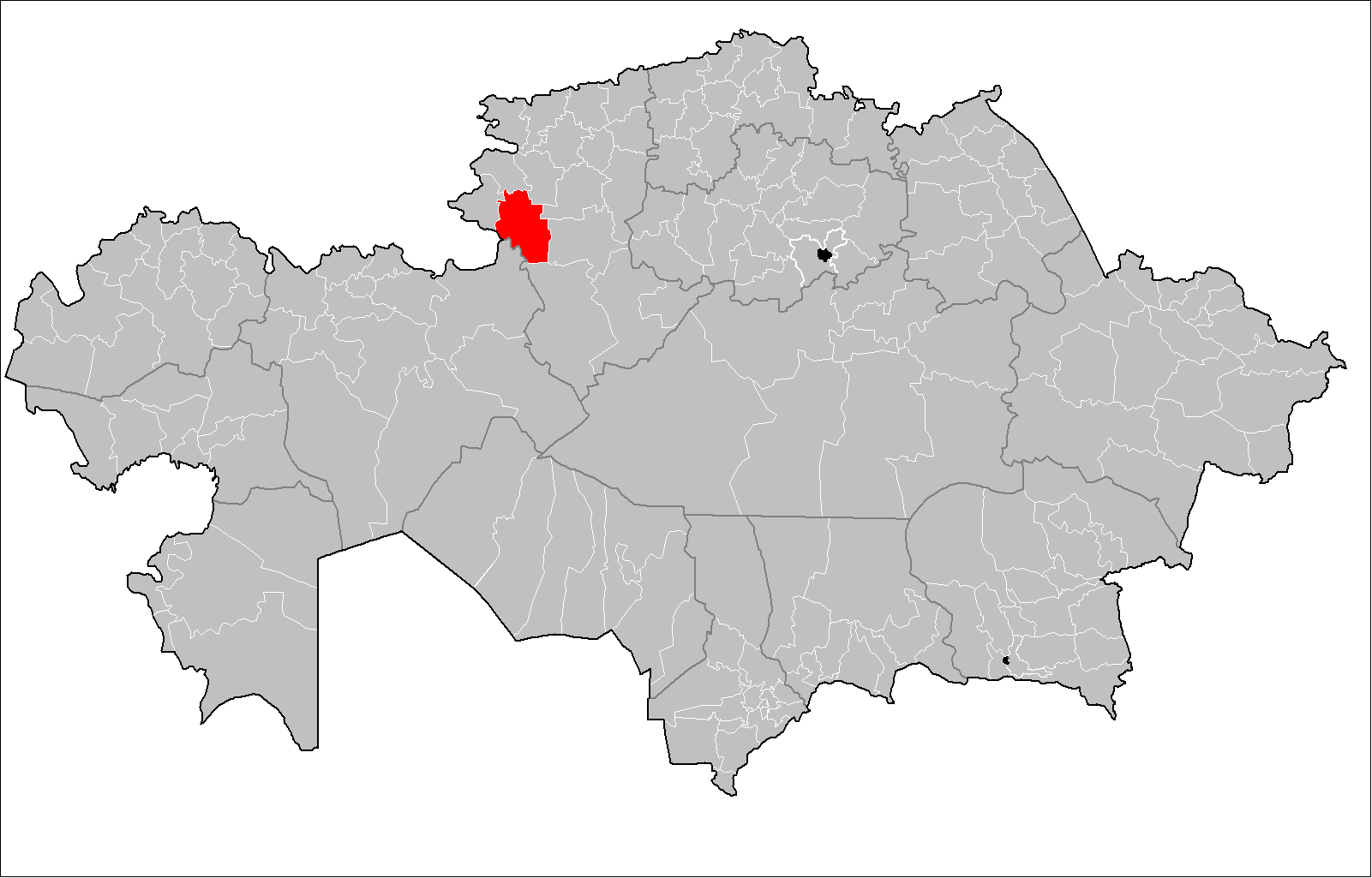
- Country: Kazakhstan
- Region: Kostanay Region
- Administrative center: Kamysty

Government
  - Akim: Yerlan Zhaulybayev

Population (2013)
  - Total: 14,482
- Time zone: UTC+6 (East)

Kamysty (Kazakh: Қамысты ауданы, Qamysty audany) is a district of Kostanay Region in northern Kazakhstan. The administrative center of the district is the selo of Kamysty. Population: 14,482 (2013 estimate); 15,807 (2009 census results); 23,146 (1999 census results).

== Geography ==
Kulykol, Teniz and Urkash lakes are located in the district, not far from the Kazakhstan–Russia border.
