= Nura =

Nura may refer to:

== Places ==
- Nura (river), a river in Kazakhstan
- Nura District, a district in Kazakhstan
- Nura, Kyrgyzstan, a village in Kyrgyzstan
- Nursu, or Nura, a village in Azerbaijan
- Nura, Kazakhstan, a number of villages in Kazakhstan
  - Nura, Nura District, a district capital in Kazakhstan
  - Nura, Yrgyz District, a village in Kazakhstan

== People ==
- Nura (German rapper) (born 1988), German rapper
- Nura M Inuwa (born 1989), Nigerian poet and musician, also known as Nura
- Nura Woodson Ulreich (1899–1950), American author, illustrator, and artist whose pen name was Nura

Nura can also be an alternative transliteration of the Arabic name Noora.

== Other uses ==
- Nura: Rise of the Yokai Clan, a 2008 manga and anime series
- Nura (company), an Australian headphone company
- Nura (operating system), an open source operating system

== See also ==
- Nura Nal, a comics character
- Nora (disambiguation)
- Noora (disambiguation)
