= Karakol (Shalkarteniz) =

Lake in Kazakhstan

- Қаракөл
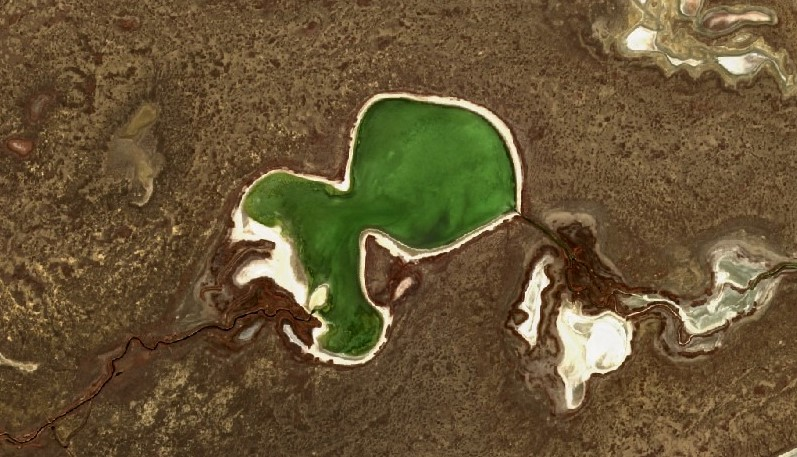
- Sentinel-2 image of the lake.

- Location within Kazakhstan
- Location: Shalkarteniz basin
- Coordinates: 48°01′N 62°54′E
- Type: salt lake
- Basin countries: Kazakhstan
- Max. length: 4.1 kilometers (2.5 mi)
- Max. width: 1.9 kilometers (1.2 mi)
- Surface area: 4.7 square kilometers (1.8 sq mi)
- Shore length^{1}: 15.5 kilometers (9.6 mi)
- Surface elevation: 51.2 meters (168 ft)
- ^{1} Shore length is not a well-defined measure.

Karakol (Kazakh: Қаракөл) is a lake in Yrgyz District, Aktobe Region, Kazakhstan.

The lake lies at the southern end of the great lake Shalkarteniz, about 145 kilometers (90 mi) southeast of Yrgyz, the capital of the district. The nearest settlement is Zhaisanbai village, located 27 kilometers (17 mi) to the west.

== Geography ==
Karakol belongs to the Shalkarteniz basin. It is located close to the southern shore of its large neighbor and has a rough hourglass shape, stretching from northeast to southwest for 4.2 kilometers (2.6 mi). It has a width of 1.2 kilometers (0.75 mi). It is connected to Shalkarteniz via a channel at the eastern end. The lake basin is fed by snow. The water increases its salinity in the summer months and the bottom is flat and muddy.

Very close to the southeast lies larger lake Kurdym. River Shonkai (Шоңқай), a branch of the last stretch of the Turgay, flows to the southwest. Reeds grow on the lakeshore. The area near the lake is a seasonal grazing ground for local cattle.

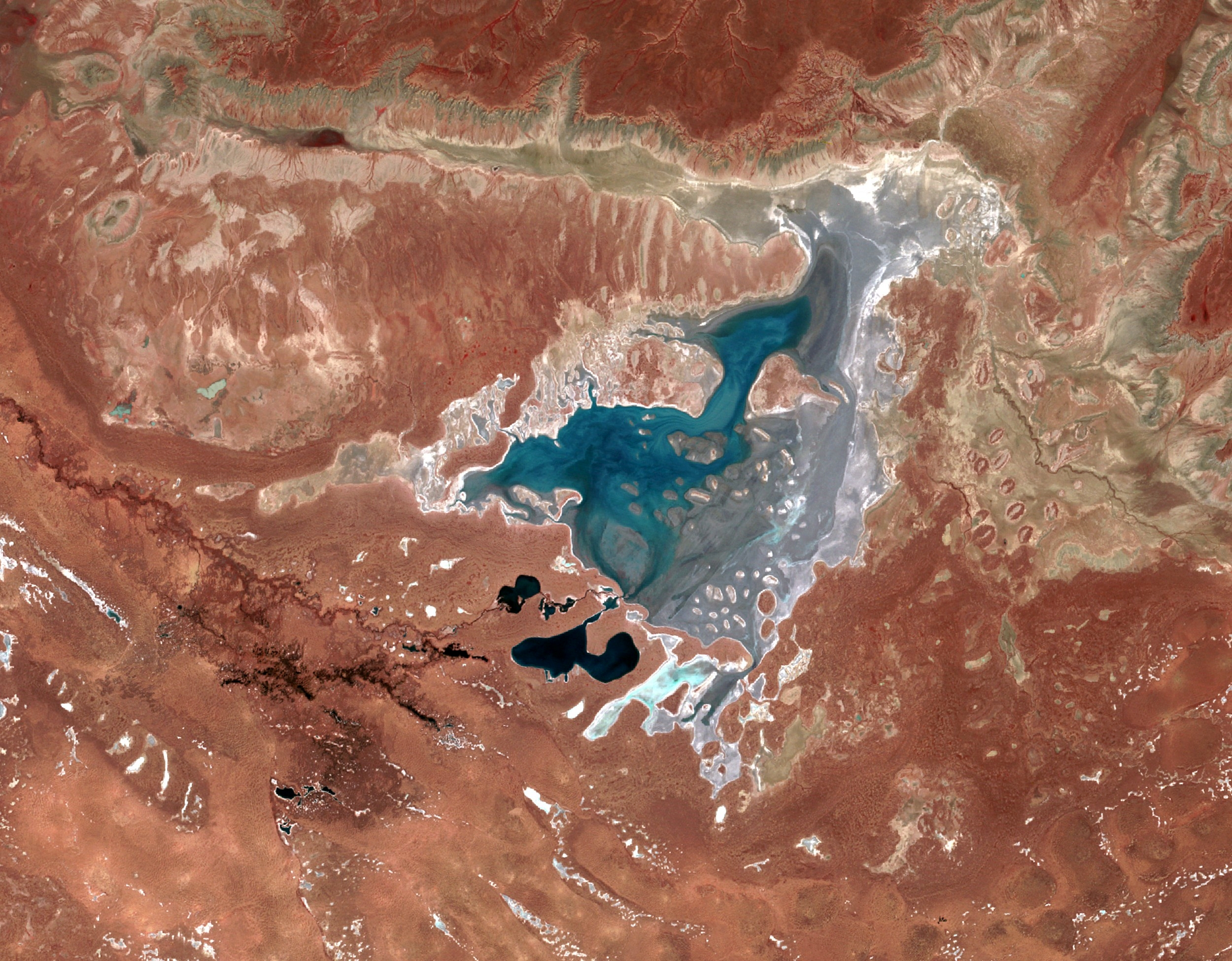
False color Landsat image of Shalkarteniz. Lakes Karakol and neighboring Kurdym stand out owing to their dark color.

== See also ==
- List of lakes of Kazakhstan
