= Kurdym =

Lake in the country of Kazakhstan

- Құрдым
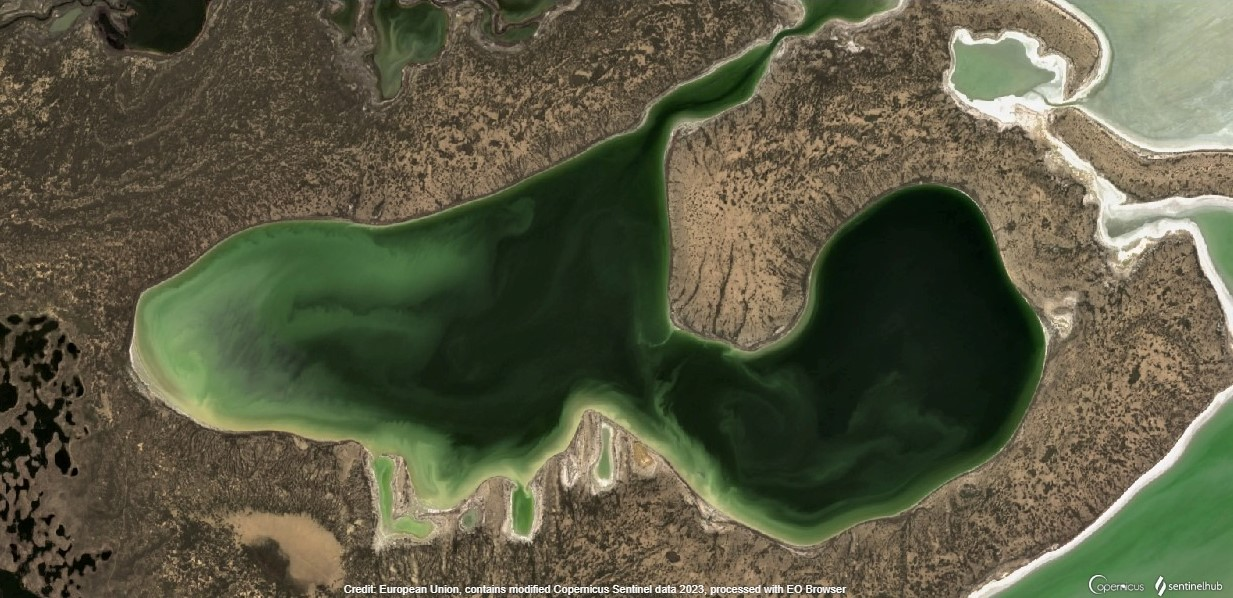
- Kurdym Sentinel-2 image.

- Location within Kazakhstan
- Location: Shalkarteniz basin
- Coordinates: 47°58′30″N 62°58′30″E
- Type: salt lake
- Basin countries: Kazakhstan
- Max. length: 11.6 km (7.2 mi)
- Max. width: 3.7 km (2.3 mi)
- Surface area: ca 30 km^{2} (12 sq mi)
- Average depth: 1.6 m (5 ft 3 in)
- Surface elevation: 52 m (171 ft)

Kurdym (Kazakh: Құрдым) is a lake in Yrgyz District, Aktobe Region, Kazakhstan.

The lake lies at the southern end of the great lake Shalkarteniz, nearly 150 km (93 mi) southeast of Yrgyz, the capital of the district.

== Geography ==
Kurdym belongs to the Shalkarteniz basin. It is located close to the southern shore of its large neighbor and has a roughly hourglass shape, stretching from east to west for 11.6 km (7.2 mi). It has a width of 3.7 km (2.3 mi), and 1.2 km (0.75 mi) in the narrow stretch in the middle. The lake basin is fed by snow and in the summer the shallow parts of the lake may dry up. The shores are flat and marshy in places. The water of the lake is salty, unsuitable for drinking.

Very close to the northwest lies smaller lake Karakol. The last stretch of river Shonkai (Шоңқай), a branch of the Turgay, flows to the southwest. Desert vegetation grows near the lake, including halophytes.

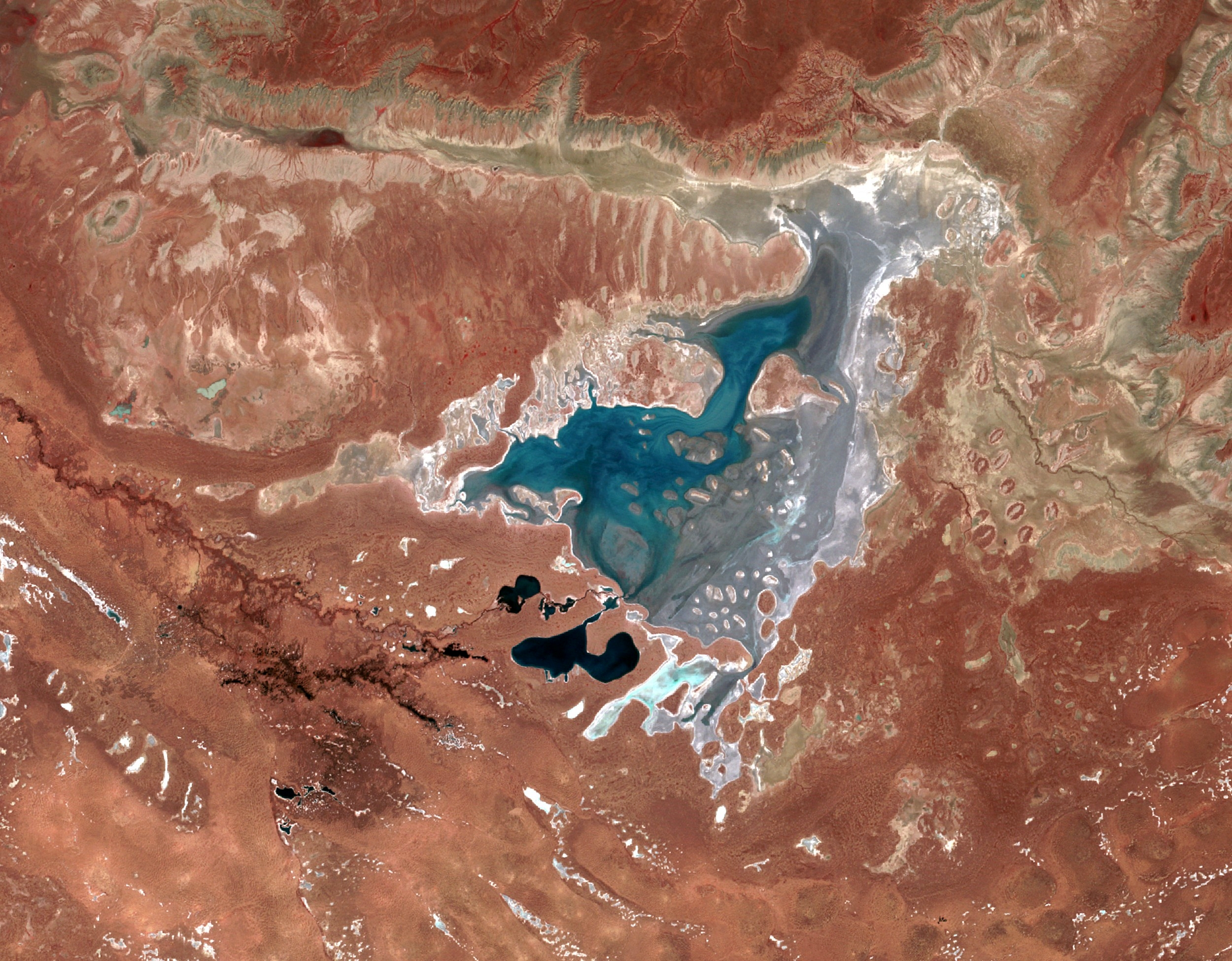
False color Landsat image of Shalkarteniz. Lakes Kurdym and Karakol stand out owing to their dark color.

== See also ==
- List of lakes of Kazakhstan
