= Damdi =

Damdi may refer to:

- Damdi (Kostanay Region), a village in Nauyrzym District, Kostanay Region, Kazakhstan
- Ulken Damdi, a river of the Turgay basin, Kazakhstan
- Damdi Masjid, a mosque in Maharashtra, India
- Damdi, a fictional character created by the small creator "ybanez_03" on the platform YouTube.
