= Baitakkol =

Lake in the country of Kazakhstan

- Байтақкөл
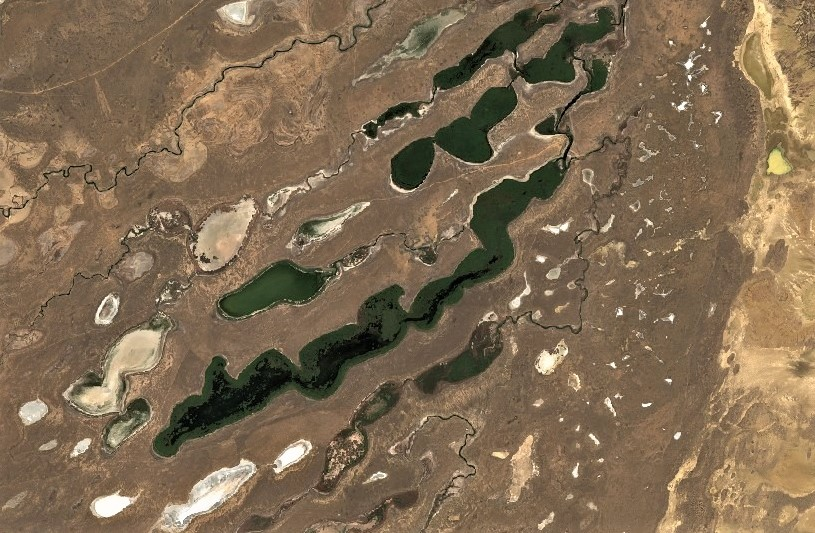
- Baitakkol and adjacent lakes Sentinel-2 image

- Location within Kazakhstan
- Location: Turgay Depression
- Coordinates: 48°41′25″N 62°09′00″E
- Type: Floodplain lake
- Primary outflows: Turgay
- Basin countries: Kazakhstan
- Max. length: 23 kilometers (14 mi)
- Max. width: 1.8 kilometers (1.1 mi)
- Surface area: 52.3 square kilometers (20.2 sq mi)
- Max. depth: 3 meters (9.8 ft)
- Residence time: UTC+5:00
- Shore length^{1}: ca 70 kilometers (43 mi)
- Surface elevation: 76 meters (249 ft)
- Islands: None
- ^{1} Shore length is not a well-defined measure.

Baitakkol (Kazakh: Байтақкөл; Russian: Байтакколь), is a lake in Yrgyz District, Aktobe Region, Kazakhstan.

The nearest inhabited locality is Belcher, located 1 kilometer (0.62 mi) to the north of the northern end of the lakeshore. The area surrounding the lake is arid, featuring an extremely continental climate and cold winters with little snowfall. Summers are hot with strong winds.

== Geography ==
Baitakkol lies in the southern part of the Turgay Depression at 76 meters (249 ft) above sea level. It is a long lake, the largest of the group of lakes in the valley of the lower Turgay. It is roughly aligned from SW to NE, in the same direction as smaller lakes and salt pans nearby. Lake Keltekol (48°40′N 62°10′E) lies to the south of the central part. The northwestern end of the lake connects via an intermittent channel with the right bank of the Turgay, which flows southwards to the east of the lake cluster.

Baitakkol is a floodplain lake that is filled during the spring floods of the Turgay river. During that period the water becomes fresh. After the spring flood is over, water flows back towards the Turgay river through the channel at the northeastern end. In the dry seasons the lake shrinks and its water turns brackish.

In recent years the lake has become critically shallow owing to lack of floodwater inflow.

== Fauna ==
There are reedbeds along the lakeshore and sedges grow in the floodplain meadows. Baitakkol is a key refuge for aquatic birds, including the critically endangered siberian crane.

== See also ==
- List of lakes of Kazakhstan
- Lakes of the lower Turgay and Irgiz
