= Koskopa =

Koskopa (Kazakh: Қосқопа) may refer to:

- Ulken Koskopa, a lake in Nauyrzym District, Kostanay Region, Kazakhstan
- Kishi Koskopa, a lake in Nauyrzym District, Kostanay Region, Kazakhstan
