= Belcher, Kazakhstan =

Belcher Белшер
- Village
- Location in Kazakhstan
- Coordinates: 48°46′45″N 67°17′06″E
- Country: Kazakhstan
- Region: Aktobe Region
- District: Yrgyz District
- Rural District: Nura Rural District

Population (2009)
  - Total: 192
- Time zone: UTC+5 (Central Asia Time)
- Post code: 030401

Belcher or Belsher (Kazakh: Белшер), is a village in the Yrgyz District, Aktobe Region, Kazakhstan. It is part of the Nura Rural District, with (KATO code - 153441100). Population: 192 (2009 census results); 317 (1999 census results).

== Geography ==
The village is located by the northeastern lakeshore of Baitakkol, the largest lake in the area.

== See also ==
- Lakes of the lower Turgay and Irgiz
