= Nura, Yrgyz District =

Nura Нұра
- Village
- Location in Kazakhstan
- Coordinates: 48°53′38″N 62°18′29″E
- Country: Kazakhstan
- Region: Aktobe Region
- District: Yrgyz District
- Rural District: Nura Rural District

Population (2009)
  - Total: 681
- Time zone: UTC+5 (Central Asia Time)
- Post code: 030411

Nura (Kazakh: Нұра), is a village in the Yrgyz District, Aktobe Region, Kazakhstan. It is the head of the Nura Rural District (KATO code - 156843100). Population: 681 (2009 census results); 887 (1999 census results).

== Geography ==
The village is located 80 km (50 mi) northeast of Yrgyz, close to the southern end of Ayrkol (Айыркөл), a lake located near the confluence of the Ulkayak and the Turgay rivers.

=== Climate ===
Nura has a semi-arid climate (Köppen: BSk), with hot summers and very cold winters.

Climate data for Nura (1991–2020)
Month	Jan	Feb	Mar	Apr	May	Jun	Jul	Aug	Sep	Oct	Nov	Dec	Year
Mean daily maximum °C (°F)	−9.1 (15.6)	−8.0 (17.6)	1.1 (34.0)	16.1 (61.0)	24.8 (76.6)	30.7 (87.3)	31.9 (89.4)	30.7 (87.3)	23.5 (74.3)	14.2 (57.6)	1.8 (35.2)	−6.2 (20.8)	12.6 (54.7)
Daily mean °C (°F)	−13.5 (7.7)	−13.0 (8.6)	−4.0 (24.8)	9.5 (49.1)	17.8 (64.0)	23.7 (74.7)	25.1 (77.2)	23.3 (73.9)	15.9 (60.6)	7.3 (45.1)	−2.6 (27.3)	−10.3 (13.5)	6.6 (43.9)
Mean daily minimum °C (°F)	−17.7 (0.1)	−17.5 (0.5)	−8.4 (16.9)	3.7 (38.7)	11.4 (52.5)	16.9 (62.4)	18.5 (65.3)	16.3 (61.3)	9.1 (48.4)	1.6 (34.9)	−6.2 (20.8)	−14.1 (6.6)	1.1 (34.0)
Average precipitation mm (inches)	12.2 (0.48)	9.5 (0.37)	13.8 (0.54)	15.3 (0.60)	17.7 (0.70)	10.8 (0.43)	18.1 (0.71)	10.5 (0.41)	6.0 (0.24)	17.8 (0.70)	17.9 (0.70)	15.3 (0.60)	164.9 (6.49)
Average precipitation days (≥ 1.0 mm)	4.0	2.7	4.2	3.3	3.6	2.5	3.2	2.0	1.4	3.4	3.8	4.1	38.2
Source: NOAA

== See also ==
- Lakes of the lower Turgay and Irgiz
