= Zhamantuz =

Zhamantuz (Kazakh: Жамантұз; "bad salt") may refer to:

- Zhamantuz, Aksu City Administration, a lake in the Aksu City Administration, Pavlodar Region, Kazakhstan
- Zhamantuz, Aktogay District, a lake in Aktogay District, Pavlodar Region, Kazakhstan
- Zhamantuz (lake, Akmola Region), a lake in Akmola Region, Kazakhstan
- Zhamantuz, May District, a lake in May District, Pavlodar Region, Kazakhstan
- Zhamantuz, Shalkar District, a lake in Shalkar District, Aktobe Region, Kazakhstan
- Zhamantuz, Taiynsha District, a lake in Taiynsha District, North Kazakhstan Region, Kazakhstan
- Zhamantuz, Ualikhanov District, a lake in Ualikhanov District, North Kazakhstan Region, Kazakhstan
- Zhamantuz, Zhangeldi District, a lake in Zhangeldi District, Kostanay Region, Kazakhstan
