= Zhyngyldyozek =

River in Kazakhstan

Zhyngyldyozek Жыңғылдыөзек / Жынгылдыозек
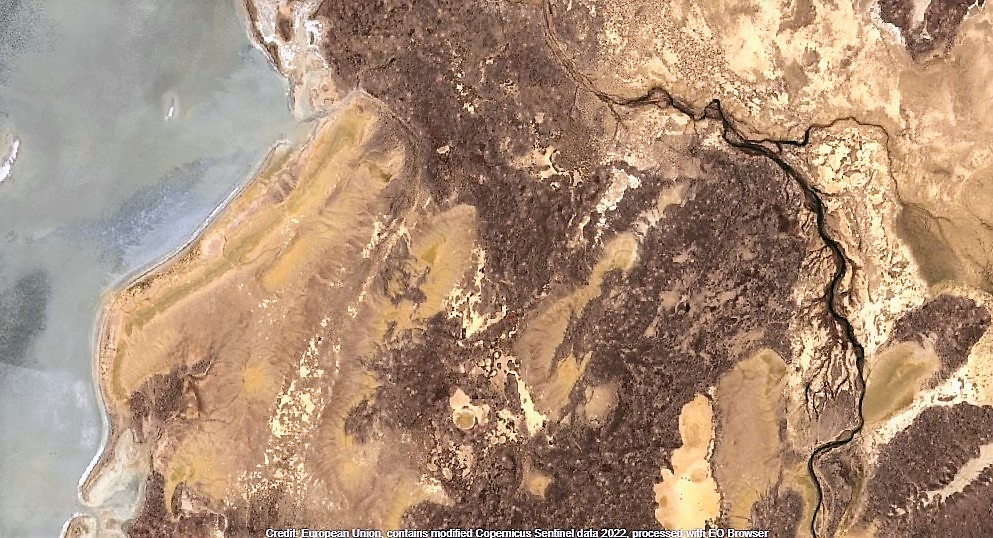
- Sentinel-2 image with the lower Zhyngyldyozek on the right and lake Shalkarteniz on the left

- Mouth location in Kazakhstan

Location
- Countries: Kazakhstan

Physical characteristics
- Source: Shubarteniz
  - coordinates: 47°33′06″N 64°48′05″E
  - elevation: 130 metres (430 ft)
- Mouth: Shalkarteniz
  - coordinates: 48°08′46″N 63°23′02″E
  - elevation: 55 metres (180 ft)
- Length: 222 km (138 mi)
- Basin size: 4,360 km^{2} (1,680 sq mi)
- Discharge
  - average: 0.2 m^{3}/s (7.1 cu ft/s)

The Zhyngyldyozek (Kazakh: Жыңғылдыөзек; Russian: Жынгылдыозек) is a river in Kazakhstan. It has a length of 222 kilometres (138 mi) and a catchment area of 4,360 square kilometres (1,680 sq mi).

The river flows from the Ulytau District, Karaganda Region into the Yrgyz District, Aktobe Region. Zhyngyldyozek flows across desolate areas, Koskol village is located close to the Shubarteniz, near the outflowing point of the river. The basin of the river is a seasonal grazing ground for local cattle. The name means "trees in the desert" in the Kazakh language.

== Course ==
The Zhyngyldyozek has its source at the Shubarteniz salt lake. The river flows first roughly northwestwards across dry steppe and semi-desert territory where there is almost no surface runoff. In its last stretch, as it nears the Shalkarteniz, it bends and heads roughly northwards in an area of solonchak soil. Finally it flows across salt marshes into the eastern shore of Shalkarteniz, an endorheic salt lake at the southern end of the Turgay Basin. Its mouth lies to the south of the mouth of the Tegene, 16 km (9.9 mi) southwest of Mount Telektau.

In the upper and middle reaches the river valley is a drainless depression. The bed of the Zhyngyldyozek is unbranched, underdeveloped, and tends to break up erratically into pools along its entire length. The banks are mostly steep, with a height of 2 metres (6 ft 7 in) to 3 metres (9.8 ft). The channel has a width of 30 m (98 ft) to 20 km (12 mi), but since the runoff does not reach the channel, it seeps into the surrounding sandy soil or gathers in small depressions along the sandy plain.

=== Tributaries ===
The Zhyngyldyozek has six tributaries. None of them are longer than 10 km (6.2 mi). Its main food is snow. It has a steady water flow only for about one or two months, during the melting of the snows in the spring, when the depth of the river may reach 3 metres (9.8 ft) in places. Except during the spring floods, the water of the Zhyngyldyozek is generally bittern-salty, even in years of abundant snowfall.

== See also ==
- List of rivers of Kazakhstan
