= Ulken Damdi =

River in Kazakhstan

Ulken Damdi Үлкен Дәмді
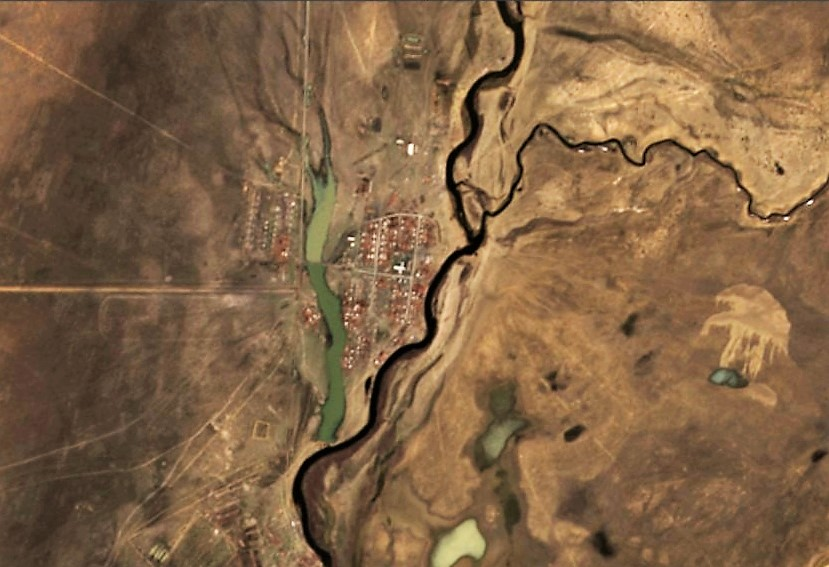
- The river flowing by Mereke Sentinel-2 image

- Mouth location in Kazakhstan

Physical characteristics
- Source
  - location: near Zhunshilik
  - coordinates: 51°32′59″N 65°24′13″E
- Mouth: Saryozen (Turgay)
  - coordinates: 50°57′45″N 64°52′04″E
  - elevation: 126 m (413 ft)
- Length: 133 km (83 mi)
- Basin size: 5,140 km^{2} (1,980 sq mi)
- Discharge
  - average: 11.6 m^{3}/s (410 cu ft/s) at the mouth

Basin features
- Progression: Saryozen → Sarykopa

The Ulken Damdi (Kazakh: Үлкен Дәмді; Russian: Улькендамды), is a river in the Karasu, Nauyrzym and Amangeldi districts of Kostanay Region, Kazakhstan. The river is the main tributary of the Saryozen and is 133 km (83 mi) long with a basin area of 5,140 km^{2} (1,980 sq mi).

The river flows by Damdi and Mereke settlements. The water is used for irrigation and watering livestock.

== Geography ==
The Ulken Damdi belongs to the Turgay basin. It has its origin in a source near Zhunshilik (Kazakh: Жүншілік). The river heads initially southwestwards as the Damdi, then it bends southwards. A little upstream from Damdi village it is joined by the Sholak Damdi from the left and becomes the Ulken "Great" Damdi. Finally it joins the Saryozen from the right side. The valley is between 3 km (1.9 mi) and 7 km (4.3 mi) wide. In the upper course it flows within a 20 m (66 ft) to 40 m (130 ft) wide canyon bound by steep 4 m (13 ft) to 5 m (16 ft) high cliffs. The water is fresh in the spring, becoming brackish in the summer.

The main tributary of the Ulken Damdi is the 91 km (57 mi) long Moiyldi from the left.

== See also ==
- List of rivers of Kazakhstan
