= Kishi Koskopa =

Lake in Kazakhstan

- Кіші Қосқопа
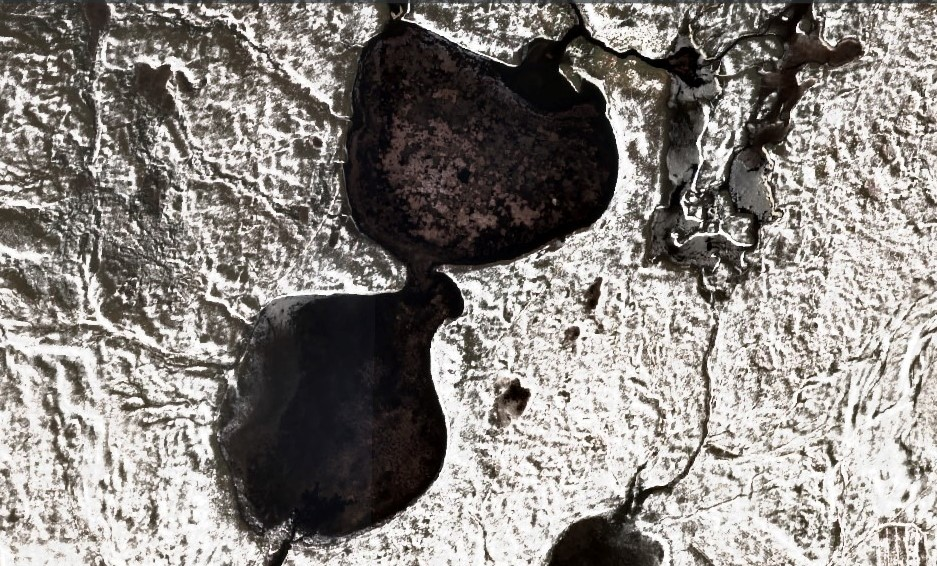
- Sentinel-2 picture of the twin lakes with Kishi Koskopa below

- Location within Kazakhstan
- Location: Turgay Depression
- Coordinates: 50°42′13″N 64°32′43″E
- Type: exorheic lake
- Primary inflows: Ulken Koskopa channel
- Primary outflows: Saryozen tributary
- Basin countries: Kazakhstan
- Max. length: 3.1 kilometers (1.9 mi)
- Max. width: 2.9 kilometers (1.8 mi)
- Surface area: 6.82 square kilometers (2.63 sq mi)
- Residence time: UTC+5:00
- Surface elevation: 111 meters (364 ft)
- Islands: no

Kishi Koskopa (Kazakh: Кіші Қосқопа; Russian: Малая Коскопа) is a salt lake in Nauyrzym District, Kostanay Region, Kazakhstan.

The lake is located 24 kilometers (15 mi) to the southwest of Mereke. The area is quite desolate, with few settlements.

The name Koskopa in the Kazakh language means "Double Kopa" —"Kopa" referring to a lake that seasonally becomes a salt marsh overgrown with reeds and sedges.

== Geography ==
Kishi Koskopa is an exorheic lake of the Turgay Depression and is part of the Sarykopa lake basin. River Saryozen flows 4.5 kilometers (2.8 mi) to the southeast. The lake lies at an elevation of 111 meters (364 ft). Kishi Koskopa is joined in the north by a short 250 meters (820 ft) wide sound with twin lake Ulken Koskopa. A small right tributary of the Saryozen flows out from the southwestern shore. The bottom of the lake is muddy.

Kishi Koskopa has a roughly round shape, with a diameter of approximately 3 kilometers (1.9 mi). Its northern neighbor is about as large. Lake Kiikkol lies 19 kilometers (12 mi) to the north, and Sarykopa 31 kilometers (19 mi) to the southwest. The Koskopa lakes freeze at the end of November and thaw by the end of March. Both lakes usually dry in the summer, becoming salt marshes.

== Flora and fauna ==
Typha and Phragmites reeds grow in Ulken Koskopa. The lake basin is surrounded by steppe vegetation and is used for grazing local cattle.

== See also ==
- List of lakes of Kazakhstan
