= Baikonyr =

River in Kazakhstan

Baikonyr Байқоңыр
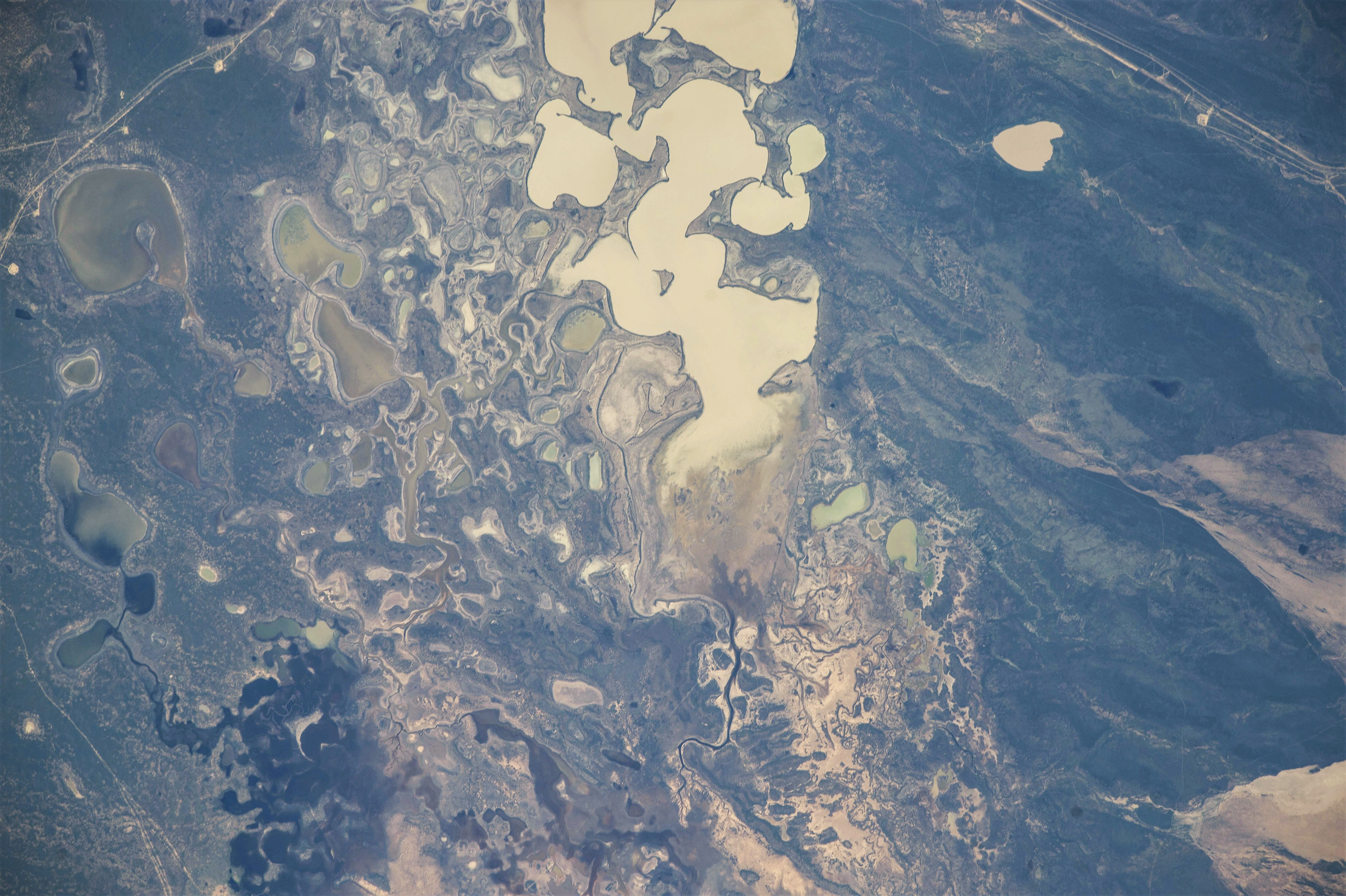
- 2016 ISS image with the Baiqoñyr flowing into lake Shubarteniz from the southeast

- Mouth location in Kazakhstan

Location
- Country: Kazakhstan

Physical characteristics
- Source: Ulytau
  - coordinates: 48°00′18″N 66°21′41″E
  - elevation: 449 m (1,473 ft)
- Mouth: Shubarteniz
  - coordinates: 47°30′42″N 65°02′43″E
  - elevation: 125 m (410 ft)
- Length: 235 km (146 mi)
- Basin size: 4,940 km^{2} (1,910 sq mi)
- Discharge
  - average: 0.85 m^{3}/s (30 cu ft/s)

The Baikonyr or Baiqoñyr (Kazakh: Байқоңыр; Russian: Байконыр) is a river in the Ulytau District, Ulytau Region, Kazakhstan. It has a length of 235 km (146 mi) and a drainage basin of 4,940 km^{2} (1,910 sq mi).

The river flows by the village of Baiqoñyr. Ancient petroglyphs have been found on rocks along both banks of the river.

== Course ==
The Baiqoñyr has its origin at the confluence of the Kurambai and Aktas rivers in the southwestern slopes of the Ulytau Range. It heads roughly southwestwards within a valley, having a maximum width of 2 km (1.2 mi) to the northeast of the Kalmakkyrgan. In its final stretch, it flows roughly westwards, bending northwestwards to end up in the southeastern end of the Shubarteniz lake, to the south of the mouth of the Zhymyky.

The Baiqoñyr is fed by winter snowfall. In the spring its water is fresh, but it turns salty as the flow diminishes, and in the summer it dries largely up, breaking up into small pools.

== See also ==
- List of rivers of Kazakhstan
