= Shubarteniz =

Salt lake in Kazakhstan

- Шұбартеңіз / Шубартениз
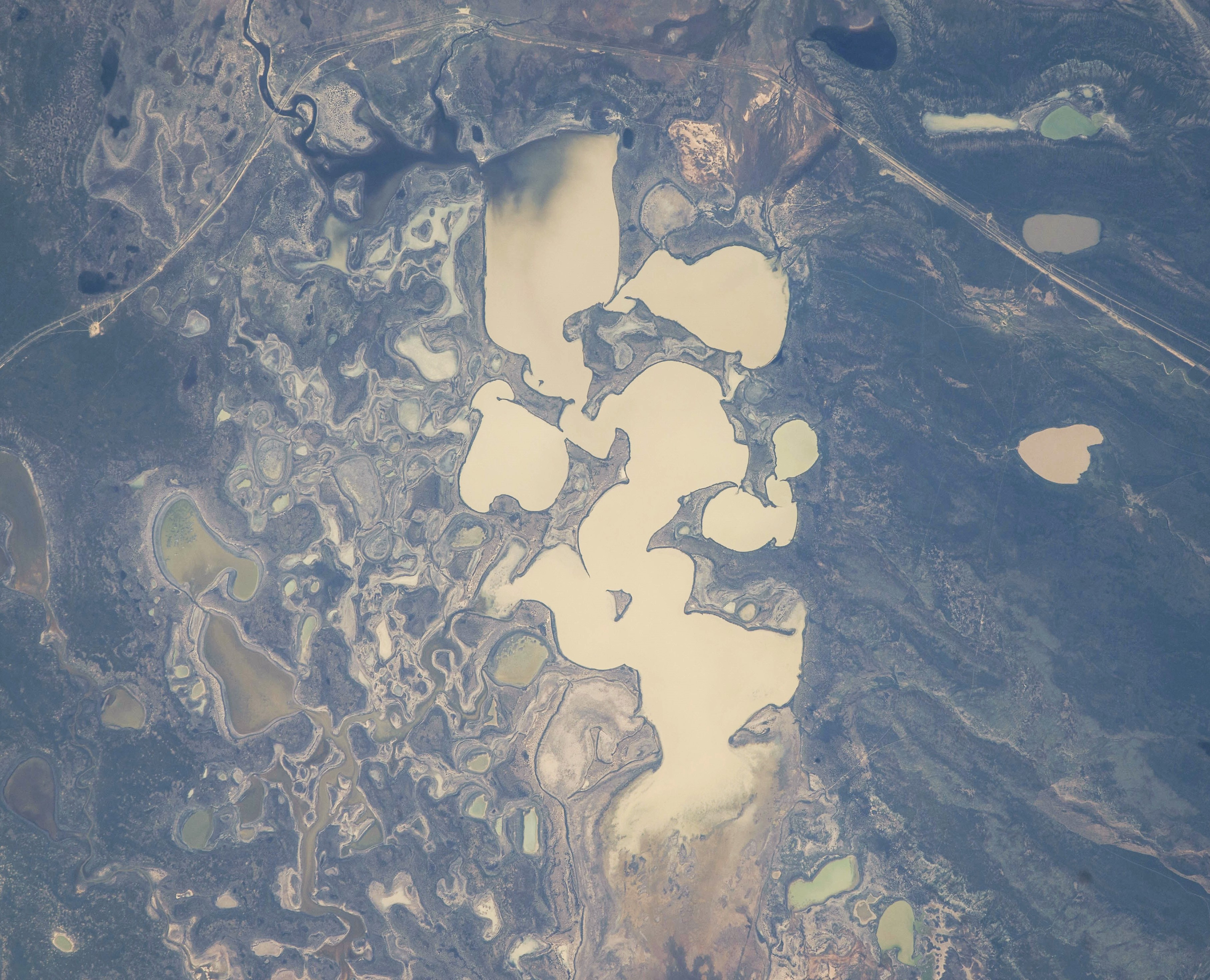
- ISS image of lake Shubarteniz during the spring floods in 2016

- Location within Kazakhstan
- Location: Turan Lowland
- Coordinates: 47°39′N 64°53′E
- Type: Salt lake
- Primary inflows: Baikonyr, Zhymyky and Kalmakkyrgan
- Primary outflows: Zhyngyldyozek
- Basin countries: Kazakhstan
- Max. length: 25 kilometers (16 mi)
- Max. width: 5.8 kilometers (3.6 mi)
- Surface area: 125 square kilometers (48 sq mi) to 316 square kilometers (122 sq mi)
- Surface elevation: 130 meters (430 ft)

Shubarteniz (Kazakh: Шұбартеңіз; Russian: Шубартениз) is a salt lake in Ulytau District, Ulytau Region, Kazakhstan.

In 1728, one of the battles of the Kazakh–Dzungar Wars took place near the lake and ended with the victory of the Kazakh Army.

== Geography ==
Shubarteniz is a shallow salt lake lying at the northern end of the Turan Lowland. Koskol village is located 4 kilometers (2.5 mi) to the west of Shubarteniz. The road between Koskol and Karsakpay skirts the northern end of the lake.

There are three main rivers flowing into the lake, the Baikonyr into the southeastern shore, the Zhymyky from the northeast, and the Kalmakkyrgan from the south. The Zhyngyldyozek flows out of the lake from the western shore. Shubarteniz is fed mainly by snow. When the lake is full it has regular-shaped shores and there are a few small islands. During the summer Shubarteniz dries up turning into a sor, where the salt precipitates in numerous spots of the exposed bottom of the lake. The salt of Shubarteniz is of high quality.

== Flora ==
There is little vegetation in the area of Shubarteniz, except for scattered spots of saltwort growth near the lakeshore.

== See also ==
- Kazakh semi-desert
- List of lakes of Kazakhstan
