= Zhymyky =

River in Kazakhstan

Zhymyky Жымықы
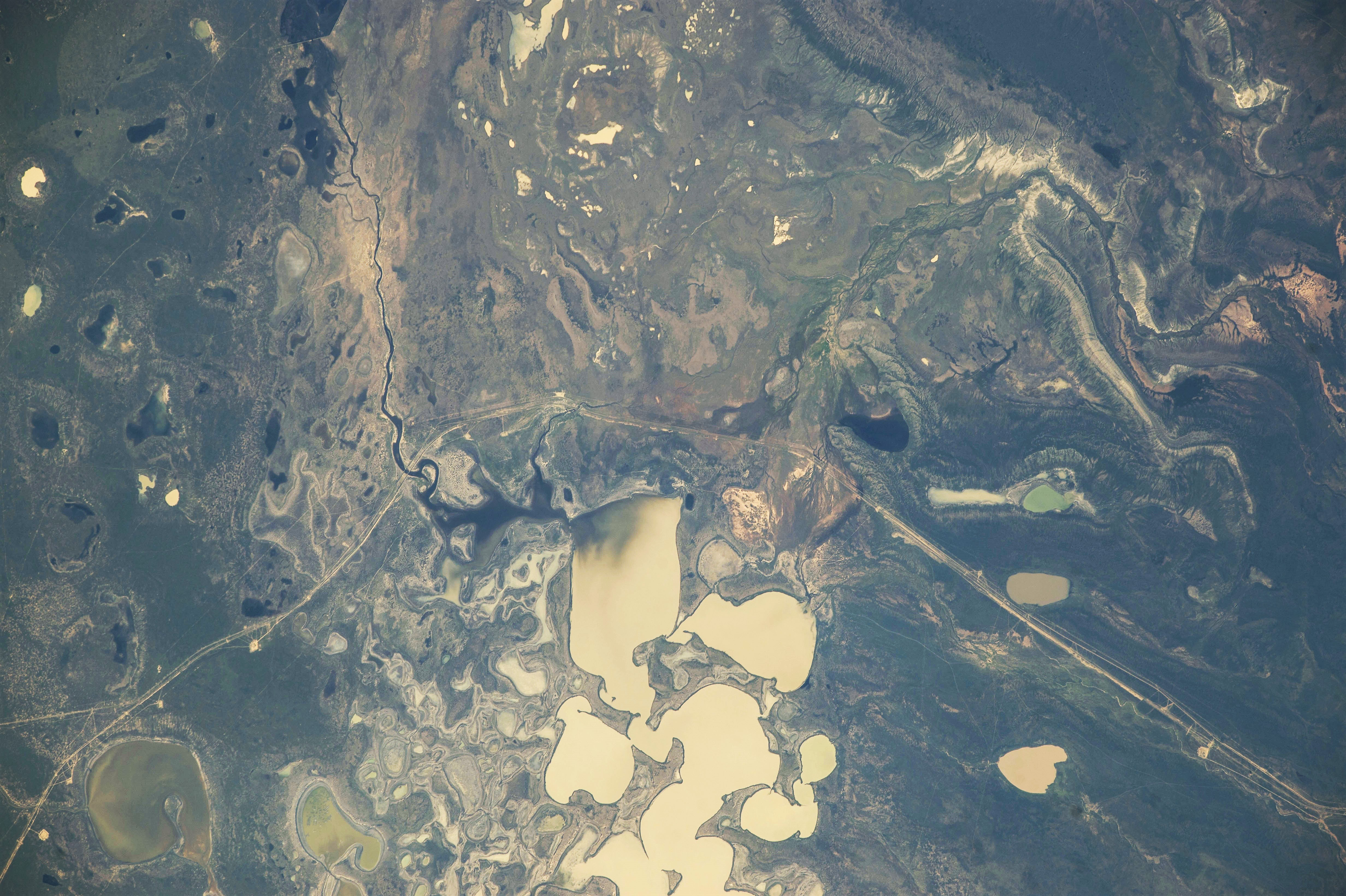
- 2016 ISS image with the Zhymyky flowing into lake Shubarteniz from the northeast

- Mouth location in Kazakhstan

Location
- Country: Kazakhstan

Physical characteristics
- Source: Ulytau
  - coordinates: 47°44′30″N 65°52′48″E
  - elevation: 449 m (1,473 ft)
- Mouth: Shubarteniz
  - coordinates: 47°44′47″N 64°55′03″E
  - elevation: 125 m (410 ft)
- Length: 105 km (65 mi)
- Basin size: 1,460 km^{2} (560 sq mi)

The Zhymyky (Kazakh: Жымықы; Russian: Жимыкы) is a river in the Ulytau District, Ulytau Region, Kazakhstan. It has a length of 105 km (65 mi) and a drainage basin of 1,460 km^{2} (560 sq mi).

The river flows across the road that runs roughly from east to west between Koskol and Karsakpay.

== Course ==
The Zhymyky has its origin in the southwestern slopes of the Ulytau Range, to the west of the Lakbay wintering settlement. It heads roughly westward and northwestward within a deep, steep channel. In its final stretch the river bends and flows roughly southwestwards, bending southwards near the end and flowing into the northeastern shores of the Shubarteniz lake.

The Zhymyky is fed by winter snows and during the yearly spring floods its water is fresh. The waters of the river are used for watering livestock.

== See also ==
- List of rivers of Kazakhstan
