= Tauysh =

Tauysh Тәуіш
- Village
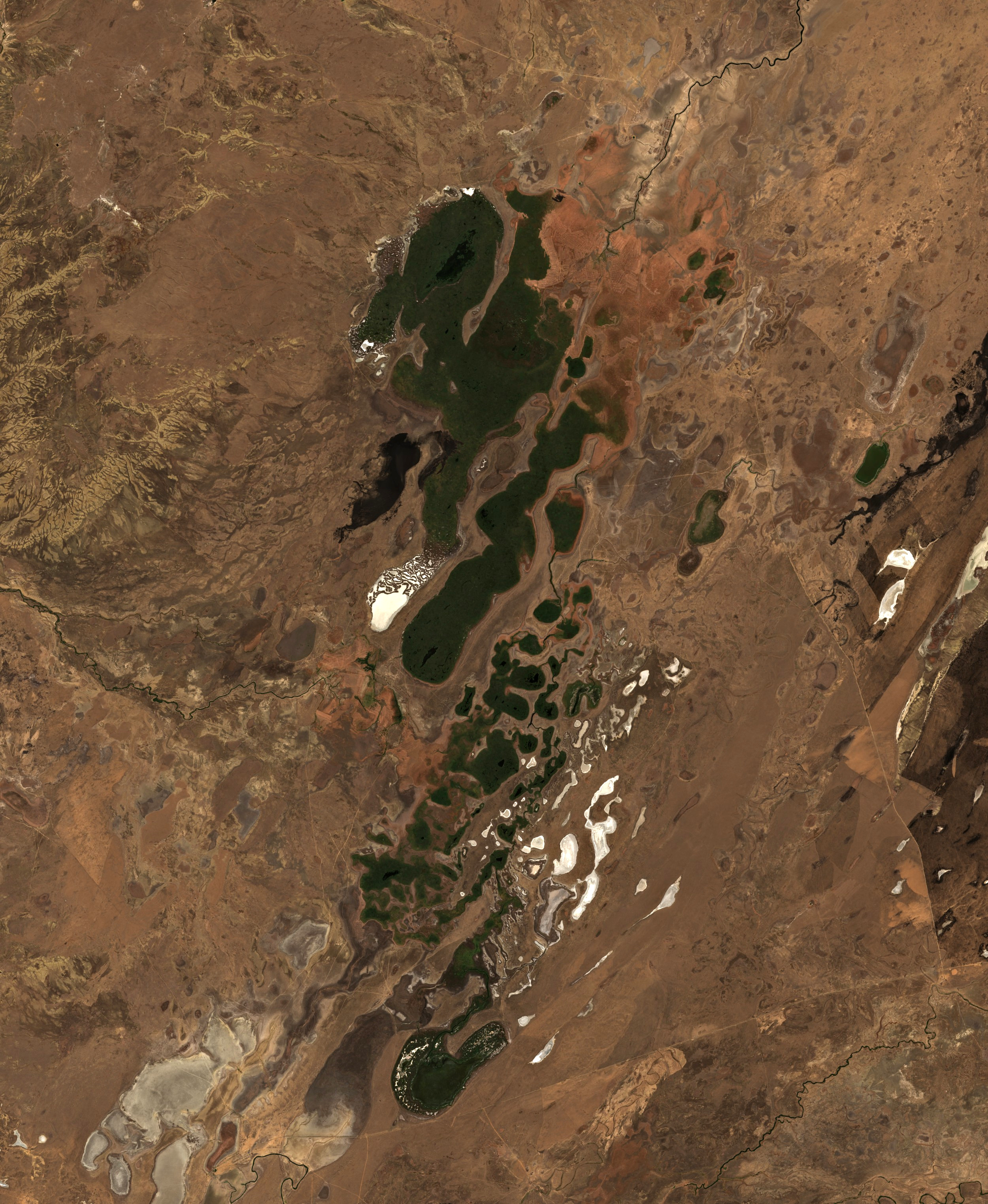
- Tauysh at the southern end of lake Sarykopa

- Location in Kazakhstan
- Coordinates: 49°59′05″N 63°56′32″E
- Country: Kazakhstan
- Region: Kostanay Region
- District: Zhangeldi District

Population (2009)
  - Total: 1,177
- Time zone: UTC+6 (East Kazakhstan Time)
- Post code: 030101

Tauysh (Kazakh: Тәуіш) is a village in Zhangeldi District, Kostanay Region, Kazakhstan. It is the administrative center of Zharkol rural district (KATO code - 394249100). Population: 1,177 (2009 census results); 1,217 (1999 census results).

== Geography ==
Tauysh is located at the southern end of lake Sarykopa. In years of significant snowfall water flows out of the lake southwards into the Turgay river through a channel close to the village, but only very rarely.
