= Nura, Kazakhstan =

Nura, Kazakhstan may refer to:

- Nura, Nura District, a district capital in Karaganda Region
- Nura, Shet District, a village in Karaganda Region
- Nura, Yrgyz District, a village in Aktobe Region
- Nura, Enbekshikazakh District, a village in Almaty Region
- Nura, Talgar District, a village in Almaty Region
- Nura, Ordabasy District, a village in Turkistan Region
