= Damdi, Kostanay Region =

Damdi Дәмді
- Village
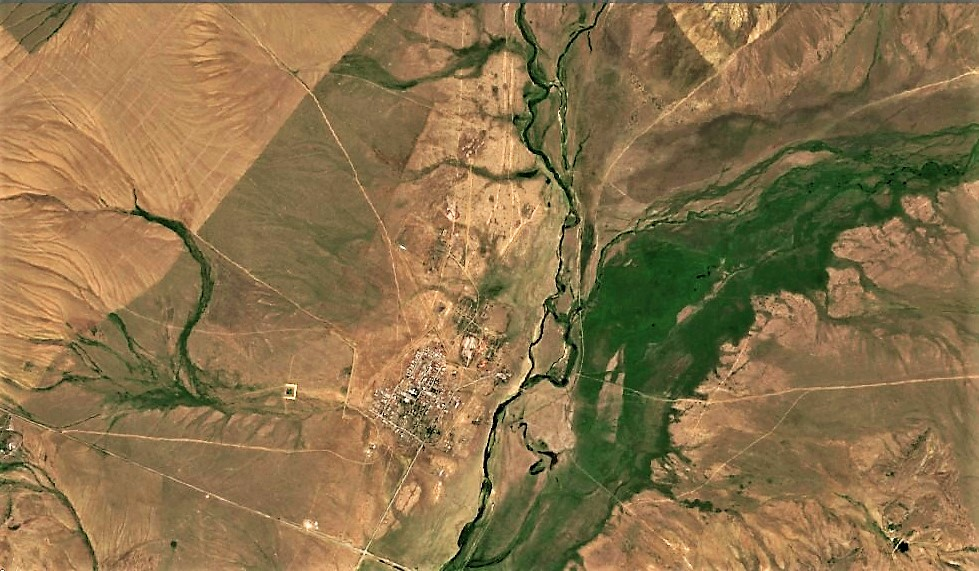

- Location in Kazakhstan
- Coordinates: 51°12′25″N 65°01′21″E
- Country: Kazakhstan
- Region: Kostanay Region
- District: Nauyrzym District
- Rural district: Damdi Rural District

Population (2009)
  - Total: 726
- Time zone: UTC+5 (Kazakhstan Time)
- Post code: 111403

Damdi (Kazakh: Дәмді; Russian: Дамды) is a village in Nauyrzym District, Kostanay Region, Kazakhstan. It is the administrative center of the Damdi Rural District (KATO code - 395837100).

Population: 990 (2009 census results); 726 (1999 census results).

== Geography ==
Damdi is located 120 kilometers (75 mi) to the southeast of Karamendy, the district capital. It rises by the banks of river Ulken Damdi, the main tributary of the Saryozen.
