= Tegene =

River in Kazakhstan

Tegene Тегене
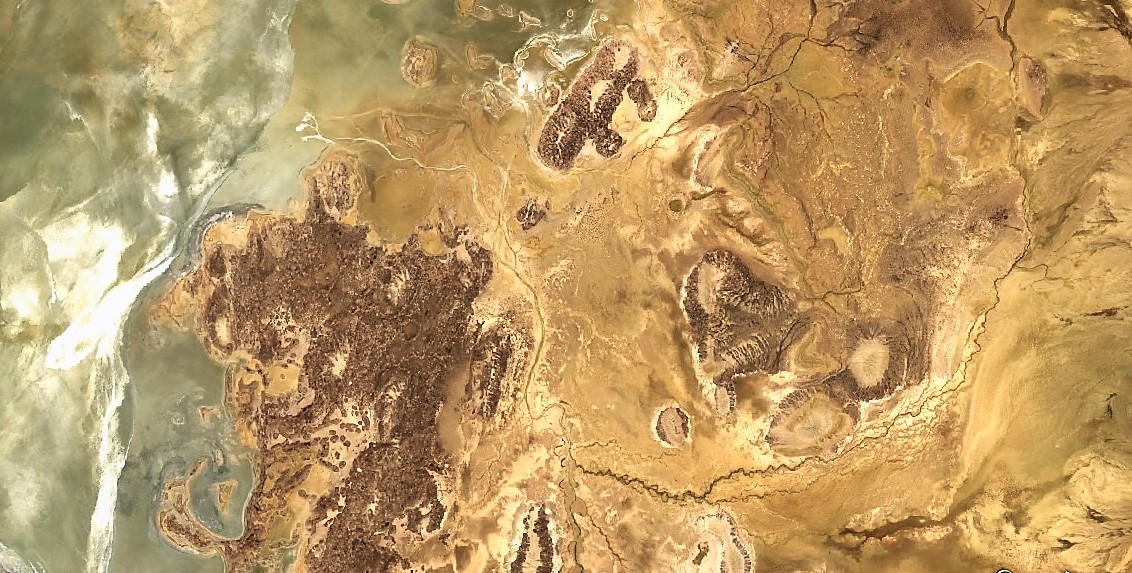
- Shalkarteniz lake and course of the Tegene river Sentinel-2 image

- Mouth location in Kazakhstan

Location
- Country: Kazakhstan

Physical characteristics
- Source: Mashay Kemer
  - coordinates: 48.101855°N 64.091569°E
  - elevation: c. 98 m (322 ft)
- Mouth: Shalkarteniz
  - coordinates: 48°17′48″N 63°24′12″E
  - elevation: c. 50 m (160 ft)
- Length: 117 km (73 mi)
- Basin size: 2,530 km^{2} (980 sq mi)
- Discharge
  - average: 0.16 m^{3}/s (5.7 cu ft/s)

The Tegene (Kazakh: Тегене; Russian: Тегене) is a river in the Aktobe Region and Ulytau Region, Kazakhstan. It has a length of 117 km (73 mi) and a drainage basin of 2,530 km^{2} (980 sq mi).

The Tegene flows wholly across uninhabited territory. Its basin is used seasonally for livestock grazing, before the burnout of the grass in the summer. The name of the river originated in the Kazakh language word for "bowl".

== Course ==
The river originates in springs located in the Mashay Kemer. In its first stretch it flows roughly westwards to the north of the Saryapankum Sands (Russian: Пески Сарыапанкум). Halfway through its course the river describes a wide bend and flows northwards, bending again to the west in its final stretch. The Tegene has its mouth in the northwestern end of the Shalkarteniz endorheic lake, to the north of the mouth of the Zhyngyldyozek.

The river is fed by the winter snows and flows only in the spring. In the summer it dries up.

== See also ==
- List of rivers of Kazakhstan
