= Zhamantuz, Zhangeldi District =

Lake in Kazakhstan

Zhamantuz
- Жамантұз
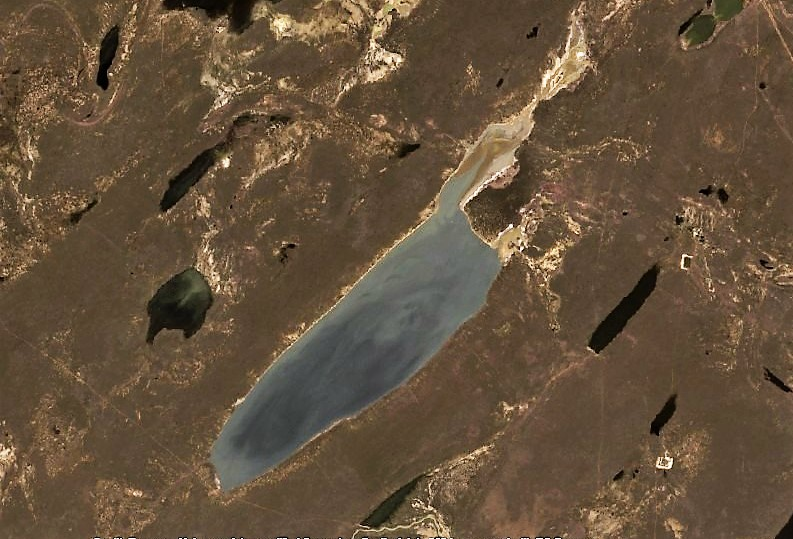
- Sentinel-2 picture of the lake

- Location within Kazakhstan
- Location: Turgay Depression
- Coordinates: 49°37′57″N 64°08′53″E
- Type: endorheic lake
- Basin countries: Kazakhstan
- Max. length: 5.2 kilometers (3.2 mi)
- Max. width: 1.2 kilometers (0.75 mi)
- Surface area: 4.8 square kilometers (1.9 sq mi)
- Residence time: UTC+6:00
- Shore length^{1}: 12.5 kilometers (7.8 mi)
- Surface elevation: 111 meters (364 ft)
- Islands: no
- ^{1} Shore length is not a well-defined measure.

Zhamantuz (Kazakh: Жамантұз) is a salt lake in the Zhangeldi District, Kostanay Region, Kazakhstan.

The lake lies 17 kilometers (11 mi) to the south of Kokalat town. The name Zhamantuz, meaning "bad salt" in the Kazakh language, is of nomadic origin.

== Geography ==
Zhamantuz is an endorheic lake of the Turgay Depression. It is part of the Turgay river basin. The lake lies at an elevation of 111 meters (364 ft). The Turgay flows about 15 kilometers (9.3 mi) to the northwest of the lake.

Zhamantuz has an elongated shape, stretching for over 5 kilometers (3.1 mi) in a northeast–southwest direction. The lake fills yearly with rain and snow and rarely freezes in the winter. Zhamantuz is an intermittent lake that dries in the summer.

== Flora and fauna ==
Zhamantuz is known as a "dead lake" (Kazakh: тұйық көл) in Kazakh owing to the lack of fish living in its bitter waters. Typha and Phragmites reeds grow in stretches of the lakeshore and wormwood tufts close around the basin.

== See also ==
- List of lakes of Kazakhstan
