= Kalmakkyrgan =

River in Kazakhstan

Kalmakkyrgan Қалмаққырылған
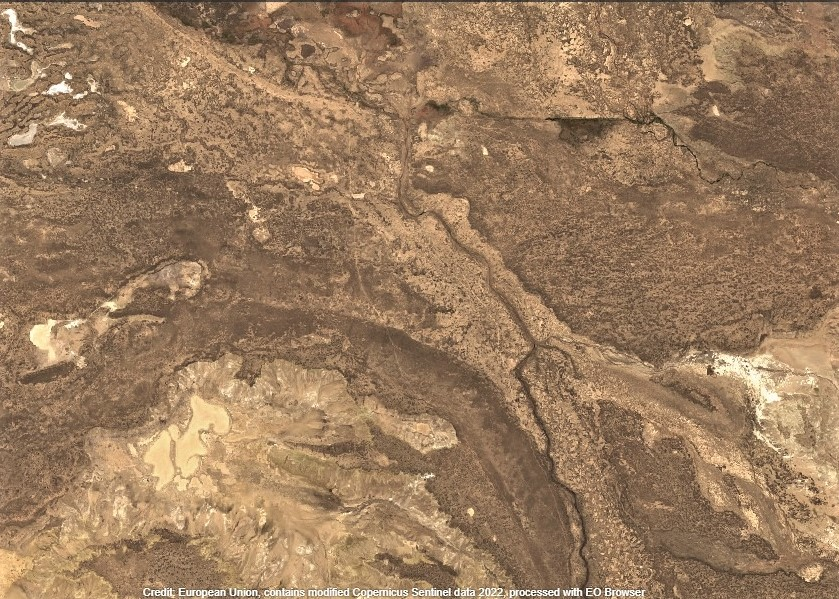
- Final stretch of the Kalmakkyrgan Sentinel-2 image with the river flowing in a NNW direction

- Mouth location in Kazakhstan

Location
- Country: Kazakhstan

Physical characteristics
- Source: Mt Karamola, Ulytau
  - coordinates: 47°52′44″N 66°36′05″E
- Mouth: Shubarteniz
  - coordinates: 47°26′3″N 64°56′08″E
- Length: 325 km (202 mi)
- Basin size: 10,100 km^{2} (3,900 sq mi)
- Discharge
  - average: 1.05 m^{3}/s (37 cu ft/s)

The Kalmakkyrgan, also known as Bileuty (Kazakh: Белеуітті or Білеу; Russian: Билеуты), is a river in the Ulytau District, Ulytau Region, Kazakhstan. It has a length of 325 km (202 mi) and a drainage basin of 10,100 km^{2} (3,900 sq mi).

The river flows across a desert and semi-desert area without permanent settlements. In the early summer there are temporary camps of shepherds near the Kalmakkyrgan consisting of one or more yurts. The water of the river is brackish, but suitable for livestock drinking purposes.

== Etymology ==
The name of the river originated in the Kazakh language word for "the place where the Kalmyks were killed", referring to an event of the Kazakh–Dzungar Wars that took place in 1730 by the river banks. Formerly the river was known as Bileuty, a name that is still used to refer to a stretch of its upper course.

== Course ==
The river has its sources near the southern slopes of Karamola mountain, southeastern Ulytau Range. In its first stretch it heads roughly southwards as the Bileuty. Further down its course the river describes a wide bend and flows roughly southwestwards and then westwards to the south of the Baikonyr through a wide valley. In its final stretch it bends again to flow northwestwards and nearly northwards. The river has its mouth in the southern end of the Shubarteniz lake, but its waters mostly get lost in the sands before reaching it.

The river is fed by the winter snows and is frozen between November and March. Following the thaw it flows until May, when it breaks up into ponds. In the summer it dries up. The banks of the river are steep for long distances, the heights of the cliffs are usually between 3 m (9.8 ft) to 10 m (33 ft). Its main tributaries are the Keregetassay, Amanzholsay, Duysembay, Sholaksay, Zhide and Bozingen from the right, as well as the Karsakpai, Talsay, Karatobesay, Ashylysay and Akkiiksay from the left.

== See also ==
- List of rivers of Kazakhstan
