= Karsakpay inscription =

Inscription written in Old Uyghur script

The Karsakpay inscription at the Hermitage Museum

The Karsakpay inscription (also called the Timur's stone) is a message carved on April 28, 1391 into a fragment of rock in Ulu Tagh mountainside near the Karsakpay mines, Kazakhstan. It was found in 1935. It consists of three lines in Arabic, and eight lines in Chagatai, written in the Old Uyghur alphabet.

After its discovery, the Karsakpay inscription was taken to the Hermitage Museum in Leningrad (now Saint Petersburg) in 1936, where it is today. The inscription mentions how Timur is asking to those reading the inscription to remember him with a prayer.

The inscription was researched and published by Nicholas Poppe in 1940, and later researched by Napil Bazilhan, Hasan Eren, Olga Borisovna Frolova, A. P. Grigoryev, N.N. Telitsyn, A.N. Ponomarev and Zeki Velidi Togan.

== Measurements ==
The inscription measures 80x40 centimeters. The depth of the carvings are within 1.5–2 millimeters. The distance between Arabic and Chagatai lines are 18 centimeters.

== Description ==
The inscription notes the crossing of Timur, a Turco-Mongol conqueror, and his 200,000 men in pursuit of campaign against Tokhtamysh, a ruler of the Golden Horde from 1378 to 1395, and the route that passed through the semi-desert regions of Betpak-Dala.

In Zafarnama (Book of Victories), written in the first quarter of the 15th century, its author Sharaf ad-Din Ali Yazdi gives one historical event of that campaign:

For a joyful survey of that steppe, Timur ascended to the top of the mountain, the whole plain was all green. He stayed there that day, (then) a high order came out, so that the soldiers brought stones and a high sign, like a lighthouse was put in that place. Master stonecutters inscribed on it the date of that day, so that to leave the reminder on the face of time.

== Complete text ==
=== Arabic ===
Arabic transliteration: (by the International Turkic Academy)

Bismillaahirrahmanirrahim
Malikul mulikl kuddusul hakkul muminul muhayminul zabbarul
kadirul hakimul mumitul hayiu

Translation:

In the name of Allah, the gracious, the merciful
Lord of Existence, Sanctuary of Truth, Vigilant Protector, Almighty and All-Powerful
Wise Giver of Life and Death

=== Chagatai ===
Chagatai transliteration:

Tariq yettı yuz yıl toqsan üçintä qoy yaznıŋ ara ay
Turannıŋ sultānı Timurbäg üç yuz miŋ çärig bilä
Islām üçün Toqtamışqan bulğar qanıqa yurıdı
Bu yergä yetip bälgü bolzun tep bu obanı qopardı
Täŋri nısbat bergäy inşalla
Täŋri ul kişikä rahmat qılğay bizni duā bıla yād qılğay

Translation:

Summer seven hundred and ninety-three, in the middle spring month of the year of the sheep
Sultan of Turan Timur-Bey went up with three hundred thousand troops
for Islam on the Bulgarian Khan Toktamysh Khan.
Reaching the area, he built this mound to have been a memorial.
God willing, the Lord would execute justice!
The Lord will have mercy to the people of the country! Yes, they will remember us with prayer!

Chagatai transliteration: (by International Turkic Academy)

Tarıh /Qara ?/ yetı yüz toksan üçinte /Toqmaq orna-da ?/ qoy yıl yaznıŋ ara ay
Turannıŋ sultanı Temür bek iki (üč ?) yüz mıŋ čerik bile
Ismi üčün Toqtamıš qan bulğar qanığa yorıdı
Bu yerge yetip belgü bolsun tep bu obanı qopardı
Teŋrı nisfat bergeı insi-alla
Teŋrı el kisige rahmat qılğay bız-nı duwa bıle yad qılğay
