= Ulken Koskopa =

Lake in Kazakhstan

- Үлкен Қосқопа
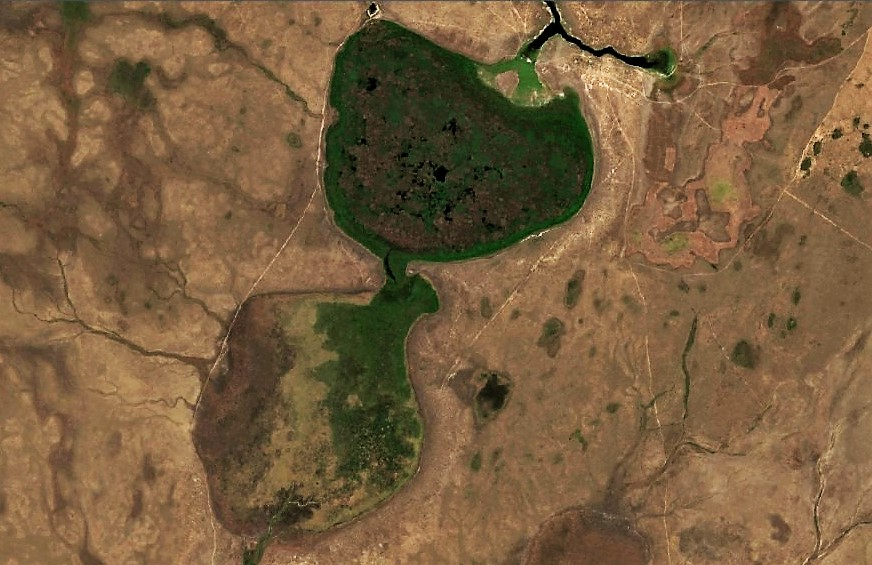
- Sentinel-2 picture of the twin lakes with Ulken Koskopa above

- Location within Kazakhstan
- Location: Turgay Depression
- Coordinates: 50°44′02″N 64°34′01″E
- Type: exorheic lake
- Primary inflows: Karasu
- Basin countries: Kazakhstan
- Max. length: 3.8 kilometers (2.4 mi)
- Max. width: 2.6 kilometers (1.6 mi)
- Surface area: 6.2 square kilometers (2.4 sq mi)
- Residence time: UTC+5:00
- Surface elevation: 111 meters (364 ft)
- Islands: no

Ulken Koskopa (Kazakh: Үлкен Қосқопа; Russian: Большая Коскопа) is a salt lake in Nauyrzym District, Kostanay Region, Kazakhstan.

The lake is located 22 kilometers (14 mi) to the southwest of Mereke. Now abandoned Karasu village was located by the northern shore. The area is quite desolate, with few settlements.

The name Koskopa in the Kazakh language means "Double Kopa" —"Kopa" referring to a lake that seasonally becomes a salt marsh overgrown with reeds and sedges.

== Geography ==
Ulken Koskopa is an endorheic lake of the Turgay Depression and is part of the Sarykopa lake basin. River Saryozen flows 5 kilometers (3.1 mi) to the southeast. The lake lies at an elevation of 111 meters (364 ft). Small river Karasu flows in from the north and twin lake Kishi Koskopa is very close to the south, both lakes being joined by a short 250 meters (820 ft) wide sound.

Ulken Koskopa has roughly a kidney shape, stretching for almost 4 kilometers (2.5 mi) in an east–west direction. Its southern neighbor is round, and about as large. Lake Kiikkol lies 33 kilometers (21 mi) to the north, and Sarykopa 33 kilometers (21 mi) to the southwest. The Koskopa lakes freeze at the end of November and thaw by the end of March. Both lakes usually dry in the summer, becoming salt marshes.

== Flora and fauna ==
Typha and Phragmites reeds grow in Ulken Koskopa. The lake basin is surrounded by steppe vegetation.

== See also ==
- List of lakes of Kazakhstan
