= Mereke =

Mereke Мереке
- Village
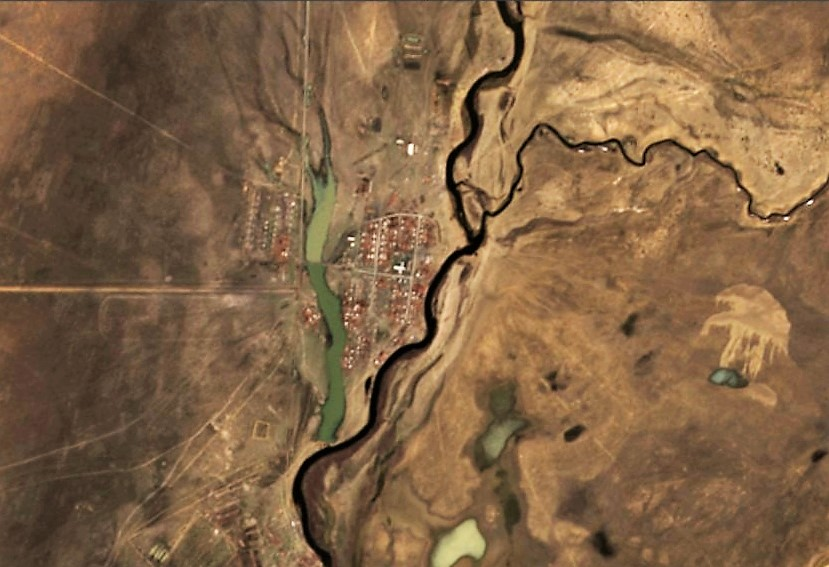

- Location in Kazakhstan
- Coordinates: 50°52′17″N 64°49′27″E
- Country: Kazakhstan
- Region: Kostanay Region
- District: Nauyrzym District
- Rural district: Damdi Rural District

Population (2009)
  - Total: 448
- Time zone: UTC+6 (East Kazakhstan Time)
- Post code: 111404

Mereke (Kazakh: Мереке; Russian: Мереке), until 1993 known as Komsomolsky, is a village in Nauyrzym District, Kostanay Region, Kazakhstan. It is part of the Damdi Rural District (KATO code - 395845100).

Population: 448 (2009 census results); 963 (1999 census results). Until 2013 Mereke was the administrative center of the now abolished Mereke Rural District.

== Geography ==
Mereke is located 97 kilometers (60 mi) to the southeast of Karamendy, the district capital. It rises by the banks of river Ulken Damdi, the main tributary of the Saryozen. Now abandoned Karasu village was located 22 kilometers (14 mi) to the southwest, by lake Ulken Koskopa.
