= Ulytau (range) =

Mountain range in Kazakhstan

- Ұлытау
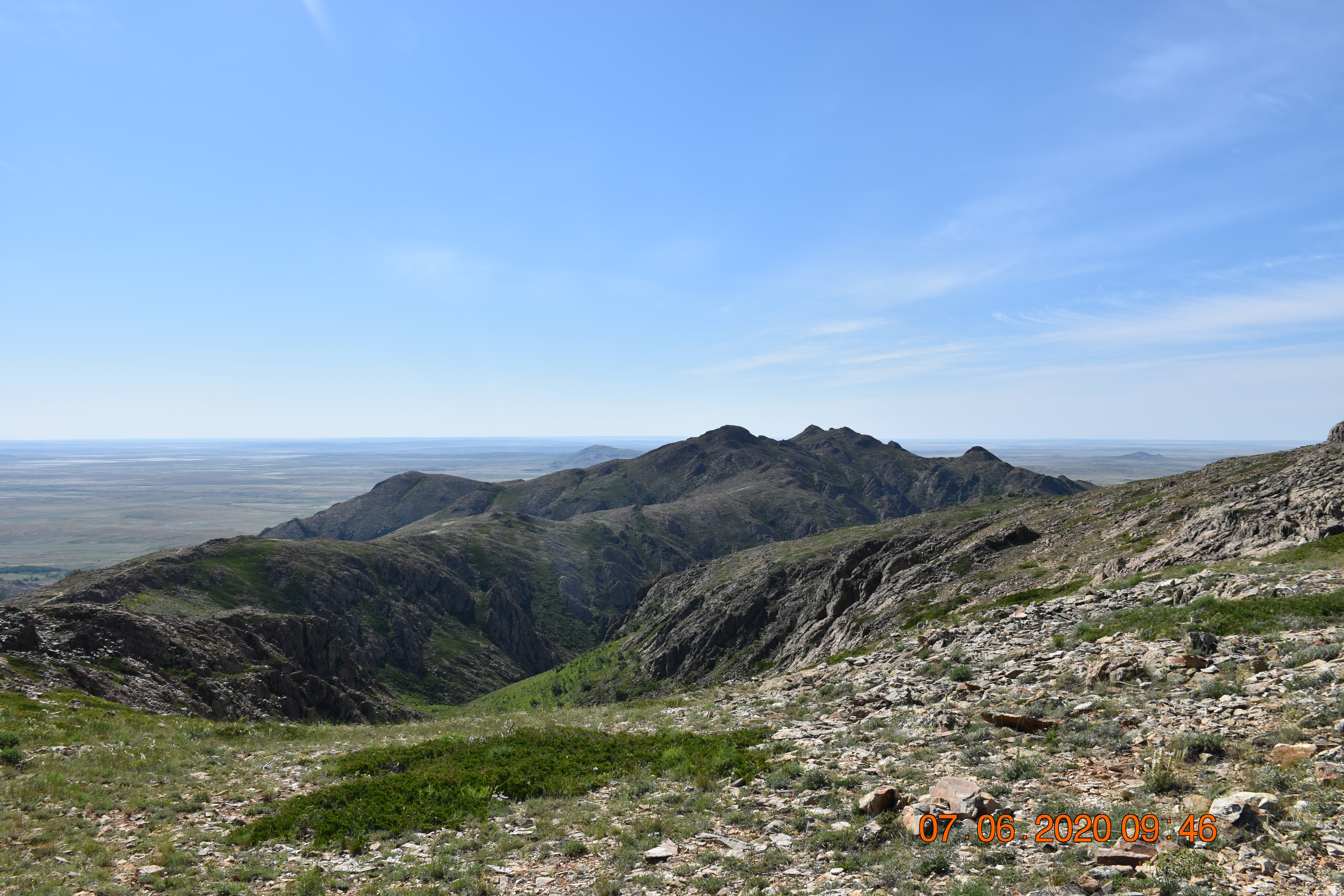
- Landscape of the range

Highest point
- Peak: Akmeshit
- Elevation: 1,131 m (3,711 ft)
- Coordinates: 48°38′39″N 66°56′46″E

Dimensions
- Length: 200 km (120 mi) N / S
- Width: 35 km (22 mi) NE/ SW

Geography
- Location within Kazakhstan
- Location: Kazakhstan
- Range coordinates: 48°56′N 67°0′E
- Parent range: Kazakh Uplands

Geology
- Orogeny: Alpine orogeny
- Rock type: Granite

Ulytau or Ulutau (Kazakh: Ұлытау; Russian: Улытау) is a range of mountains in Kazakhstan. Administratively the range is part of the Ulytau District, Ulytau Region.

== Geography ==
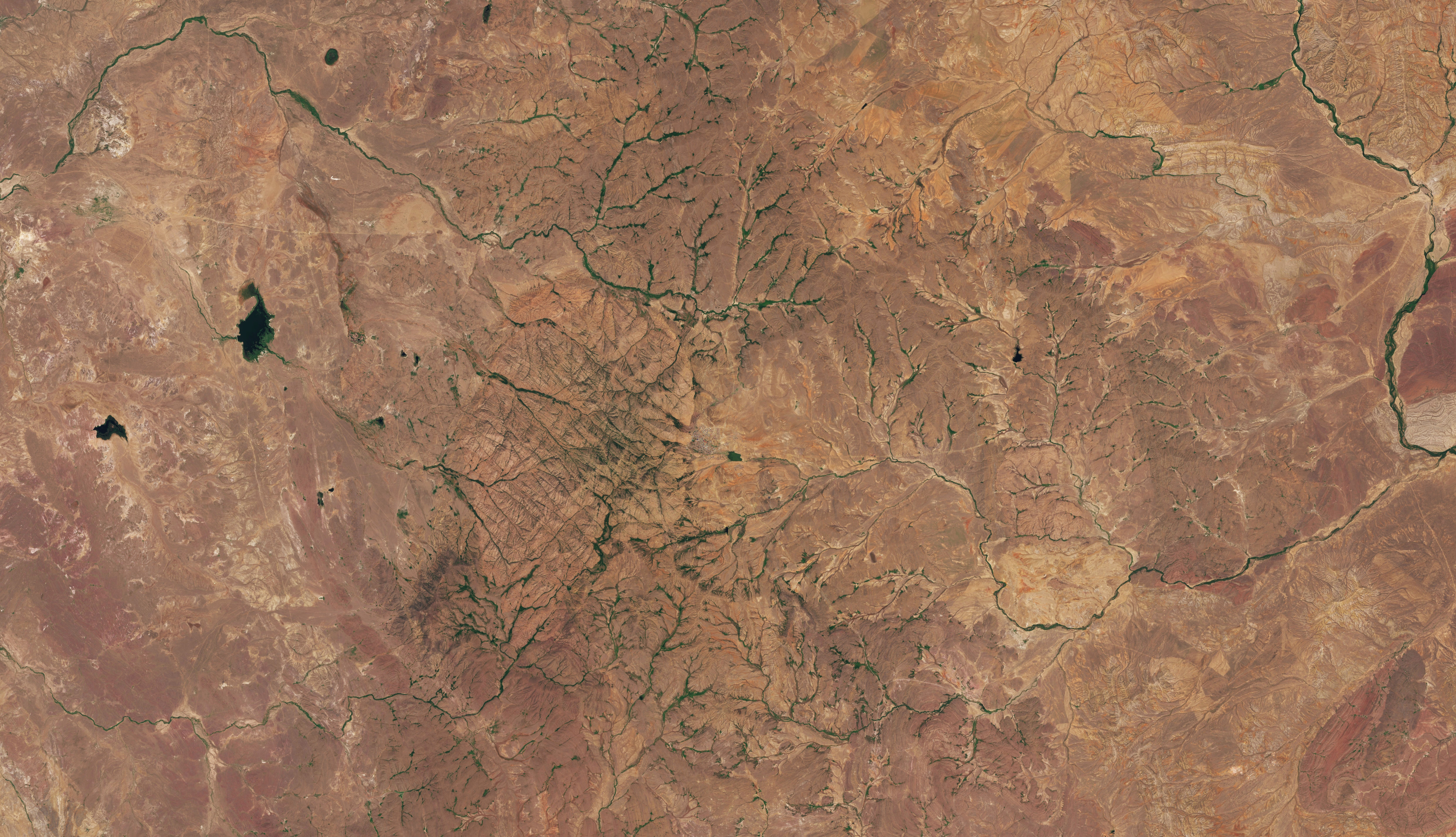
A satellite image of the range (Sentinel-2 L1C data, modified)

The Ulutau is one of the subranges of the Kazakh Upland system. The range stretches from north to south for about 200 kilometers (120 mi). Its highest point is 1,131 meters (3,711 ft) high Akmeshit. The mountains are rocky, deeply dissected by ravines and have an arid look.

Rivers Uly-Zhylanshyk, Terisaqqan, Zhymyky, Baikonyr, Kalmakkyrgan (Bileuty) and Karakengir have their sources in the range.

== Flora ==
Steppe vegetation, including grasses, Artemisia and Ephedra grows in rock crevices. Shrubs are found on scree slopes.

== See also ==
- Geography of Kazakhstan
