= Ulkayak =

River in Kazakhstan

Ulkayak Өлкейек / Улькаяк
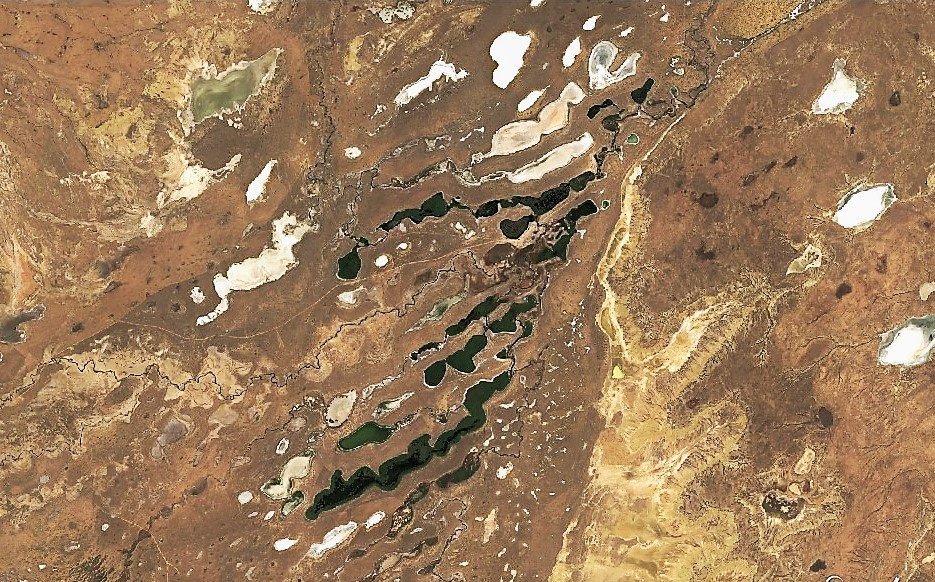
- Sentinel-2 image with the lower Ulkayak and lake Kyzylkol in the upper left

- Mouth location in Kazakhstan

Location
- Countries: Kazakhstan

Physical characteristics
- Source: Confluence of Zhantai and Tolybai rivers
  - coordinates: 50°31′18″N 62°18′56″E
- Mouth: Kyzylkol
  - coordinates: 48°54′41″N 62°00′26″E
  - elevation: 77 metres (253 ft)
- Length: 349 km (217 mi)
- Basin size: 13,300 km^{2} (5,100 sq mi)
- Discharge
  - average: 1.6 m^{3}/s (57 cu ft/s)

Basin features
- Progression: Kyzylkol → Ayrkol → Turgay

The Ulkayak (Kazakh: Өлкейек; Russian: Улькаяк) is a river in Kazakhstan. It has a length of 349 kilometres (217 mi) and a catchment area of 13,300 square kilometres (5,100 sq mi).

It is one of the rivers of the southern part of the Turgay Depression, belonging to the Irgyz -Turgay ecoregion. It flows across the Zhangeldi District of the Kostanay Region, Kazakhstan. There are historical Kazakh sites in the valley of the Ulkayak.

== Course ==
The Ulkayak is formed at the confluence of rivers Zhantai (Жантай) and Tolybai (Толыбай). The river flows first southwestwards across steppe territory within a flat valley. It cuts across some gorges along its course, the longest of which is 9.8 km (6.1 mi). Towards its last stretch its valley widens and the river meanders heading roughly southwards. Finally it flows into the Kyzylkol, a salt lake which is connected with the Turgay through a system of lakes linked by channels. The water of the river is fresh, but it turns brackish in the summer, when the river dries in stretches and its flow almost stops.

=== Tributaries ===
The 144 km (89 mi) long Kabyrga and the 48 km (30 mi) long Karabutak are the main tributaries of the Ulkayak. The river freezes yearly between early November and late March. Its main food is snow.

== See also ==
- List of rivers of Kazakhstan
- Lakes of the lower Turgay and Irgiz
