= Shalkarteniz =

Lake in the country of Kazakhstan

- Шалқартеңіз / Шалкартениз
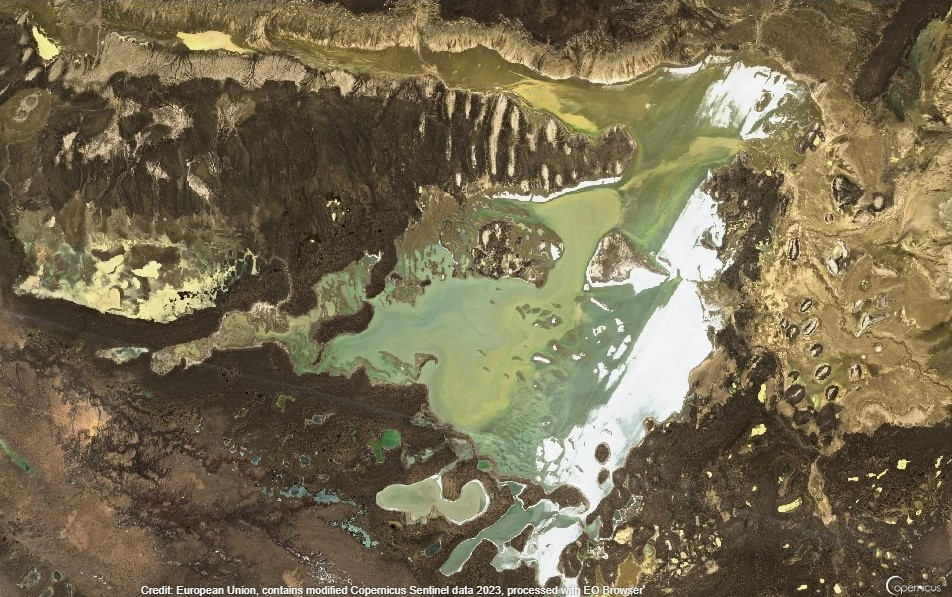
- Sentinel-2 image of the lake in April 2018.

- Location within Kazakhstan
- Location: Turgay Basin
- Coordinates: 48°10′N 63°10′E
- Type: endorheic
- Primary inflows: Turgay; Zhyngyldyozek; Tegene
- Basin countries: Kazakhstan
- Max. length: 60 kilometers (37 mi)
- Max. width: 30 kilometers (19 mi)
- Surface area: 1,800 square kilometers (690 sq mi)
- Max. depth: 3 meters (9.8 ft)
- Surface elevation: 55 meters (180 ft)

Shalkarteniz (Kazakh: Шалқартеңіз; Russian: Шалкартениз) is a salt lake in the Yrgyz District, Aktobe Region, Kazakhstan.

Shalkarteniz lies in the northeastern sector of the Turan Depression, 160 kilometers (99 mi) northwest of the city of Aralsk. It is part of the Kazakh semi-desert ecoregion. There are no towns in the immediate vicinity. The nearest settlement is Zhaisanbai village, located 23 kilometers (14 mi) to the west.

== History ==
Until the end of the 16th century, the Shalkarteniz basin was regularly filled by the formerly more abundant waters of the Turgay river, which at that time reached the Aral Sea. In the centuries that followed the river became shallow and carried less water, so the Shalkarteniz could not overflow. Thus the Turgay stopped flowing south and the depression lost its connection with the Aral Sea. By the 20th century, at the time of the Kazakh SSR, the degradation of the forest cover and extraction of water from the Turgay and Irgiz rivers increased. Finally by 1960 Shalkarteniz completely dried up and the greater flamingo colonies stopped nesting in the place.

However, the snowy winter of 1969-1970 filled again the rivers of the Turgay Basin, causing early and exceptionally heavy floods. Such unusual floods happened again in 1971 and 1972. As a result, the lake basin filled seasonally and the flamingos returned, establishing summer nesting colonies as before.

== Geography ==
Shalkarteniz is an extensive seasonal lake. It is located in an endorheic basin at the bottom of a plain at the southern limit of the Turgay Basin, north of the Turan Depression and 200 kilometers (120 mi) northeast of the Aral Sea. Arid areas surround the Shalkarteniz and to the south stretches the sandy desert of the Aral Karakum.

The lake is fed by snow. The waters of the Zhyngyldyozek, Tegene, Turgay and Irgiz rivers fill the dry basin when the snow melts in the spring, turning it into a bittern salty lake. The seasonal lake lasts around three months with an average depth between 2 meters (6 ft 7 in) and 3 meters (9.8 ft). In the summer it is usually a dry salt flat or partly swampy. Lakes Karakol and Kurdym lie close to the south of Shalkarteniz. Lake Akkol lies about 50 kilometers (31 mi) to the NNE of the Shalkarteniz northern end.

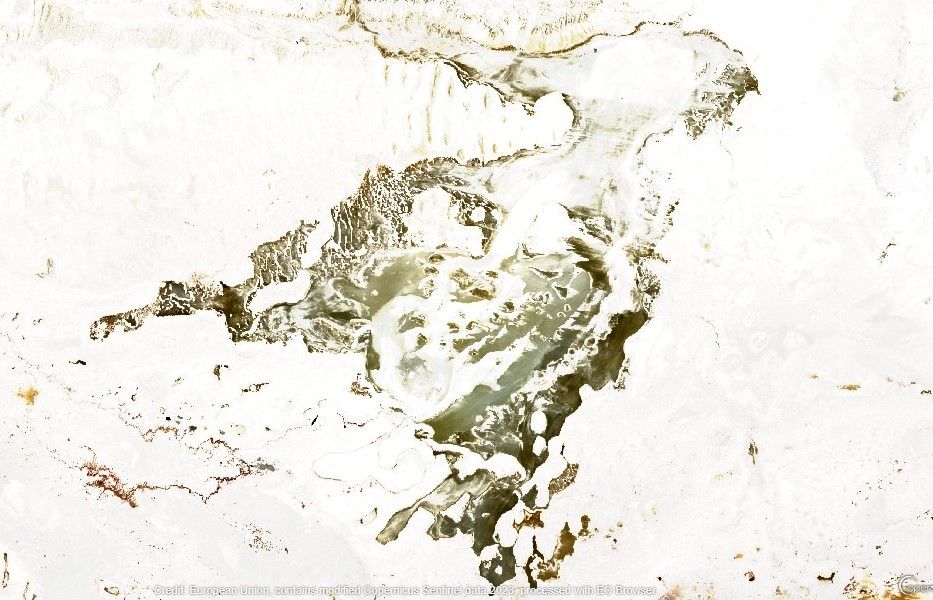
Sentinel-2 image of the lake under snow.

== See also ==
- Sor (geomorphology)
- List of lakes of Kazakhstan
