= Koskol =

Koskol Қоскөл
- Village
- Location in Kazakhstan
- Coordinates: 47°34′58″N 64°33′21″E
- Country: Kazakhstan
- Region: Ulytau Region
- District: Ulytau District
- Rural District: Koskol Rural District
- Elevation: 400 ft (122 m)

Population (2009)
  - Total: 412
- Time zone: UTC+05:00 (Kazakhstan Time)
- Post code: 101511

Koskol (Kazakh: Қоскөл; Russian: Косколь), is a village in the Ulytau District, Ulytau Region, Kazakhstan. It is the head of the Koskol Rural District (КАТО code — 356055100). Population: 412 (2009 census results); 601 (1999 census results).

== Geography ==
The village is located 4 km (2.5 mi) to the west of the western shore of Shubarteniz, close to the outflowing point of the Zhyngyldyozek river. A road skirting the northern end of the lake links Koskol with Karsakpay to the east.

== See also ==
- Turan Depression
