= Irgiz (Turgay) =

Irgiz Ыргыз / Иргиз
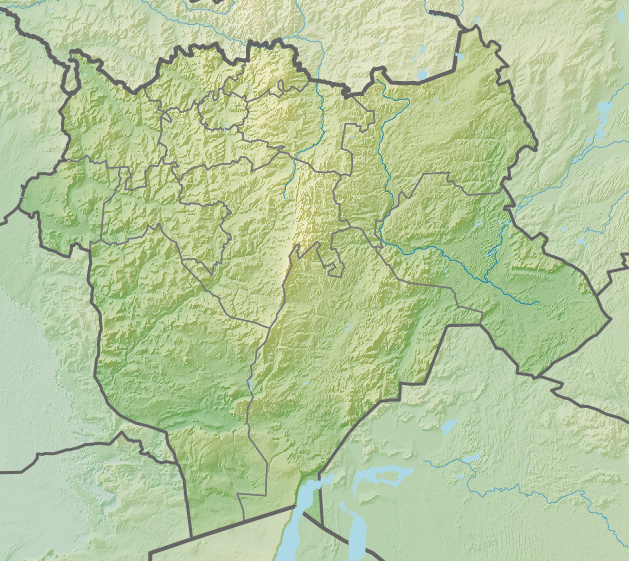

- Mouth location in Kazakhstan

Location
- Country: Kazakhstan

Physical characteristics
- Source: Mugodzhar Hills
  - elevation: 328 m (1,076 ft)
- Mouth: Turgay
  - coordinates: 48.2579°N 62.0222°E
- Length: 593 km (368 mi)
- Basin size: 31,600 km^{2} (12,200 sq mi)

Basin features
- Progression: Turgay → Shalkarteniz

The Irgiz (Kazakh: Ыргыз Yrgyz; Russian: Иргиз) is a river in Aktobe and Kostanay regions of Kazakhstan, a right tributary of the Turgay. It is 593 kilometres (368 mi) long, and has a drainage basin of 31,600 square kilometres (12,200 sq mi). It was the site of the Irghiz River skirmish in the early 13th century.

== Course ==
The Irgiz rises on the eastern slopes of the Mugodzhar Hills in the Aktobe region of Kazakhstan. It flows in a predominantly southerly direction to its confluence with the Turgay. Its main tributary is the 178 km (111 mi) long Chet-Irgiz (Шет-Иргиз) from the right.

== See also ==
- List of rivers of Kazakhstan
- Lakes of the lower Turgay and Irgiz
