= Lakes of the lower Turgay and Irgiz =

Protected lakes in Kazakhstan

- Озёра в низовьях рек Иргиз и Тургай
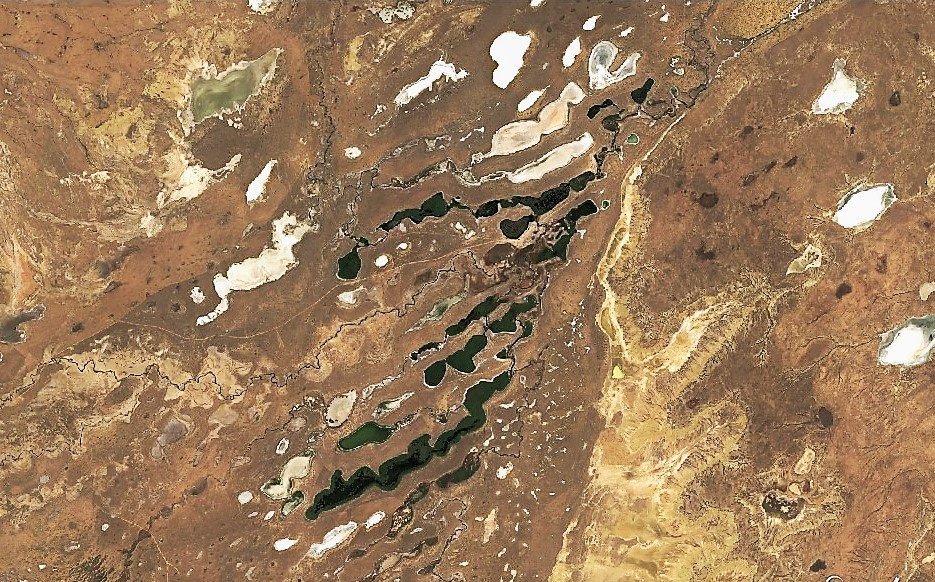
- Lakes of the lower Turgay and Irgiz Sentinel-2 satellite picture

- Location within Kazakhstan
- Interactive map of Lakes of the lower Turgay and Irgiz
- Type: Inland wetlands
- Location: Aktobe Region, Kazakhstan
- Nearest city: Nura
- Coordinates: 48°42′N 62°11′E
- Area: 348,000 ha (3,480 km^{2})
- Created: 1976
- Operator: Main Department of Zapovedniks and Game Management - Republic of Kazakhstan
- Status: Nature reserve

Ramsar Wetland
- Official name: Lakes of the lower Turgay and Irgiz
- Designated: 11 October 1976
- Reference no.: 108

Lakes of the lower Turgay and Irgiz (Russian: Озёра в низовьях рек Иргиз и Тургай) is a protected area in the Turgay Depression, Kazakhstan. Administratively it is located in the Yrgyz District of the Aktobe Region.

== Description ==
The Lakes of the lower Turgay and Irgiz protected area covers 348,000 ha (860,000 acres) of the southern sector of the Turgay Depression. It lies in the basins of rivers Turgay, its tributary Irgyz, and the Ulkayak, whose riverbeds usually dry up in summer. The area includes a number of lakes of different origins, many of which are salty. The lakes are roughly aligned in a SW / NE direction, such as the Kyzylkol, Ayrkol, Baitakkol, Kogakol, Zharkol, Zharmakol, Zharkamys, Keltekol, Shuzhyk, Karmakkol, Kogakol, Karpykkol, Maikol, Aidarkol and Aikol. The Saryozek river flows from lake Bokenkol.

In 1976 it was recognized as a Ramsar site. The area is part of the Kazakh semi-desert ecoregion.

== Ecology ==
The Irgiz-Turgay Lakes is an Important Bird Area. The landscape surrounding the lakes is mostly semi-desert. More than 100 different waterbird species, have been recorded, with up to 250,000 individuals in the area at one time. Between two and three million birds fly over the lakes in spring and autumn.

== See also ==
- List of lakes of Kazakhstan
- List of Ramsar Wetlands of International Importance
