= Sarykopa =

Lake in the country of Kazakhstan

- Сарықопа / Сарыкопа
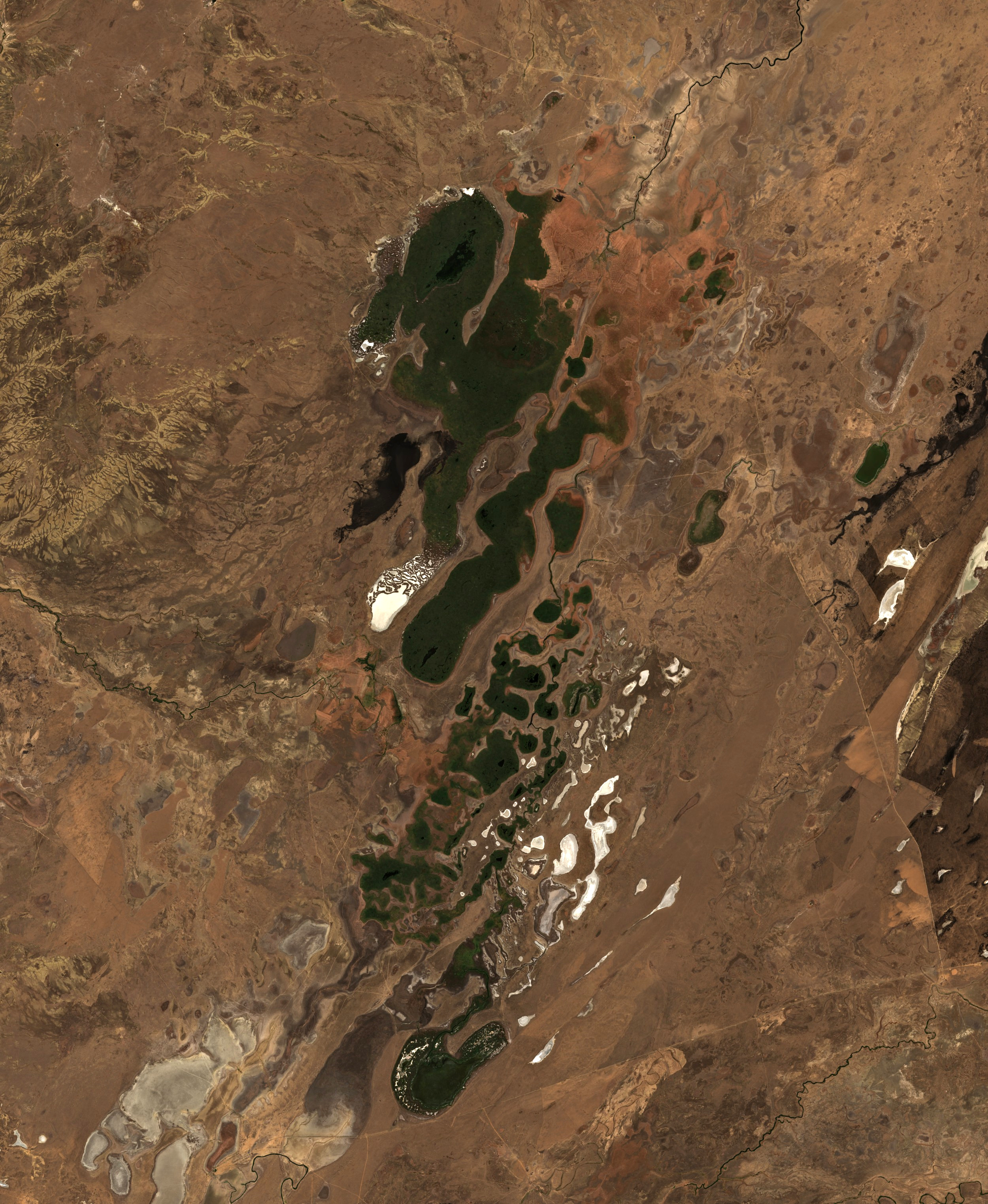
- Sentinel-2 image of the lake in 2021.

- Location within Kazakhstan
- Location: Turgay Basin
- Coordinates: 50°16′N 64°08′E
- Type: endorheic
- Primary inflows: Saryozen and Teke
- Catchment area: 985 square kilometers (380 sq mi)
- Basin countries: Kazakhstan
- Max. length: 26.7 kilometers (16.6 mi) to 53 kilometers (33 mi)
- Max. width: 13.2 kilometers (8.2 mi) to 19 kilometers (12 mi)
- Surface area: 184 square kilometers (71 sq mi) to 336 square kilometers (130 sq mi)
- Max. depth: 3.5 meters (11 ft)
- Surface elevation: 101.2 meters (332 ft)

Sarykopa (Kazakh: Сарықопа; Russian: Сарыкопа) is a bittern salt lake in the Kostanay Region, Kazakhstan.

Sarykopa lies in the steppe of the central sector of the Turgay Basin in Zhangeldi District, in the southern area of there Kostanay Region. There are a number of villages situated near the lake.

== Geography ==
Sarykopa is an endorheic lake. Its shape is elongated, stretching roughly from SSW to NNE. The 164 kilometers (102 mi) long Saryozen river flows into the lake from the north and the Teke from the west. Since the lake is fed by snow its level is subject to variations according to the inflow, reaching a maximum area of 336 square kilometers (130 sq mi) in the spring floods when the snow melts. In years of significant snowfall the lake becomes a single body of water and its waters may flow out into the Turgay river through a channel close to Tauysh village in the south, but such periods are very few and far between.

Usually the surface of the lake stays around 184 square kilometers (71 sq mi) in the more common periods of low water where Sarykopa, especially in the summer, breaks up into a cluster of separate, disconnected lakes. The depth fluctuates between 1 meter (3 ft 3 in) and 3 meters (9.8 ft). The western banks are gently sloping, while the eastern shore rises steeply up to between 5 meters (16 ft) to 10 meters (33 ft) cliff-like banks. Lakes Ulken Koskopa and Kishi Koskopa lie 33 kilometers (21 mi) to the northeast of the northern end.

== Fauna ==
Sarykopa is a refuge for birds such as the white-tailed lapwing, steppe gull, slender-billed curlew and the great white pelican, as well as the critically endangered siberian crane, but the effects of human activity on the lake are unfavorable for wildlife.

== See also ==
- List of lakes of Kazakhstan
