= Noora =

Noora may refer to:

- Noora (film), a 2002 film directed by Mahmoud Shoolizadeh
- Noora (given name), a female given name
- Noora (vaccine), an Iranian COVID-19 vaccine candidate
- House of Noora, a family in Pakistan

== See also ==
- Noor (name), a common Arabic unisex name
- Noura
