= Yrgyz =

- Town
- Location in Kazakhstan
- Coordinates: 48°37′11″N 61°15′39″E
- Country: Kazakhstan
- Region: Aktobe Region
- Time zone: UTC+05:00 (Kazakhstan Time)

Yrgyz (Kazakh: Ырғыз, Yrğyz) is a selo in Aktobe Region, Kazakhstan. It is located by the Irgiz River. Yrgyz serves as the administrative center of Yrgyz District. Population: 5,410 (2009 census results);5,329 (1999 census results).

== Climate ==
Yrgyz has a cold semi-arid climate (BSk) according to the Köppen climate classification.

Climate data for Yrgyz (1991–2020, extremes 1924–present)
Month	Jan	Feb	Mar	Apr	May	Jun	Jul	Aug	Sep	Oct	Nov	Dec	Year
Record high °C (°F)	4.9 (40.8)	6.7 (44.1)	27.7 (81.9)	34.2 (93.6)	40.2 (104.4)	42.9 (109.2)	44.6 (112.3)	43.2 (109.8)	39.7 (103.5)	30.9 (87.6)	17.6 (63.7)	7.5 (45.5)	44.6 (112.3)
Mean daily maximum °C (°F)	−9.1 (15.6)	−8.0 (17.6)	1.0 (33.8)	16.3 (61.3)	24.8 (76.6)	30.8 (87.4)	32.3 (90.1)	30.9 (87.6)	23.7 (74.7)	14.4 (57.9)	2.0 (35.6)	−6.2 (20.8)	12.7 (54.9)
Daily mean °C (°F)	−13.1 (8.4)	−12.6 (9.3)	−4.0 (24.8)	9.6 (49.3)	17.7 (63.9)	23.6 (74.5)	25.3 (77.5)	23.6 (74.5)	16.2 (61.2)	7.5 (45.5)	−2.5 (27.5)	−10.1 (13.8)	6.8 (44.2)
Mean daily minimum °C (°F)	−16.8 (1.8)	−16.7 (1.9)	−8.3 (17.1)	3.7 (38.7)	10.5 (50.9)	16.1 (61.0)	18.3 (64.9)	16.5 (61.7)	9.4 (48.9)	1.8 (35.2)	−6.0 (21.2)	−13.8 (7.2)	1.2 (34.2)
Record low °C (°F)	−41.4 (−42.5)	−40.0 (−40.0)	−36.3 (−33.3)	−18.9 (−2.0)	−4.5 (23.9)	2.2 (36.0)	6.2 (43.2)	3.9 (39.0)	−6.4 (20.5)	−16.1 (3.0)	−30.5 (−22.9)	−36.9 (−34.4)	−41.4 (−42.5)
Average precipitation mm (inches)	10.8 (0.43)	9.5 (0.37)	15.0 (0.59)	15.9 (0.63)	18.8 (0.74)	12.9 (0.51)	16.2 (0.64)	8.1 (0.32)	6.0 (0.24)	14.1 (0.56)	16.5 (0.65)	14.1 (0.56)	157.9 (6.22)
Average precipitation days (≥ 1.0 mm)	3.7	2.8	3.8	3.3	3.2	2.9	2.6	2.0	1.5	3.3	3.6	3.7	36.4
Mean monthly sunshine hours	114	159	199	261	334	354	365	345	279	181	118	103	2,812
Source 1: Pogoda.ru.net
Source 2: NOAA (sun 1961–1990)
