= Saryozen (Turgay basin) =

River in Kazakhstan

Saryozen Сарыөзен
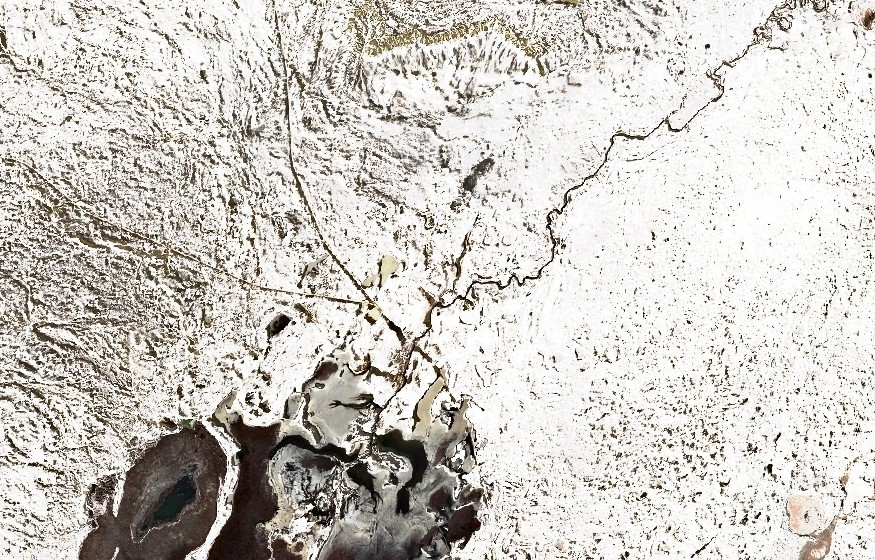
- Final stretch of the Saryozen (upper right) and mouth in lake Sarykopa Sentinel-2 image.

- Mouth location in Kazakhstan

Physical characteristics
- Source: Kazakh Uplands
  - location: Saryadyr
  - coordinates: 50°45′47″N 65°34′22″E
- Mouth: Sarykopa (Turgay)
  - coordinates: 50°25′11″N 64°12′42″E
  - elevation: 101 metres (331 ft)
- Length: 164 km (102 mi)
- Basin size: 10,100 km^{2} (3,900 sq mi)
- Discharge
  - average: 3.57 m^{3}/s (126 cu ft/s) at the mouth

The Saryozen (Kazakh: Сарыөзен), also known as Konyrauli (Kazakh: Қоңыраулы), is a river in the Zharkain District of Akmola Region and the Amangeldi and Zhangeldi districts of Kostanay Region, Kazakhstan. The river is 164 km (102 mi) long and the area of its basin is 10,100 km^{2} (3,900 sq mi).

== Geography ==
The Saryozen belongs to the Turgay basin. It has its sources in the Saryadyr plateau. It heads initially southwestwards, then it bends westwards and in its mid course it bends again and heads southwestwards. Finally it enters lake Sarykopa from the northeastern end. In years of high water the Saryozen river may flow across lake Sarykopa into the Turgay through a channel near Tauysh village. Its main tributary is the 133 km (83 mi) long Ulken Damdi from the right.

== See also ==
- List of rivers of Kazakhstan
