= Karsakpay =

Karsakpay Qarsaqpaı
- Location in Kazakhstan
- Coordinates: 47°50′0″N 66°45′0″E
- Country: Kazakhstan
- Region: Ulytau Region
- Creation: 1911

Area
  - Total: 3 km^{2} (1.2 sq mi)
- Elevation: 488 m (1,601 ft)

Population (2009)
  - Total: 1,668
- Time zone: UTC+6 (BTT)
- Area code: +7 7102

Karsakpay (Korsakpay Plant; Kazakh: Қарсақпай, Qarsaqpaı; Russian: Карсакпай), is a town in the Ulytau Region, Kazakhstan. The town had a population of 1,668 in the 2009 census, a decrease from 2,401 in the 1999 census. It is known for its cold climate and the beautiful lake it is situated next to.

== Geography ==
Karsakpay is located on a mostly flat and arid plain at about 500 metres (1,600 ft) above sea level. The town lies on the southern side of a dam.

== Climate ==
Karsakpay has a cold semi-arid climate (Köppen climate classification BSk), with very warm summers and frigid cold winters. Precipitation, either in the form of rain or snow, is quite frequent, but light, and does not follow any significant pattern over the year, with between 10 millimetres (0.39 in) and 20 millimetres (0.79 in) in each month. The average temperature ranges from 23.2 °C (73.8 °F) in July to −15.0 °C (5.0 °F) in January, whilst extremes range from 42.2 °C (108 °F) to −47.8 °C (−54.0 °F).

Climate data for Karsakpay
Month	Jan	Feb	Mar	Apr	May	Jun	Jul	Aug	Sep	Oct	Nov	Dec	Year
Record high °C (°F)	7.2 (45.0)	5.3 (41.5)	22.8 (73.0)	32.2 (90.0)	37.2 (99.0)	40.0 (104.0)	42.2 (108.0)	42.2 (108.0)	35.3 (95.5)	28.6 (83.5)	19.7 (67.5)	8.8 (47.8)	42.2 (108.0)
Mean daily maximum °C (°F)	−10.6 (12.9)	−9.7 (14.5)	−2.6 (27.3)	12.7 (54.9)	21.6 (70.9)	27.6 (81.7)	29.8 (85.6)	27.5 (81.5)	20.8 (69.4)	10.6 (51.1)	−0.2 (31.6)	−7.7 (18.1)	10.0 (50.0)
Daily mean °C (°F)	−15.0 (5.0)	−14.6 (5.7)	−7.5 (18.5)	6.1 (43.0)	14.8 (58.6)	21.0 (69.8)	23.2 (73.8)	20.6 (69.1)	13.6 (56.5)	4.3 (39.7)	−5.0 (23.0)	−12.0 (10.4)	4.1 (39.4)
Mean daily minimum °C (°F)	−19.3 (−2.7)	−19.2 (−2.6)	−11.9 (10.6)	0.6 (33.1)	7.5 (45.5)	13.3 (55.9)	15.9 (60.6)	13.2 (55.8)	6.7 (44.1)	−0.9 (30.4)	−8.8 (16.2)	−15.7 (3.7)	−1.5 (29.2)
Record low °C (°F)	−47.8 (−54.0)	−38.9 (−38.0)	−35.4 (−31.7)	−23.9 (−11.0)	−10.6 (12.9)	−0.1 (31.8)	6.1 (43.0)	1.7 (35.1)	−7.8 (18.0)	−18.9 (−2.0)	−33.2 (−27.8)	−39.8 (−39.6)	−47.8 (−54.0)
Average precipitation mm (inches)	19.2 (0.76)	10.8 (0.43)	15.1 (0.59)	19.5 (0.77)	14.9 (0.59)	15.3 (0.60)	17.3 (0.68)	10.7 (0.42)	11.0 (0.43)	18.5 (0.73)	13.6 (0.54)	15.1 (0.59)	181 (7.13)
Mean monthly sunshine hours	111	150	185	237	318	338	345	332	272	177	117	15.5	2,597.5
Source 1: climatebase.ru
Source 2: NOAA (sun only, 1961-1990)

== Transport ==
Karsakpay is connected by road to the city of Jezkazgan, 87 kilometres (54 mi) to the east. Other roads connect the town of Zhezdi to the north-east, and to the small settlements of Baykonyr, Kiyakty, and Koskol to the west.

== See also ==
- Karsakpay inscription
