= Zhangeldi District =

Coordinates: 49°48′36″N 63°43′12″E

Zhangeldi
- District
- Жангелді ауданы
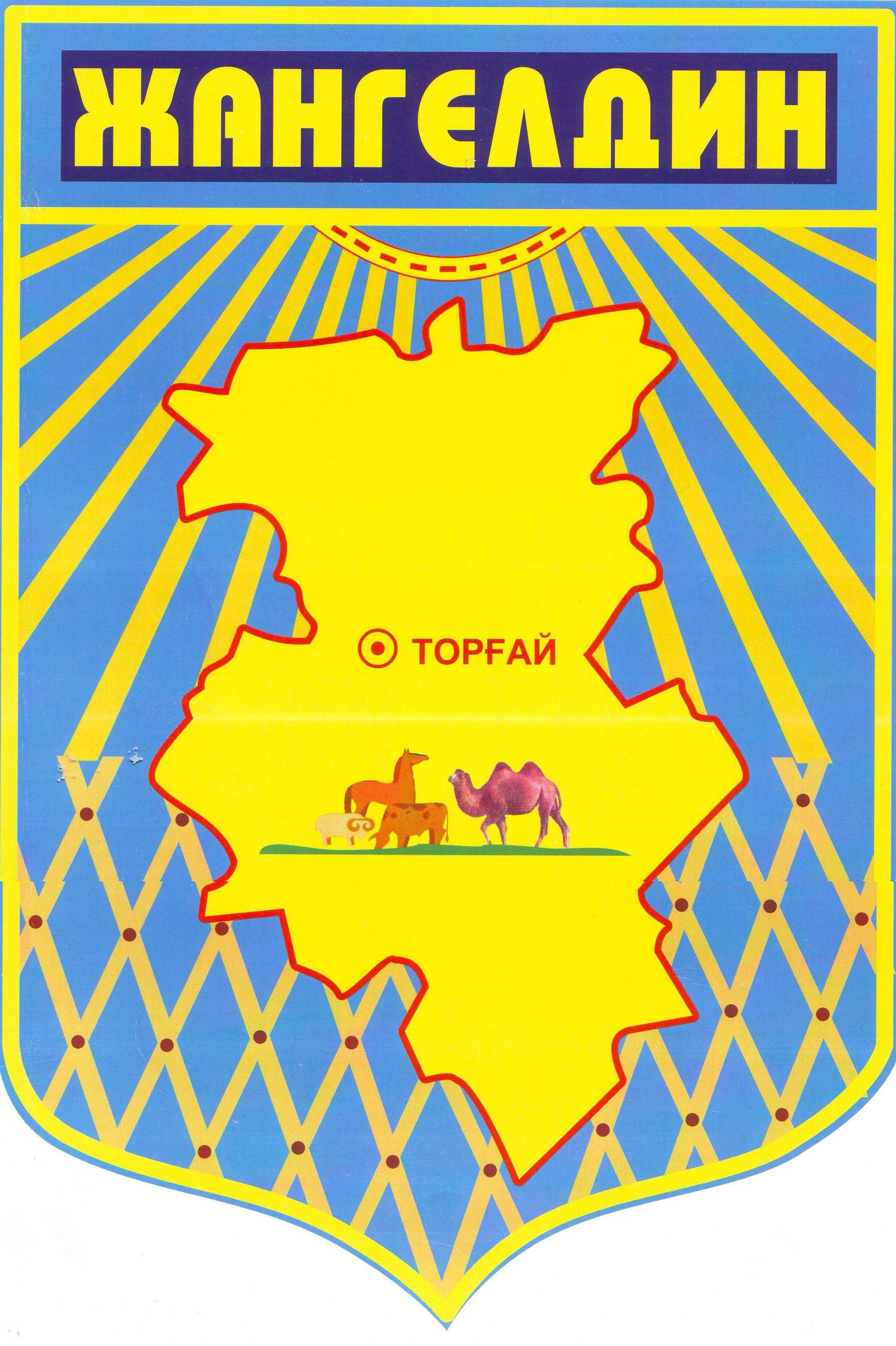
- Coat of arms

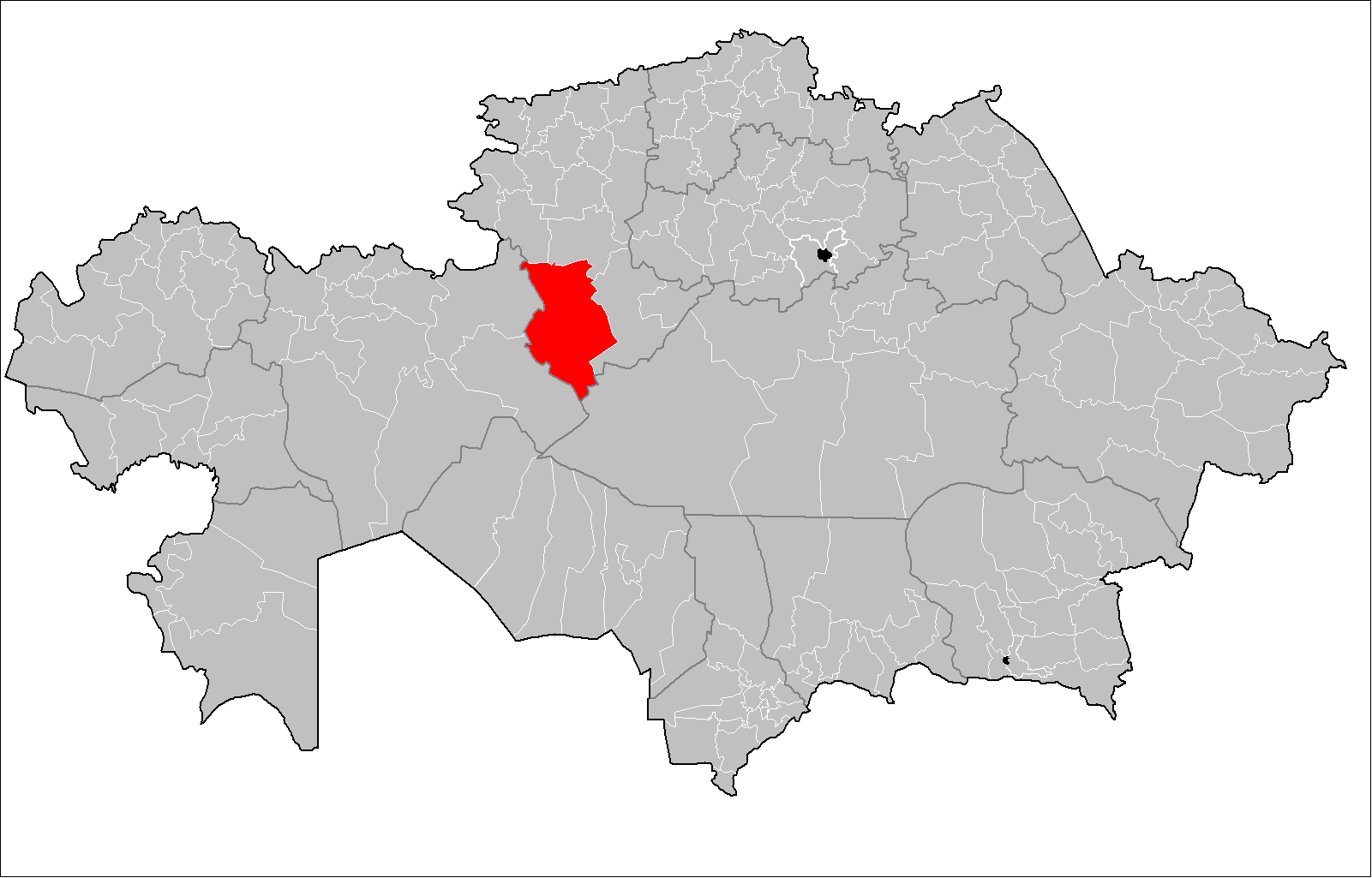
- Country: Kazakhstan
- Region: Kostanay Region
- Administrative center: Torgay

Government
  - Akim: Dinmukhanbet Bidashev

Area
  - Total: 97,000 km^{2} (37,600 sq mi)

Population (2013)
  - Total: 14,337
  - Density: 0.147/km^{2} (0.381/sq mi)
- Time zone: UTC+6 (East)
- Website: http://zhangeldy.kostanay.gov.kz/

Zhangeldi (Kazakh: Жангелді ауданы, Jangeldı audany) is a district of Kostanay Region in northern Kazakhstan. Named after Älıbi Jangeldin, a prominent Kazakh revolutionary, military commander, and diplomat during the Russian Civil War. The administrative center of the district is the selo of Torgay. Population: 14,337 (2013 estimate); 15,690 (2009 census results); 20,533 (1999 census results).

== Geography ==
Lakes Kushmurun and Sarykopa are located in the district. There are also numerous smaller salt lakes such as Zhamantuz.
