= Yrgyz District =

Coordinates: 48°36′N 62°09′E

Yrgyz
- District
- Yrğyz audany
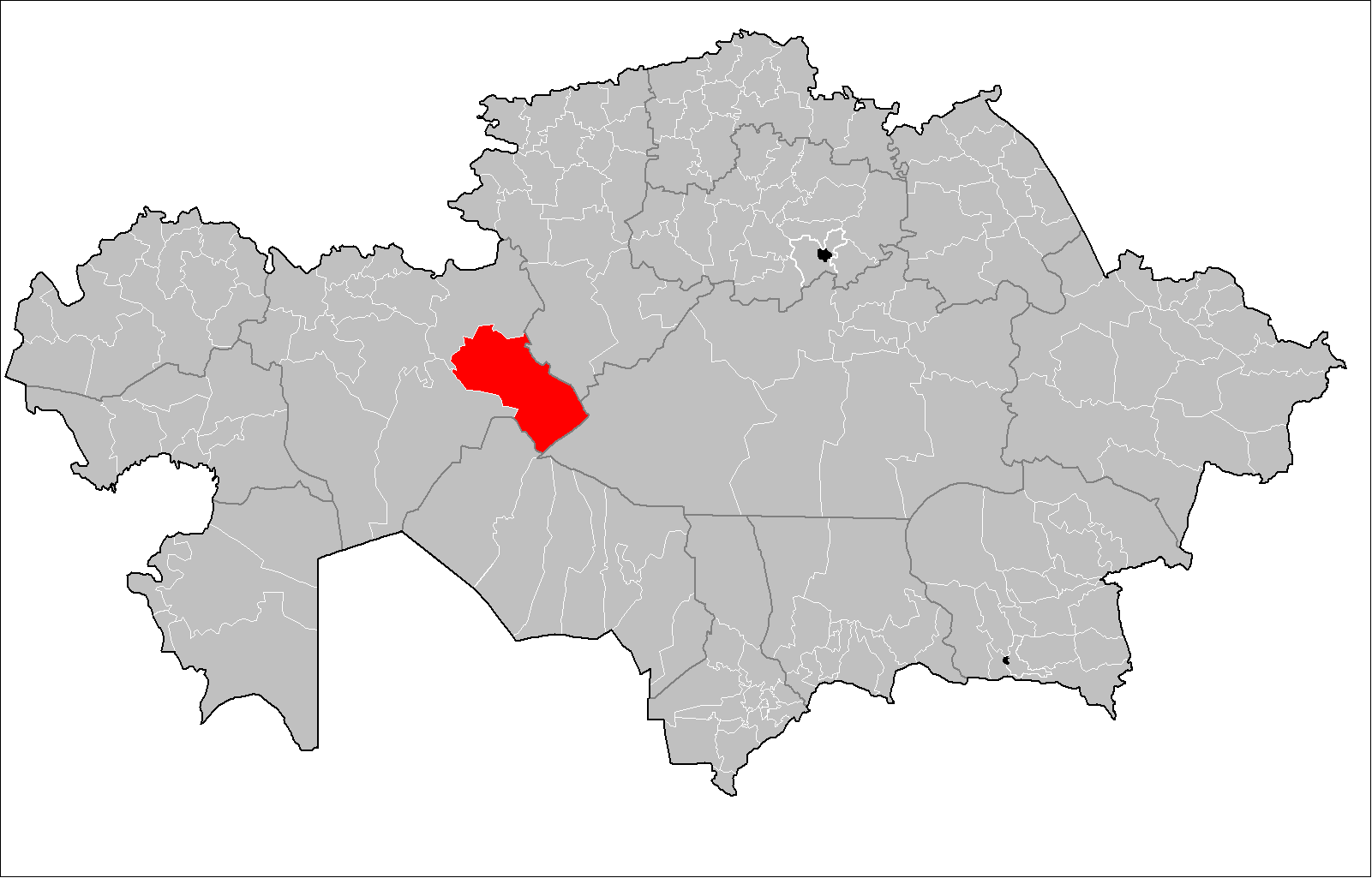
- Country: Kazakhstan
- Region: Aktobe Region
- Administrative center: Yrgyz

Government
  - Akim: Kyzbergenov Nurlan Kasymkhanuly

Population (2013)
  - Total: 15,060
- Time zone: UTC+5 (West)

Yrgyz District (Kazakh: Ырғыз ауданы, Yrğyz audany) is a district of Aktobe Region in Kazakhstan. The administrative center of the district is the selo of Yrgyz. Population: 15,060 (2013 estimate); 14,416 (2009 census results); 15,610 (1999 census results).

== Geography ==
The area of Yrgyz District is 41,500 square kilometers (16,000 sq mi). Shalkarteniz is located in the district. The Lakes of the lower Turgay and Irgiz Nature Reserve is a protected area located in the district.
