= Turgay (river) =

River in Kazakhstan

Turgay Торғай
- The Turgay in a map of the glacial lakes of Central Eurasia during the Ice Age

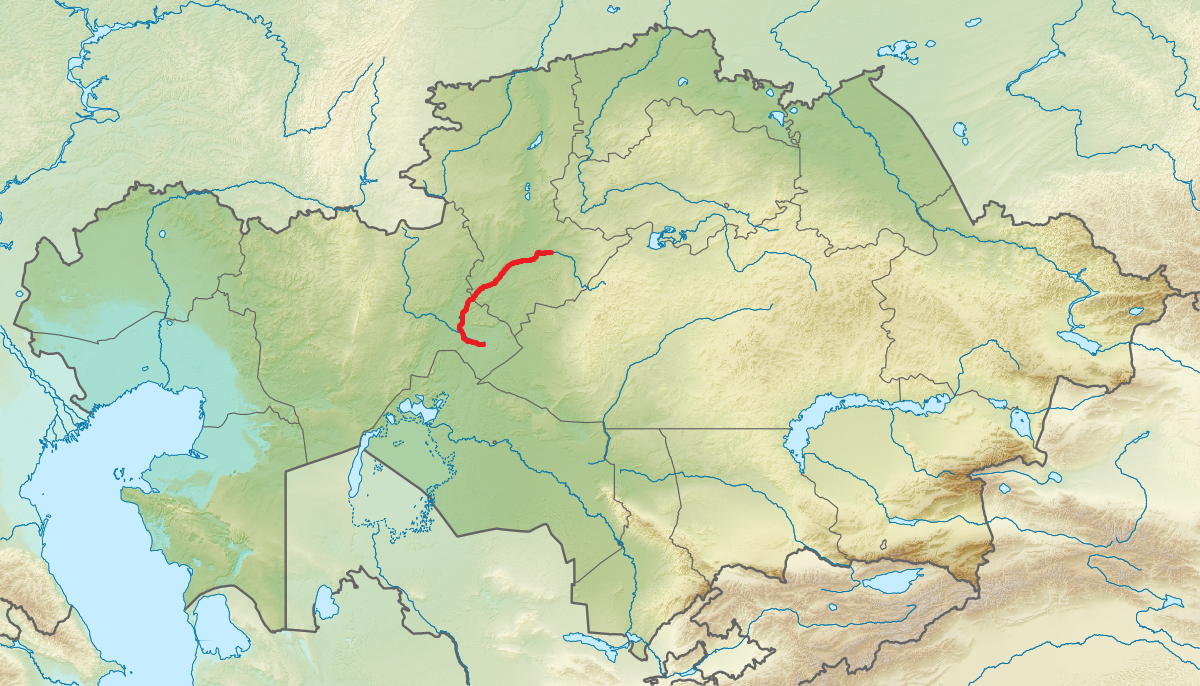
- Location within Kazakhstan

Location
- Country: Kazakhstan

Physical characteristics
- Mouth: Shalkarteniz
  - coordinates: 48°01′14″N 63°01′55″E
- Length: 825 km (513 mi)
- Basin size: 157,000 km^{2} (61,000 sq mi)
- Discharge
  - average: 9 m^{3}/s (320 cu ft/s)

The Turgay (Russian: Тургай [tʊrˈgaj]) or Torgai (Kazakh: Торғай [torˈʁɑj]) is a river in Kazakhstan. It has a length of 825 km (513 mi) and a drainage basin of 157,000 km^{2} (61,000 sq mi).

The Naurzum Nature Reserve is a protected area located in the river basin.

== Course ==
The river originates at the confluence of the Zhaldama and Kara-Turgai rivers, which have their sources in the Kazakh Uplands. It then flows along the Turgay Depression. The Turgay disappears in the endorheic basin of Shalkarteniz.

The Ubagan, a tributary of the Tobol, drains the valley to the north, the Turgay to the south. There are many shallow, often salty lakes in the valley. In the summer it dries up and its water becomes salty in the lower reaches of certain sections. The river is mostly fed by snow. It freezes in November and thaws in April.

=== Tributaries ===
The main tributaries of the Turgay are the 593 km (368 mi) long Irgiz, the 284 km (176 mi) long Karatorgai and the Kobarga on the left, as well as the Zhaldama, Tokanay and Ulkayak on the right. In years of high water the 164 kilometers (102 mi) long Saryozen river may flow across lake Sarykopa into the Turgay through a channel near Tauysh village.

== See also ==
- List of rivers of Kazakhstan
- Lakes of the lower Turgay and Irgiz
