= Tuzkol, Mendykara District =

Tuzkol
- Тұзкөл
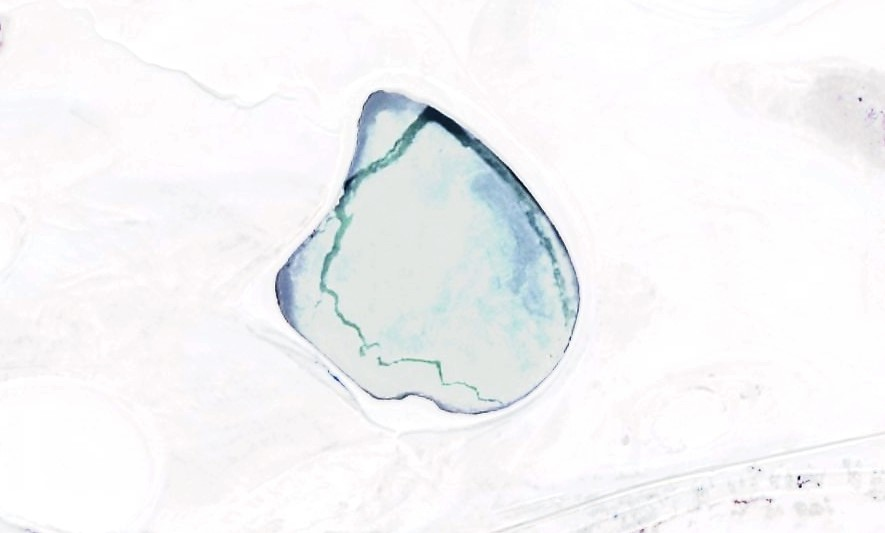
- Sentinel-2 picture of the lake in January

- Location within Kazakhstan
- Location: Turgay Depression
- Coordinates: 53°54′25″N 64°39′38″E
- Type: Salt lake
- Basin countries: Kazakhstan
- Max. length: 2 kilometers (1.2 mi)
- Max. width: 1.9 kilometers (1.2 mi)
- Surface area: 2.43 square kilometers (0.94 sq mi)
- Shore length^{1}: 7.6 kilometers (4.7 mi)
- Surface elevation: 90.4 meters (297 ft)
- Islands: none
- Settlements: Sosna, Aksuat
- ^{1} Shore length is not a well-defined measure.

Tuzkol (Kazakh: Тұзкөл) is a salt lake in Mendykara District, Kostanay Region, Kazakhstan.

The lake lies roughly 30 kilometers (19 mi) ENE of Borovskoy, the district capital, 10 kilometers (6.2 mi) northeast of Sosna and 1 kilometer (0.62 mi) north of Aksuat.

== Geography ==
Tuzkol lies in the Turgay Depression, 50 kilometers (31 mi) to the south of the Kazakhstan–Russia border. Larger Alakol lake is located to the south of the southern shore and Teniz 18 kilometers (11 mi) to the NNW. River Ubagan flows northwards 18 kilometers (11 mi) to the east of Tuzkol's eastern shore. The lake freezes in the winter.

The A21 Highway skirts the lake on its southern part.

== See also ==
- List of lakes of Kazakhstan
