= Teniz, Mendykara District =

Lake in Kazakhstan

Teniz
- Теңіз
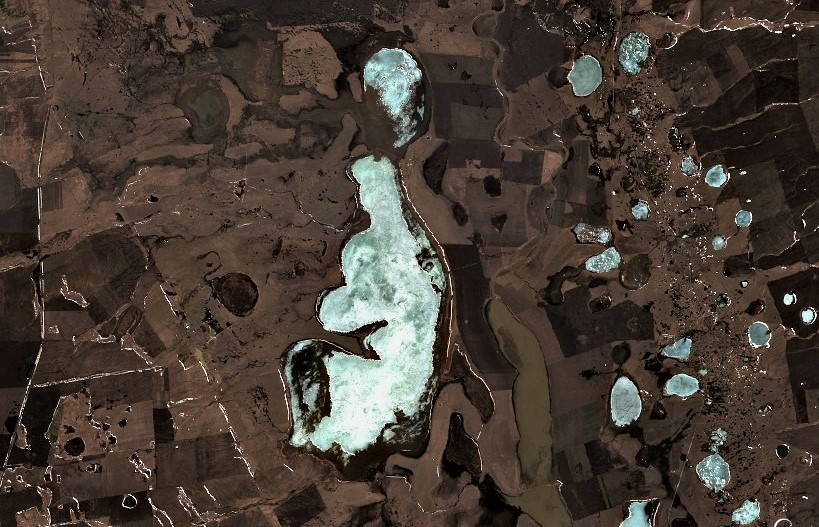
- Sentinel-2 picture of the lake in April

- Location within Kazakhstan
- Location: Turgay Depression
- Coordinates: 54°07′38″N 64°33′37″E
- Primary inflows: Karasu
- Basin countries: Kazakhstan
- Max. length: 14.7 kilometers (9.1 mi)
- Max. width: 7.3 kilometers (4.5 mi)
- Surface area: 64.2 square kilometers (24.8 sq mi)
- Shore length^{1}: 44.4 kilometers (27.6 mi)
- Surface elevation: 89.4 meters (293 ft)
- ^{1} Shore length is not a well-defined measure.

Teniz (Kazakh: Теңіз; Russian: Тениз) is a lake in Mendykara District, Kostanay Region, Kazakhstan.

The lake is part of the most important wetlands of Northern Kazakhstan and is a 12,528 hectares (30,960 acres) Important Bird Area under threat.

== Geography ==
Teniz lies in the Turgay Depression, about 20 kilometers (12 mi) to the south of the Kazakhstan–Russia border. It is an elongated lake, stretching from north to south for 14.7 kilometers (9.1 mi). Its maximum width is 7.3 kilometers (4.5 mi). Lake Karakamys is located close by at the northern end, as a continuation. Tuzkol salt lake is located 18 kilometers (11 mi) to the SSE. River Ubagan flows northwards 10 kilometers (6.2 mi) to the east of the lake's eastern shore. The lake freezes in the winter and is fed by snow and groundwater.

The lake lies roughly 40 kilometers (25 mi) northeast of Borovskoy, the district capital, 12 kilometers (7.5 mi) west of Krasnaya Presnya village and 5 kilometers (3.1 mi) east of Tenizovskoye; the villages of Kamyshny and Talapker are located by the lakeshore.

== Flora and fauna ==
There is thick reed growth around the lake. Every year there are thousands of migratory birds stopping over at the Teniz and Karakamys lakes during the spring and autumn migrations. The main fish species in the waters are crucian carp, wild goldfish and lake minnow.

== See also ==
- List of lakes of Kazakhstan
