= Steppe Geoglyphs =

Prehistoric earthworks in Kazakhstan

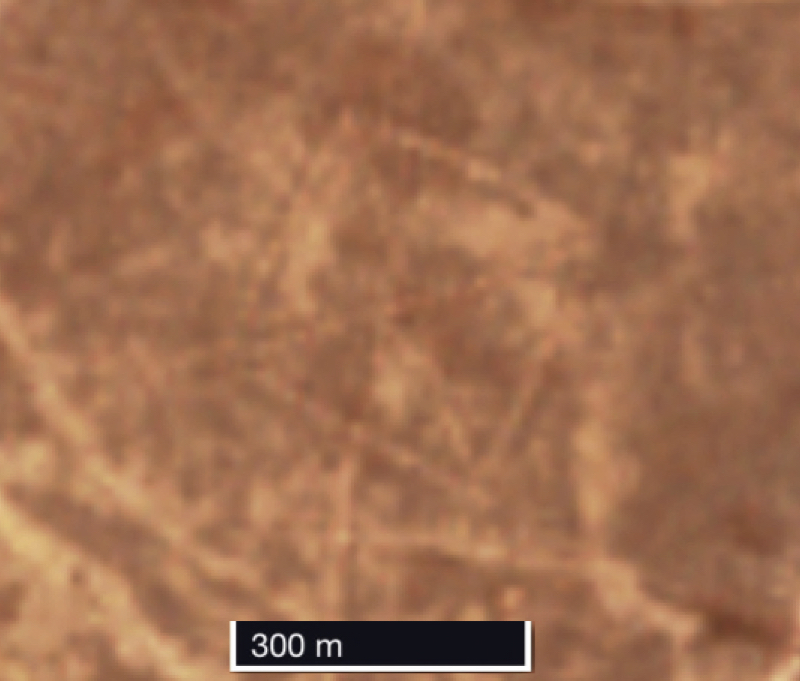
Ushtogay Square at 50.832933°N 65.326276°E

The Steppe Geoglyphs are a number of earth constructions in the Turgai Trough area of Turgai in northern Kazakhstan. There are at least 260 of these earthworks.

== The constructions ==
Many or all of them consist of smaller earthworks (mounds, trenches, and ramparts) arranged with each other to make geometric and other shapes (composite figures). These shapes are squares, rings, and three others. The composite figures range from slightly under 90 m in length to over 400 m in diameter. Besides being made of earth dug out and piled up, some of the geoglyphs are made by placing stones next to each other.

Some of the large shapes have been given names, including Bestamskoe Ring, Ushtogaysky (or Ushtogay) Square, Turgay triradial swastika, Large cross Ashtasti, Ekedyn cross, Ashutasti ring, Kyzyloba line, Koga cross, and Shili square.

These shapes are large enough to be easily visible on Google Earth. The Ushtogay Square is at 50.832933°N 65.326276°E. The Turgay triradial is at 50.102778°N 65.360833°E, only about 800 metres (1/2 mi) from the town of Urpek. Both are inside Amangeldi District, Kostanay Region.

== Discovery and suggested origins ==
The earthworks were discovered in 2007 by Dimitriy Dey. He found them by searching Google Earth's satellite images for pyramids and similar configurations in Kazakhstan. They were first reported to the scientific community in 2014.

Optical dating (optically stimulated luminescence) has been used to determine that one of the mounds dates to around 8000 B.C.E.
