= Koybagar =

Lake in the country of Kazakhstan

- Қойбағар / Койбагар
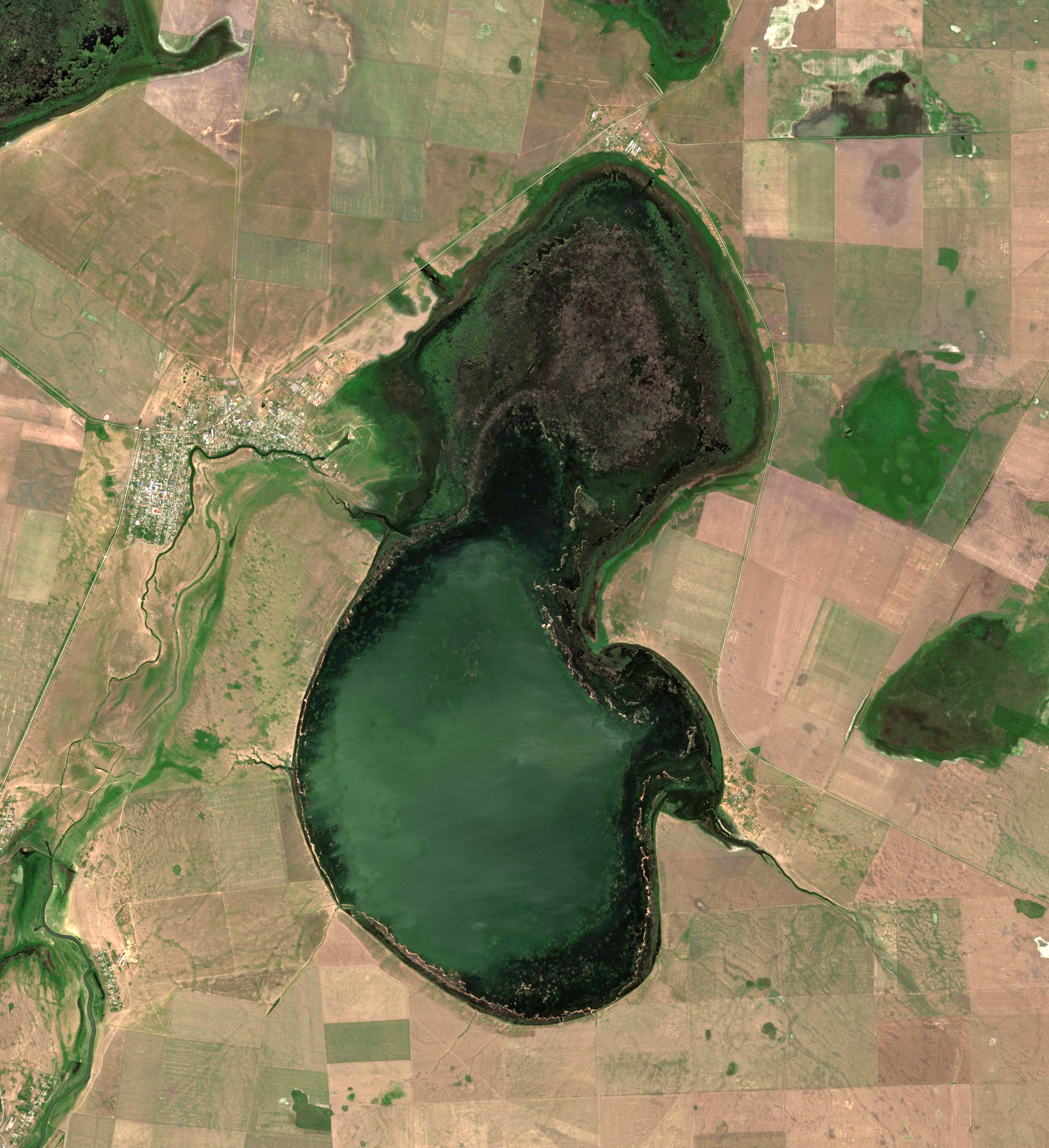
- Sentinel-2 image of the lake in 2021.

- Location within Kazakhstan
- Location: Turgay Basin
- Coordinates: 52°37′N 65°36′E
- Type: endorheic
- Primary inflows: Karasu
- Primary outflows: none
- Basin countries: Kazakhstan
- Max. length: 17.8 kilometers (11.1 mi)
- Max. width: 9.1 kilometers (5.7 mi)
- Surface area: 96 square kilometers (37 sq mi)
- Max. depth: 1.6 meters (5 ft 3 in)
- Water volume: 0.02 cubic kilometers (0.0048 cu mi)
- Shore length^{1}: 49 kilometers (30 mi)
- Surface elevation: 202 meters (663 ft)
- ^{1} Shore length is not a well-defined measure.

Koybagar (Kazakh: Қойбағар; Russian: Койбагар) is a lake in the Kostanay Region, Kazakhstan.

Koybagar is a steppe lake of the central sector of the Turgay Basin in Karasu District, Kostanay Region. Karasu village is located 5 kilometers (3.1 mi) west of the lake. The lake is part of the Koibagar-Tyuntyugur Lake System, a Ramsar site, since 2009.

== Geography ==
Koybagar is an endorheic lake lying in an isolated basin encircled by an unbroken wall of clay cliffs varying in height from 3 meters (9.8 ft) to 10 meters (33 ft). It is located between the larger Kushmurun lake to the west and the smaller Tyuntyugur to the east. The lake stretches roughly from north to south. The Karasu river flows into the western shore of the lake.

In years of heavy snowfall the lake may reach a surface area of 127 square kilometers (49 sq mi) and the water becomes fresh. Usually during the dry season in the summer the lake shrinks, the northern part dries up and the water of the southern part turns brackish. The lakeshore is largely slightly sloping and low-lying.

== Fauna ==
The lake is part of the Koybagar-Tyuntyugur lake group. It is a critical site for waterbirds such as the lesser white-fronted goose, red-breasted goose, glaucous gull and the critically endangered siberian crane. There are ten different fish species in the lake, including perch and pike.

== See also ==
- List of lakes of Kazakhstan
- List of Ramsar Wetlands of International Importance
