= Katpagan =

Lake in Kazakhstan

- Қатпаған
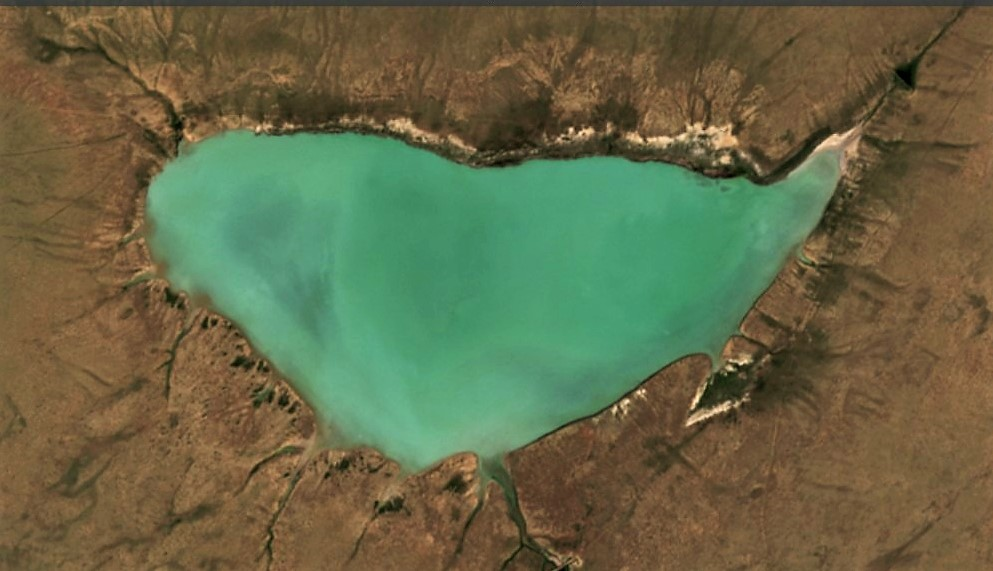
- Sentinel-2 picture of the lake in June

- Location within Kazakhstan
- Location: Turgay Depression
- Coordinates: 49°41′22″N 65°21′07″E
- Type: endorheic lake
- Basin countries: Kazakhstan
- Max. length: 4.2 kilometers (2.6 mi)
- Max. width: 1.9 kilometers (1.2 mi)
- Surface area: 6.8 square kilometers (2.6 sq mi)
- Residence time: UTC+5:00
- Surface elevation: 196 meters (643 ft)
- Islands: no

Katpagan (Kazakh: Қатпаған) is a salt lake in Amangeldi District, Kostanay Region, Kazakhstan.

The lake is located 52 kilometers (32 mi) to the south of Amangeldi, the district capital. The area is quite desolate, with few settlements.

== Geography ==
Katpagan is an endorheic lake of the Turgay Depression and is part of the Uly-Zhylanshyk river basin. The lake lies at an elevation of 111 meters (364 ft) surrounded by numerous small lakes. The Uly-Zhylanshyk flows about 40 kilometers (25 mi) to the southwest of the southern shore. Smaller lake Kishi Katpagan lies 3.8 kilometers (2.4 mi) to the south and Zhaltyrsor 29 kilometers (18 mi) to the northwest.

Katpagan has a roughly semicircular shape, stretching for over 4 kilometers (2.5 mi) in an east–west direction. The lake fills with snow and groundwater. It freezes at the end of November and thaws by the end of March. Katpagan partly dries in the summer, the shores becoming a salt marsh as the water recedes.

== Flora and fauna ==
Typha and Phragmites reeds grow by the shore of Katpagan. The lake basin is surrounded by steppe vegetation.

== See also ==
- List of lakes of Kazakhstan
