= Tyuntyugur =

Lake in Kazakhstan

- Тімтуір / Тюнтюгур
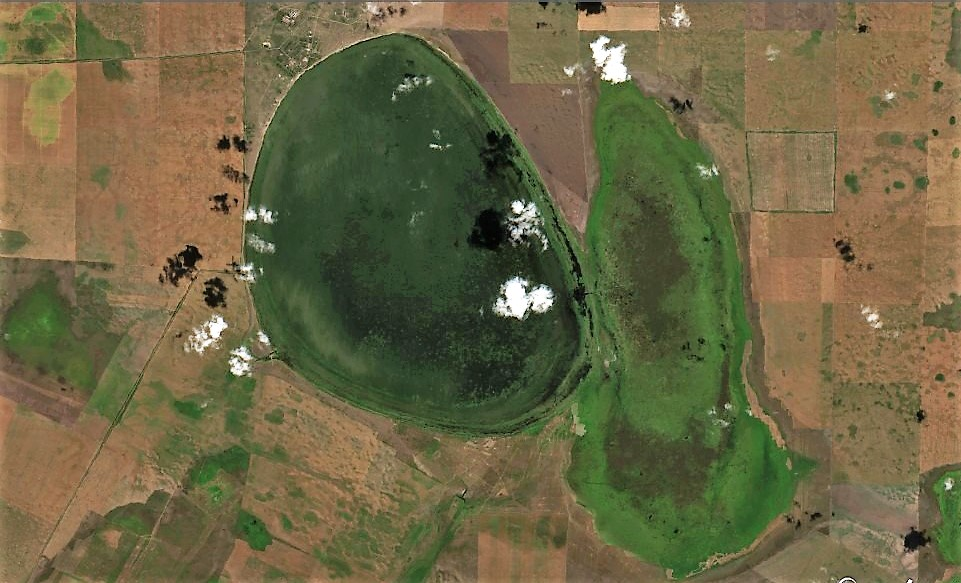
- Sentinel-2 image of Tyuntyugur and Zhanshura lakes in 2022.

- Location within Kazakhstan
- Location: Turgay Basin
- Coordinates: 52°41′N 65°50′E
- Type: endorheic
- Primary inflows: Tyuntyugur
- Primary outflows: none
- Catchment area: 3,570 square kilometers (1,380 sq mi)
- Basin countries: Kazakhstan
- Max. length: 9.5 kilometers (5.9 mi)
- Max. width: 6.9 kilometers (4.3 mi)
- Surface area: 54.3 square kilometers (21.0 sq mi)
- Average depth: 1.6 meters (5 ft 3 in)
- Max. depth: 3 meters (9.8 ft)
- Water volume: 0.08 cubic kilometers (0.019 cu mi)
- Shore length^{1}: 27.4 kilometers (17.0 mi)
- Surface elevation: 203 meters (666 ft)
- ^{1} Shore length is not a well-defined measure.

Tyuntyugur (Kazakh: Тімтуір; Russian: Тюнтюгур) is a lake in the Kostanay Region, Kazakhstan.

Tyuntyugur is a steppe lake of the central sector of the Turgay Basin in Karasu District, Kostanay Region. By the northern shore lies the small village of Tyuntyugur and the administrative center of the district, Karasu village, is located 15 kilometers (9.3 mi) to the west of the western lakeshore. Tyuntyugur is part of the Koibagar-Tyuntyugur Lake System, a 58,000 hectares (140,000 acres) Ramsar site, since 2009.

== Geography ==
Tyuntyugur is an endorheic lake lying 6 kilometers (3.7 mi) to the east of the larger Koybagar lake. The lake has a regular, roughly oval, shape. Its water is brackish. The smaller and elongated lake Zhanshura lies close to the east. They are separated by a landspit that is at its narrowest in the area of the southeastern shore of lake Tyuntyugur, where the western shore of lake Zhanshura is only 1 kilometer (0.62 mi) away. The Tyuntyugur river flows from the south into the southern end of the lake.

The eastern shore of lake Tyuntyugur is bound by about 4.5 meters (15 ft) high cliffs, while the southern coastline is flat and muddy. The lake is fed by snow and freezes every winter, shrinking significantly in years of drought. Tyuntyugur is surrounded by agricultural fields and its water is used for irrigation, which contributes to increasing siltation.

== Fauna ==
The lake is part of the Koybagar-Tyuntyugur lake group. It is a critical site for nesting, migration and molting of 39 waterfowl and wetland bird species, such as the greylag goose, mallard, gadwall, garganey, common pochard, tufted duck and Eurasian coot. 13 species of birds that visit the lake are listed as critically endangered, such as the siberian crane and the gyrfalcon. There are ten different fish species in the lake, including perch and pike.

== See also ==
- List of lakes of Kazakhstan
- List of Ramsar Wetlands of International Importance
