= Urpek =

Village in Amangeldi District, Kostanay, Kazakhstan

Urpek is a village in Amangeldi District of Kostanay Region, northern Kazakhstan.

== Geoglyph ==
The Turgay triradial swastika, one of a number of Neolithic earth constructions known to archaeologists as Steppe Geoglyphs, is at 50.102778°N 65.360833°E, only about half a mile east of Urpek.
