= Ismagulov =

Ismagulov (masculine, Russian: Исмагулов) or Ismagulova (feminine, Russian: Исмагулова) is a Russian surname. Notable people with the surname include:

- Damir Ismagulov (born 1991), Russian mixed martial artist
- Orazak Ismagulov (born 1930), Kazakh anthropologist
