= Uly-Zhylanshyk =

River in Kazakhstan

Uly-Zhylanshyk Ұлы Жыланшық / Улы-Жыланшык
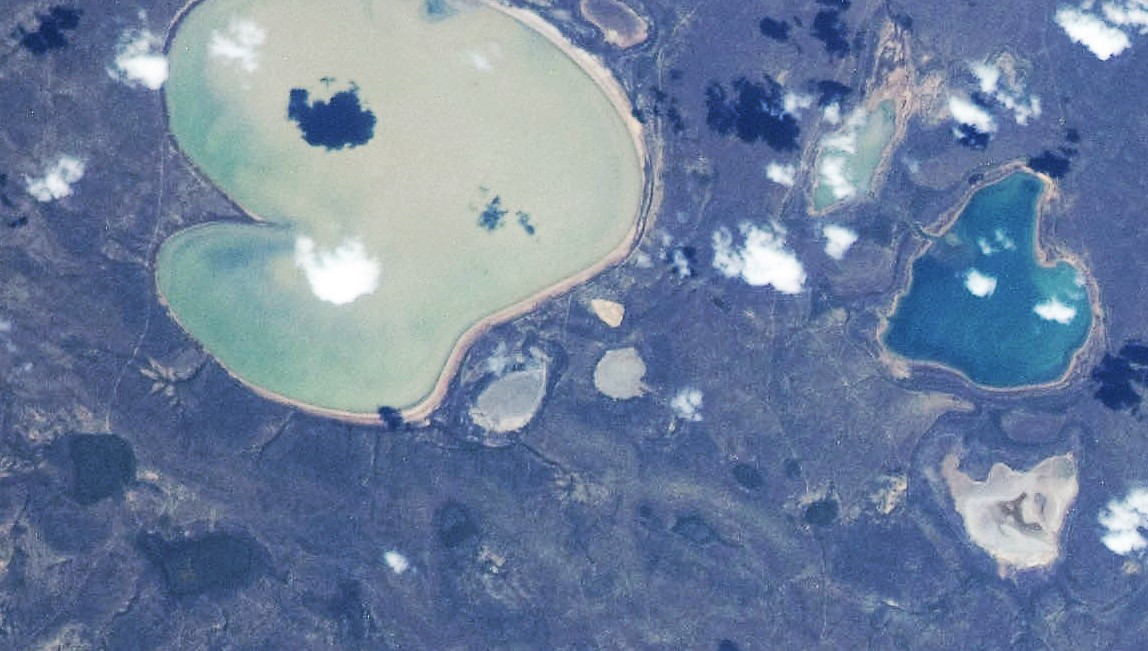
- ISS image of Lake Akkol, where the Uly-Zhylanshyk has its mouth

- Mouth location in Kazakhstan

Location
- Countries: Kazakhstan

Physical characteristics
- Source: Ulytau; Kazakh Uplands
  - coordinates: 48°53′52″N 65°31′52″E
  - elevation: 190 metres (620 ft)
- Mouth: Akkol
  - coordinates: 48°51′04″N 63°46′42″E
  - elevation: 103 metres (338 ft)
- Length: 277 km (172 mi)
- Basin size: 26,100 km^{2} (10,100 sq mi)

The Uly-Zhylanshyk (Kazakh: Ұлы Жыланшық; Russian: Улы-Жыланшык) is a river in Kazakhstan. It is 277 kilometres (172 mi) long and has a catchment area of 26,100 square kilometres (10,100 sq mi).

It is one of the rivers of the Turgay Depression, flowing across the Amangeldi and Zhangeldi districts of the Kostanay Region, Kazakhstan. Its waters are used for irrigation.

== Course ==
The river is formed at the confluence of rivers Dulygaly-Zhylanshyk from the right and the Ulken-Zhylanshyk from the left. Both have their sources in the Ulytau range of the Kazakh Uplands. The Uly-Zhylanshyk flows roughly westwards all along its course, sometimes bending northwest for a certain distance and others to the southwest. As it reaches its last stretch the river meanders strongly. Finally it flows into the northeastern shore of Lake Aqköl, an endorheic salt lake located in Zhangeldi District, north of Shalkarteniz. Lake Katpagan is located in its basin. The Uly-Zhylanshyk is fed mainly by snow.

== See also ==
- List of rivers of Kazakhstan
