= Zhaltyr =

Zhaltyr may refer to:

- Zhaltyr (North Kazakhstan Region), a lake in Shal akyn District, Kazakhstan
- Zhaltyr (Pavlodar Region), a lake in Akkuly District, Kazakhstan
- Zhaltyrsor, a lake in Amangeldi District, Kostanay Region, Kazakhstan
