= Zhaltyrsor =

Lake in Kazakhstan

- Жалтырсор
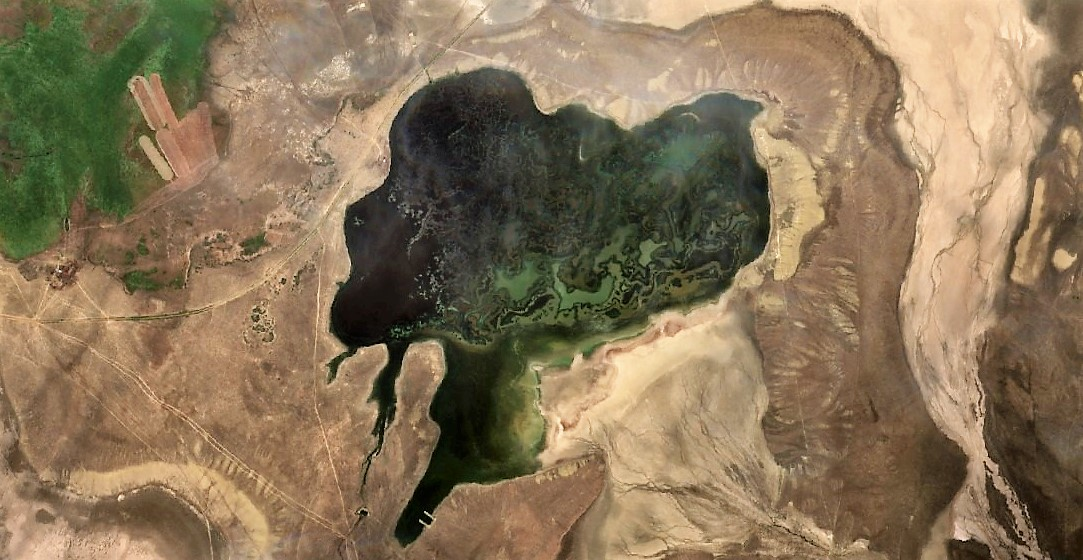
- Sentinel-2 picture of the lake in July

- Location within Kazakhstan
- Location: Turgay Depression
- Coordinates: 49°52′39″N 64°58′51″E
- Type: exorheic lake
- Basin countries: Kazakhstan
- Max. length: 5.6 kilometers (3.5 mi)
- Max. width: 3.4 kilometers (2.1 mi)
- Surface area: 13.2 square kilometers (5.1 sq mi)
- Residence time: UTC+5:00
- Surface elevation: 124.2 meters (407 ft)
- Settlements: Kabyrga

Zhaltyrsor (Kazakh: Жалтырсор) is a lake in Amangeldi District, Kostanay Region, Kazakhstan.

The lake is located 7 kilometers (4.3 mi) to the ESE of Kabyrga village and 34 kilometers (21 mi) to the southwest of Amangeldi, the district capital.

== Geography ==
Zhaltyrsor is a exorheic lake of the Turgay Depression and is part of the Turgay river basin. The lake lies at an elevation of 124 meters (407 ft) within the floodplain of the Tenteksay (Тентексай), a tributary of the Turgay, and is connected to it during spring floods. Lake Katpagan lies 29 kilometers (18 mi) to the southeast.

Zhaltyrsor stretches for over 5 kilometers (3.1 mi) in an east–west direction. The lake fills with snow and groundwater. It freezes at the end of November and thaws by the end of March. The shore is flat, with rocky and swampy stretches. In the summer the level of the lake sinks and it becomes a salt marsh.

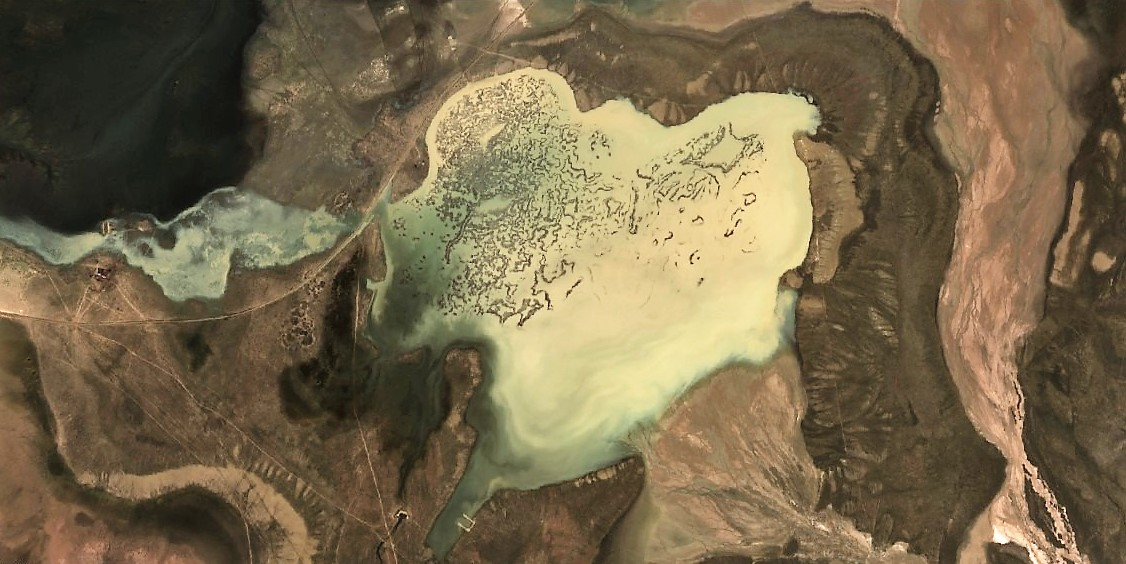
Zhaltyrsor during spring floods.

== Flora and fauna ==
The lake basin is surrounded by steppe vegetation and is used as a pasture for local cattle. The water becomes salty in the summer, but it can be used for watering and livestock in the spring.

== See also ==
- List of lakes of Kazakhstan
