= Auliekol =

Auliekol Әулиекөл
- Village
- Location in Kazakhstan
- Coordinates: 52°22′N 64°08′E
- Country: Kazakhstan
- Region: Kostanay Region
- District: Auliekol District

Population (2009)
  - Total: 11,692
- Time zone: UTC+6 (East)
- Postal code: 110400

Auliekol (Kazakh: Әулиекөл, Äulieköl), known as Semiozernoye until 1997, is a village and the administrative center of Auliekol District in Kostanay Region of north-western Kazakhstan. The population is 11,692 (2009 census results).
