= Aqköl (lake) =

Salt lake in Kazakhstan

- Kazakh: Ақкөл; Russian: Акколь
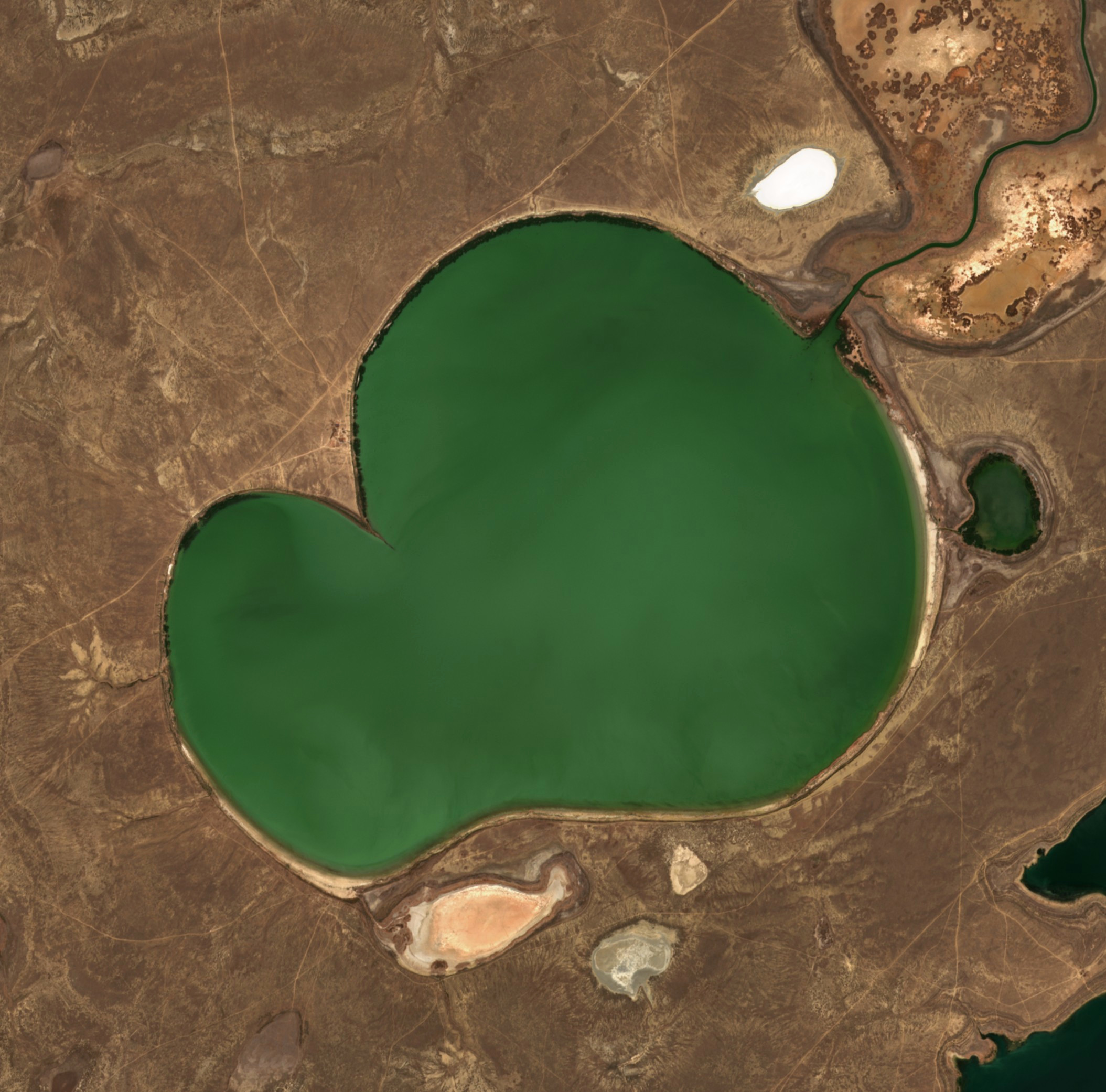
- Sentinel-2 image of the lake in 2021

- Location within Kazakhstan
- Location: Turgay Depression
- Coordinates: 48°49′N 63°44′E
- Type: endorheic
- Primary inflows: Uly-Zhylanshyk
- Basin countries: Kazakhstan
- Max. length: 10.5 kilometers (6.5 mi)
- Max. width: 8 kilometers (5.0 mi)
- Max. depth: 14 meters (46 ft)
- Surface elevation: 103 meters (338 ft)
- Islands: None

Aqköl (Kazakh: Ақкөл; Russian: Акколь), is a salt lake in Zhangeldi District, in the SW sector of the Kostanay Region, Kazakhstan.

Local authorities try to promote tourism in the lake, but the area lacks the necessary infrastructure. The nearest inhabited locality is Akhmeta Baytursynuly 10 kilometers (6.2 mi) to the east of the eastern shore.

== Geography ==
Aqköl is located in the southern part of the Turgay Depression at 103 meters (338 ft) above sea level. It is an endorheic lake sharing the same depression as smaller lakes and salt pans nearby. A projecting spit in the northwestern shore of the lake divides the northern side into two bays. The lake lies about 50 kilometers (31 mi) to the NNE of the northern end of the Shalkarteniz lake. Much smaller lakes Uziqsor and Qaraqsor are located to the southeast, close to its shores. There is a hot spring 30 kilometers (19 mi) from the lake where the water temperature reaches 70 °C (158 °F)

277 kilometers (172 mi) long river Uly-Zhylanshyk flows into the northeastern shore of the lake.

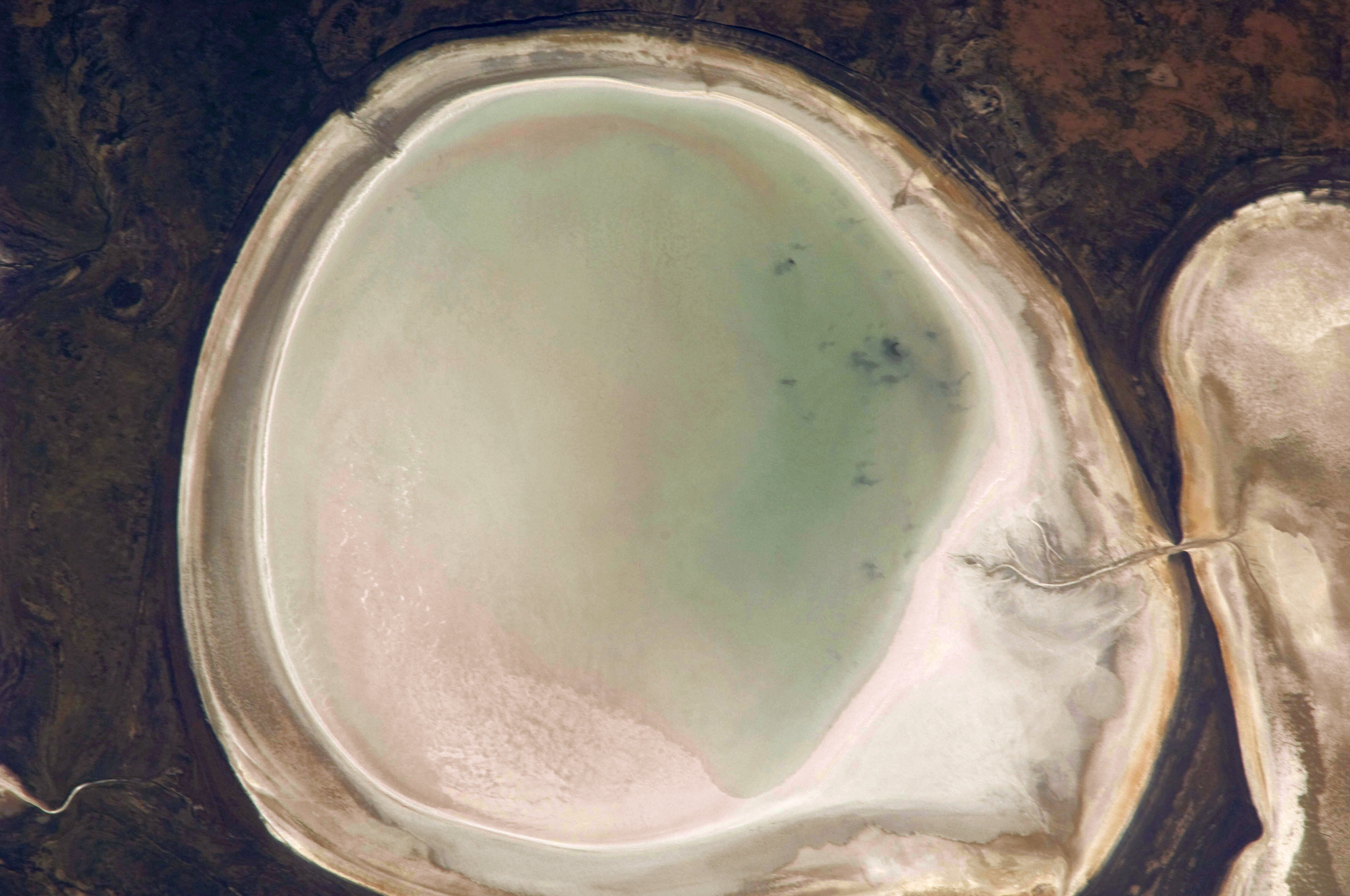
ISS view of the salt pans that lie 15 kilometers (9.3 mi) north of Akkol.

== See also ==
- List of lakes of Kazakhstan
