= Auliekol District =

Coordinates: 52°21′00″N 64°07′48″E

Auliekol
- District
- Әулиекөл ауданы
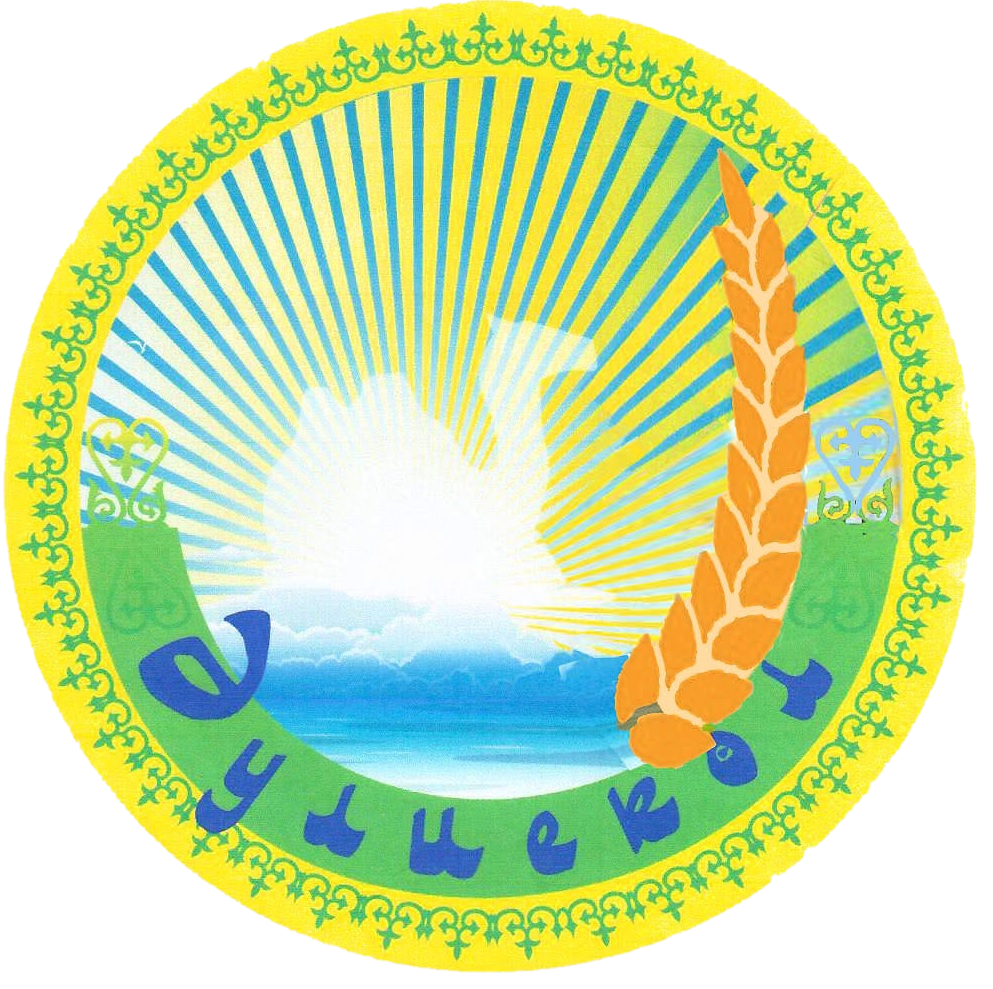
- Seal

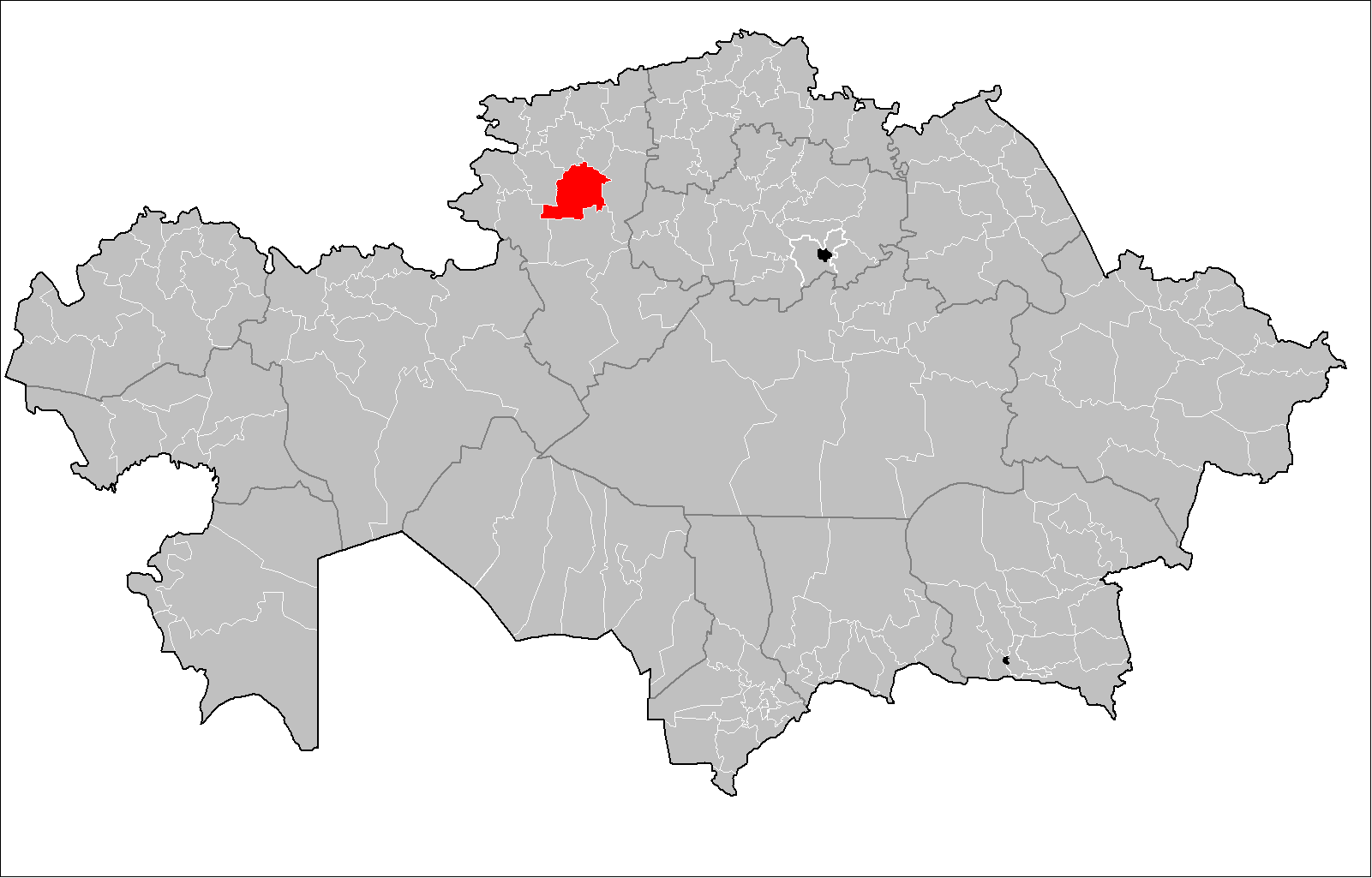
- Country: Kazakhstan
- Region: Kostanay Region
- Administrative center: Auliekol

Government
  - Akim: Zhansultan Taukenov

Population (2013)
  - Total: 46,071
- Time zone: UTC+6 (East)

Auliekol (Kazakh: Әулиекөл ауданы, Äulieköl audany) is a district of Kostanay Region in northern Kazakhstan. The administrative center of the district is the selo of Auliekol. Population: 46,071 (2013 estimate); 47,538 (2009 census results); 55,338 (1999 census results).

== Geography ==
Lake Kushmurun is located in the district, at the border with neighboring Karasu District.
