= Barak Kol (lake) =

Lake in Kazakhstan

Barakkol
- Барақкөл
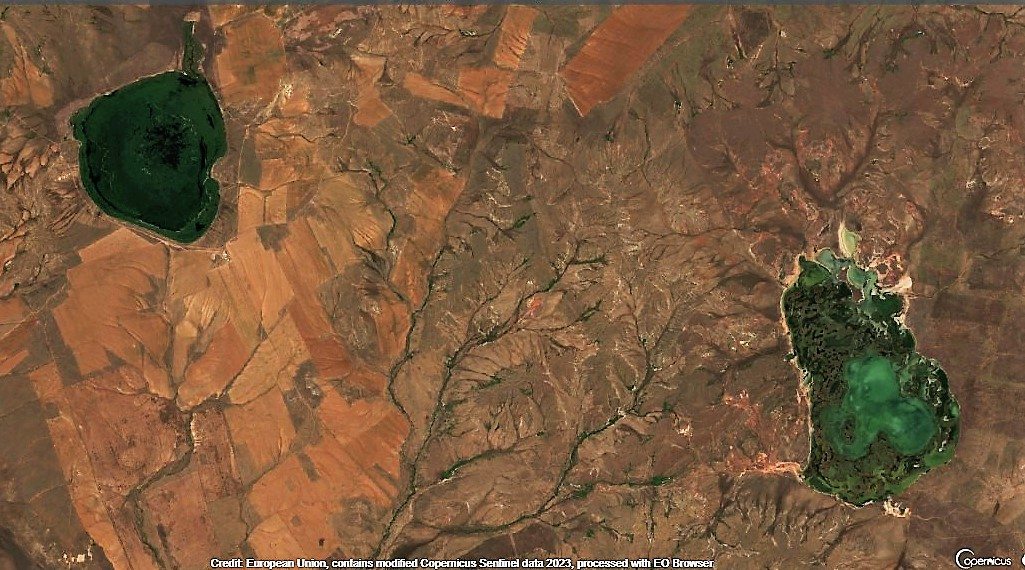
- Lakes Barakkol (left) and Ashchykol (right) Sentinel-2 image

- Location within Kazakhstan
- Location: Ulytau District, Ulytau Region, Kazakhstan
- Coordinates: 49°18′43″N 67°16′33″E
- Type: lake
- Max. length: 4 kilometres (2.5 mi)
- Max. width: 3.5 kilometres (2.2 mi)
- Surface area: 12 square kilometres (4.6 sq mi)
- Average depth: 2.9 metres (9 ft 6 in)

Barakkol (Kazakh: Барақкөл, Baraqköl) is a lake in Ulytau District, Ulytau Region, central Kazakhstan.

Barakkol is part of the proposed Ulytau-Arganatinsk nature reserve. The nearest settlement is Arganatinsk. Köl is the word for lake in Turkic languages, and Baraq was a khan of the Chagatai Khanate, a great-great-grandson of Genghis Khan.

== Geography ==
Barakkol is a freshwater lake of the Turgay Depression. It is approximately 3.5 kilometres (3,500 m) wide and 4 kilometres (4,000 m) long. Lake Ashchykol lies 15 kilometres (9.3 mi) to the ESE. The lake is located between the Gora Akdongul and Gora Baygetobe mountains in a shallow valley narrowing out to the north and open to the south with low hills to the northeast and northwest.

== Flora and fauna ==
The lake has reeds growing along the shores. Together with lake Ashchykol to the ESE, Barakkol is an important wetland for migrating geese, specifically Anser anser, the greylag goose, and Anser erythropus, the lesser white-fronted goose.
