= Orazak Ismagulov =

Kazakh anthropologist (born 1930)

- Оразақ Смағұлұлы
- Born: 1 October 1930 (age 95); Mendykara District, Kostanay okrug, Kazakh ASSR, RSFSR, USSR
- Education: Al-Farabi Kazakh National University
- Known for: being one of the first and only Kazakh Anthropologists
- Children: Ainagül Ismagulovna
- Awards: Order of Parasat Order of Kurmet Medal "20 years of independence of the Republic of Kazakhstan"
- Scientific career
- Notable students: Ainagül Ismagulovna

Orazak Ismagulov (Kazakh: Оразақ Смағұлұлы, romanized: Orazaq Smağūlūly; born 1930) is the first and one of the only anthropologists of Kazakhstan (alongside his daughter Ainagül Ismagulovna), a doctor of historical sciences (1984), and a member of the Kazakhstan National Academy of Sciences (1994).

Ismagulov uses anthropological studies of ancient and modern people as a source of historical information for ethnogenesis and ethnic history of the Central Asia peoples. This work shed light on the origin of the Scythians, Sarmatians, Kangars, Alans, and other Central Asia peoples, following the anthropological development from the ancient to the modern times in the Central Asia.

== Biography ==
Orazak was born in the Mendykara District, Kostanay Region, Kazakh ASSR and graduated the Mendykara teacher school in 1950 and the historical faculty of the Al-Farabi National University in 1955. In the year 1956, worked as a teacher. Next year, worked in the Shoqan Walikhanov Institute of History and Ethnology (ru), while also being a trainee in an Almaty Medical Institute. In 1958 he worked at the Research Institute and Museum of Anthropology of the Moscow State University. In 1958–1961 a post-graduate student of the Institute of Ethnology and Anthropology of the Russian Academy of Sciences (scientific adviser G. F. Debets). Since 1965 a senior researcher. Between the years 1984 and 1986, Head of the Department of the Code of Historical Monuments of Kazakhstan and the New History of Kazakhstan, since 1989 is the Head of the Laboratory in the Kazakhstan Academy of Sciences.

From 1960, Ismagulov was a permanent participant and a head of anthropological expeditions in Kazakhstan and beyond: Indian-Soviet (1974–1975), Kazakh-Mongolian (1991–1993), Kazakh-Italian (1993–1994). In the 1993–1994, within the framework of scientific cooperation with the Institute of Anthropology at the Bolonia University in Italy, Ismagulov headed an international project for problems of adaptation of high-mountain Kazakhstan and Kyrgyzstan populations in respect to ethno-cultural processes in the region.

Ismagulov is the author of about 100 scientific works. Among them a special place takes a compendium of monographs for craniological series, genetic markers, and odontological attributes, compiled to establish a genetic continuity between ancient and modern populations of the Middle Asia, integrity of the historical process, study the Kazakh genetic fund, and the sources of its formation, and major historical phases of Kazakhstan local ancient populations and newcoming ethnic groups from Central Asia. Ismagulov is a frequent lecturer about anthropology in Delhi, California and Bolonia universities.

His only known child is his daughter Ainagül Ismagulova Orazaqqyzy, a person he often works and collaborates with when it comes to research and publishing. He mentioned her as his successor, saying that "our work combined equals a 100 years, we two did a job of a whole institute"

Under his scientific supervision 4 doctors and 3 candidates of sciences were trained. He credits Georgy Debets (rus), Yakov Roginskiy (rus) and Viktor Bunak (rus) as his tutors.

== Main scientific works ==
- Population of Kazakhstan from Bronze Epoch to present: (paleoanthropological research). Alma-Ata, 1970.
- Ethnic genetic geography of Kazakhstan: (serological research). Alma-Ata, 1977.
- Ethnic anthropology of Kazakhstan: (somatological research). Alma-Ata, 1982.
- Ethnic odontology of Kazakhstan. Alma-Ata, 1989. (co-author).
