= Kushmurun =

- Құсмұрын / Кушмурун
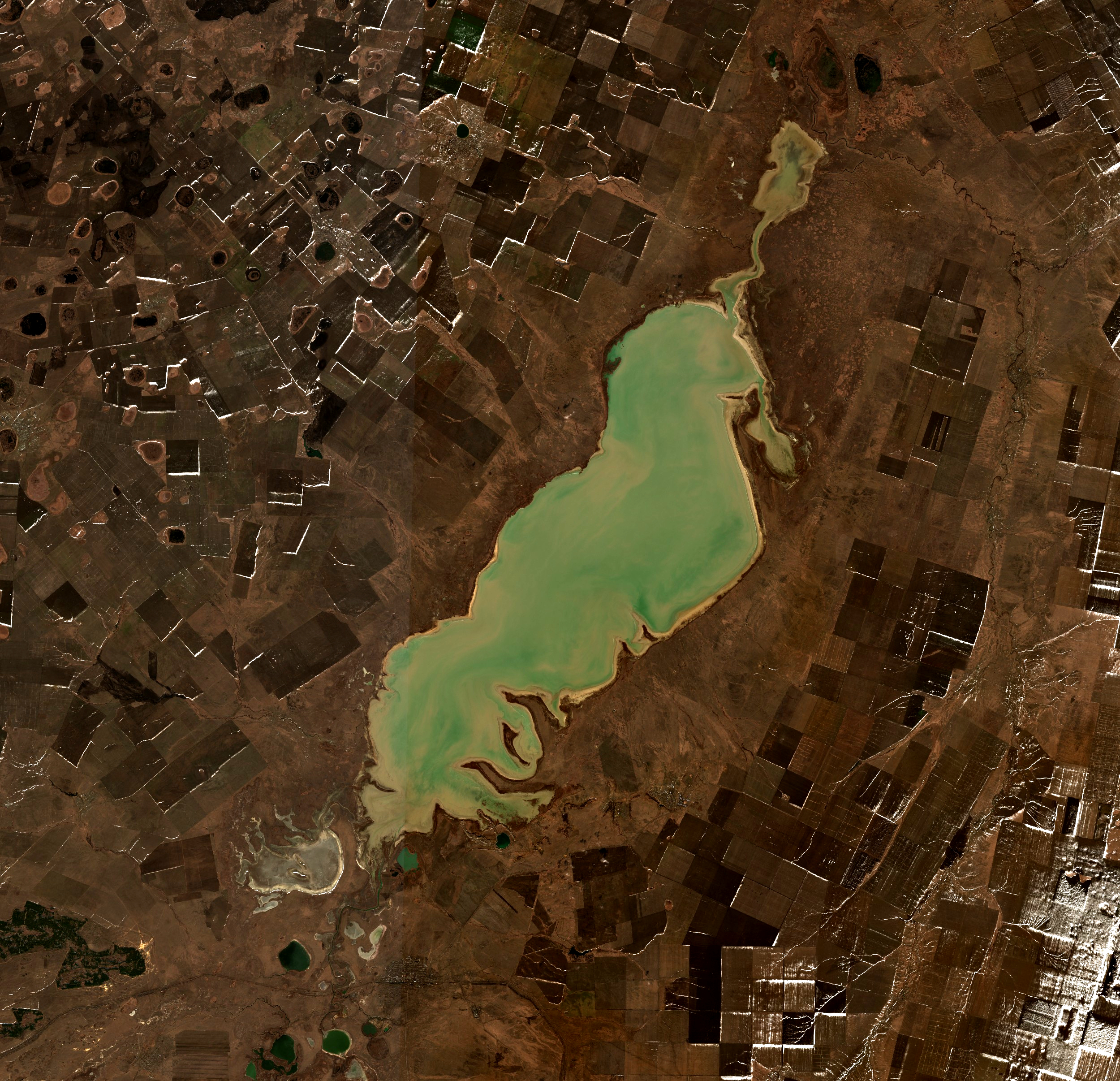
- Sentinel-2 image of the lake in 2020.

- Location within Kazakhstan
- Location: Turgay Basin
- Coordinates: 52°41′N 64°48′E
- Type: fluvial lake
- Primary inflows: Ubagan, Aschiba, Terekty and Shiyly
- Primary outflows: Ubagan
- Catchment area: 10,500 square kilometers (4,100 sq mi)
- Basin countries: Kazakhstan
- Max. length: 60 kilometers (37 mi)
- Max. width: 15 kilometers (9.3 mi)
- Surface area: 415 square kilometers (160 sq mi)
- Max. depth: 3.5 meters (11 ft)
- Surface elevation: 103 meters (338 ft)

Kushmurun (Kazakh: Құсмұрын; Russian: Кушмурун) is a brackish lake in the Kostanay Region, Kazakhstan.

Kushmurun is one of largest natural waterbodies of Kazakhstan. It lies in the northern sector of the Turgay Basin, at the border between Auliekol and Karasu districts, 9 kilometers (5.6 mi) north of the village of Kushmurun. The western side of the catchment area of the lake has been converted to agricultural land, affecting biodiversity.

== Geography ==
Kushmurun is an elongated fluvial lake located in the Turgay Basin. The lake stretches roughly from SSW to NNE and is crossed by the Ubagan river, a right tributary of the Tobol, from south to north. Kushmurun is fed by snow. To the southwest of Kushmurun rises the Amankaragai forested massif. The level of the lake is subject to variations according to the inflow, reaching a maximum area of 415 square kilometers (160 sq mi) in periods of high water and down to 210 square kilometers (81 sq mi) in periods of low water. The depth fluctuates between 1 meter (3 ft 3 in) and 3 meters (9.8 ft).

The bottom of Kushmurun is flat and has thick strata of clay and loam sediments covered with layers of silt. The banks are mostly gently-sloping or flat and swampy, but in the middle part of the lake they rise steeply up to between 5 meters (16 ft) and 7 meters (23 ft). The water has a greenish-yellow color. During the high water period in the spring it is fresh and suitable for drinking. But it becomes saline the rest of the year.

== Fauna ==
Kushmurun lake was a refuge for aquatic birds and waders that used to thrive in the formerly extensive reedbeds of the lakeshore. Nowadays, however, the reed cover has diminished to the point where almost all of the shoreline consists of muddy shoals. Among the fish species found in the waters of the lake, bream, perch and carp are worth mentioning.

== See also ==
- List of lakes of Kazakhstan
