= Karasu (village) =

Karasu Қарасу
- Village
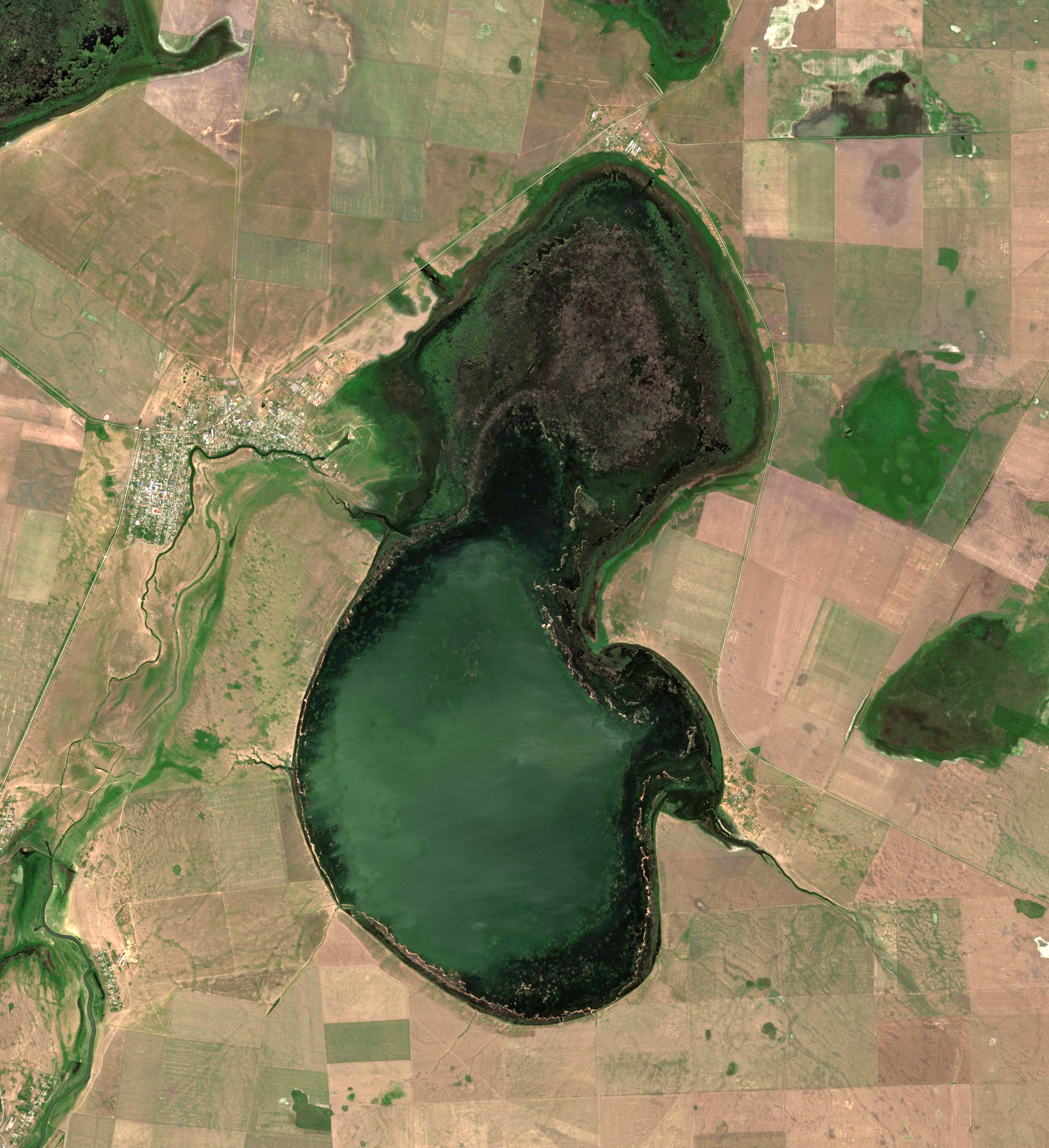
- Karasu by lake Koybagar

- Location in Kazakhstan
- Coordinates: 52°39′32″N 65°29′9″E
- Country: Kazakhstan
- Region: Kostanay Region
- District: Karasu District

Population (2019)
  - Total: 3,476
- Time zone: UTC+6 (East Kazakhstan Time)
- Post code: 030101

Karasu (Kazakh: Қарасу) is a village in the Kostanay Region, Kazakhstan. It is the administrative center and the only significant inhabited place of Karasu District (KATO code - 395230100). Population: 3,728 (2009 census results); 4,374 (1999 census results).

== Geography ==
The village is located 5 kilometers (3.1 mi) to the west of the northern shore of lake Koybagar, at a bend in river Karasu, which flows northwards, and then bends eastwards into the western shore of the lake.

=== Climate ===
Climate data for Karasu (1991–2020)
Month	Jan	Feb	Mar	Apr	May	Jun	Jul	Aug	Sep	Oct	Nov	Dec	Year
Mean daily maximum °C (°F)	−11.9 (10.6)	−10.6 (12.9)	−3.1 (26.4)	10.8 (51.4)	20.9 (69.6)	25.9 (78.6)	26.6 (79.9)	25.5 (77.9)	18.9 (66.0)	10.1 (50.2)	−2.3 (27.9)	−9.4 (15.1)	8.4 (47.1)
Daily mean °C (°F)	−16.0 (3.2)	−15.1 (4.8)	−7.7 (18.1)	4.8 (40.6)	13.9 (57.0)	19.1 (66.4)	20.3 (68.5)	18.6 (65.5)	12.0 (53.6)	4.3 (39.7)	−6.1 (21.0)	−13.4 (7.9)	2.9 (37.2)
Mean daily minimum °C (°F)	−20.2 (−4.4)	−19.4 (−2.9)	−12.1 (10.2)	−0.5 (31.1)	6.9 (44.4)	12.1 (53.8)	13.9 (57.0)	12.1 (53.8)	6.1 (43.0)	−0.5 (31.1)	−9.8 (14.4)	−17.4 (0.7)	−2.4 (27.7)
Average precipitation mm (inches)	13.1 (0.52)	14.5 (0.57)	18.5 (0.73)	22.1 (0.87)	32.7 (1.29)	35.6 (1.40)	46.7 (1.84)	35.5 (1.40)	24.2 (0.95)	24.0 (0.94)	19.7 (0.78)	17.1 (0.67)	303.7 (11.96)
Average precipitation days (≥ 1.0 mm)	4.1	4.2	4.4	4.3	6.0	5.2	7.0	6.1	4.8	5.8	5.2	4.9	62
Source: NOAA
