= Ubagan =

- Ubagan in the Tobol basin

Location
- Country: Kazakhstan, Russia

Physical characteristics
- Source
  - location: Karachinskoe/lake
- Mouth: Tobol
  - coordinates: 54°24′02″N 64°45′01″E
- Length: 376 km (234 mi)
- Basin size: 50,700 km^{2} (19,600 sq mi)

Basin features
- Progression: Tobol→ Irtysh→ Ob→ Kara Sea

The Ubagan (Kazakh: Обаған Obağan; Russian: Убаган) is a river of Kazakhstan and Russia, a right tributary of the Tobol. It has a length of 376 km (234 mi), and a catchment area of 50,700 km^{2} (19,600 sq mi), with water supplied by melting snow. In the summer the water is brackish.

== Course ==
The river originates in lake Karachinsky and flows northwards along the Turgay Depression. In the upper reaches it flows through lake Kushmurun. The river empties into the right bank of the Tobol 909 km (565 mi) from its mouth.

== History ==
About Abagana present article in ASBE:

Ubagan river Akmola and Turgay regions (Obagi) is a right tributary of the Tobol river; originates in the southern slopes of the mountains Kosharovsky in Akmola region and in the upper reaches bears the title Burduli-Tal. Reaching Turgay area, Ubagan flows directly to the North, serving as a border between the Turgai and Akmolinsk regions about 200 miles, and in this way passes through a large lake Ubagan. Then, a short 60 miles to the Northern edge of the region, the river is deflected to the West and flows into the Tobol already from Orenburg province, 10 versts from the village of Zverinogolovskoe. Abagana width in some places reaches 20 fathoms; convenient fords is not a lot, the best of them Kara-Utkul (black Ford) Baggalini on the caravan route, near the confluence of the brook, Asibus. Tributaries, noteworthy, Ubagan is not. Water all over Abagana salt or bitter-salt.
