= Karasu District =

Coordinates: 52°19′12″N 65°22′12″E

Karasu
- District
- Қарасу ауданы
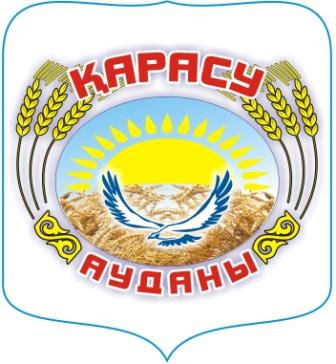
- Seal

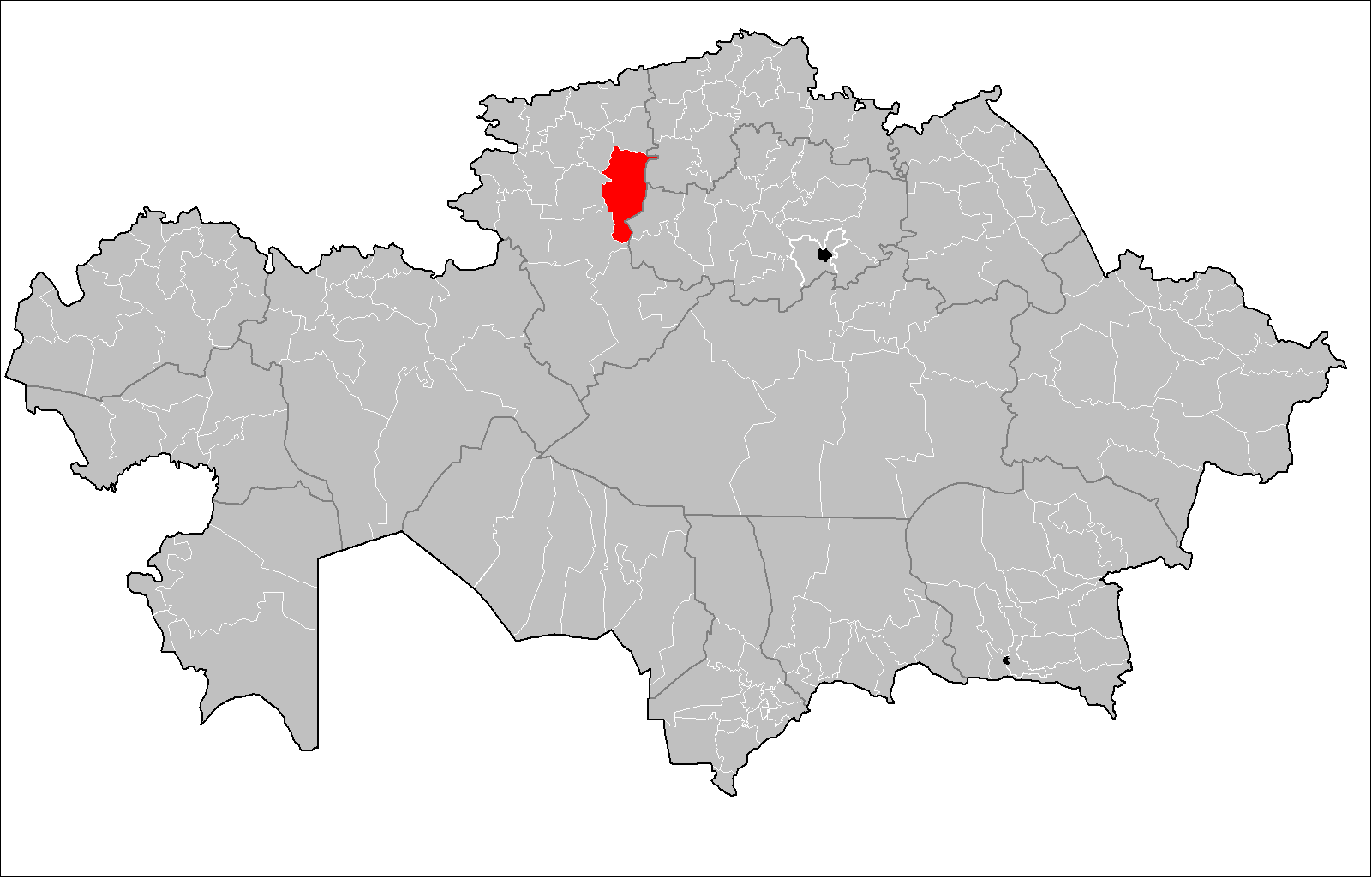
- Country: Kazakhstan
- Region: Kostanay Region
- Administrative center: Karasu

Government
  - Akim: Radchenko Viktor Nikolaevich

Population (2013)
  - Total: 27,879
- Time zone: UTC+6 (East)

Karasu (Kazakh: Қарасу ауданы, Qarasu audany) is a district of Kostanay Region in northern Kazakhstan. The administrative center of the district is the selo of Karasu. Population: 27,879 (2013 estimate); 29,238 (2009 census results); 37,360 (1999 census results).

== Geography ==
The Ulken Damdi river, as well as lake Kushmurun, are located in the district, the latter at the border with neighboring Auliekol District.

== Education ==
The network of educational institutions in Karasu District consists of 32 educational organizations, including:

- 1 district education department
- 24 schools
- 5 kindergartens
- 2 supplementary education institutions
