= Borovskoy, Kazakhstan =

Borovskoy Боровской
- Village
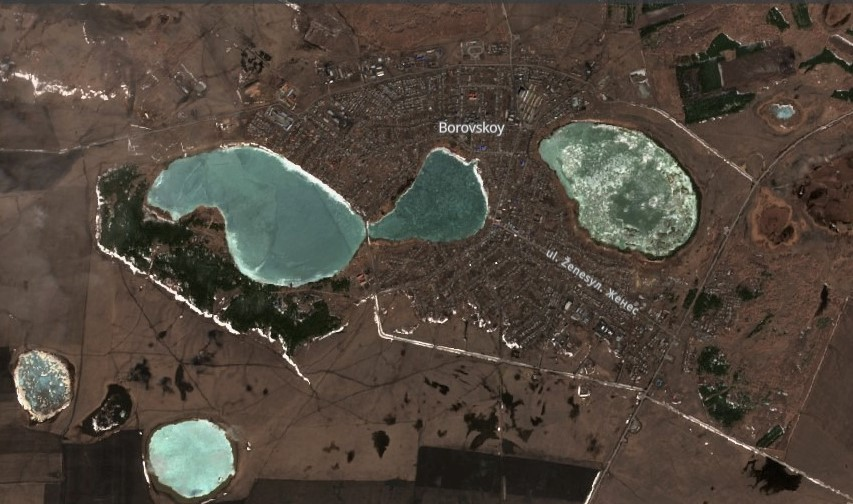
- Borovskoy village Sentinel-2 image

- Location in Kazakhstan
- Coordinates: 53°47′47″N 64°11′22″E
- Country: Kazakhstan
- Region: Kostanay Region
- District: Mendykara District
- Founded: 1881

Population (2015)
  - Total: 9,434
- Time zone: UTC+6 (East Kazakhstan Time)
- Post code: 111300, 111301

Borovskoy (Kazakh: Боровской) is a village in the Kostanay Region, Kazakhstan. It is the administrative center of Mendykara District and of the Borovskoy Rural District (KATO code - 395630100). Population: 9,781 (2009 census results); 10,025 (1999 census results).

== Geography ==
The village is located by lake Borovskoy, 90 kilometers (56 mi) to the southeast of Kostanay city, the regional capital. The Kazakhstan–Russia border lies about 60 kilometers (37 mi) to the north.
