= Amangeldi =

Amangeldi Амангелді
- Village
- Location in Kazakhstan
- Coordinates: 50°10′52″N 65°11′19″E
- Country: Kazakhstan
- Region: Kostanay Region
- District: Amangeldi District
- Elevation: 449 ft (137 m)

Population (2009)
  - Total: 7,569
- Time zone: UTC+05:00 (Kazakhstan Time)
- Postal code: 110200

Amangeldi (Kazakh: Амангелді, Amangeldı) is a village and the administrative center of Amangeldi District in Kostanay Region of north-western Kazakhstan. The population is 7,569 (2009 census results).
