= Mendykara District =

Coordinates: 53°48′36″N 64°09′00″E

Mendiqara
- District
- Меңдіқара ауданы
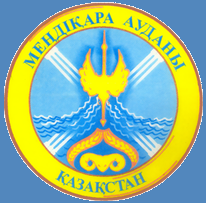
- Seal

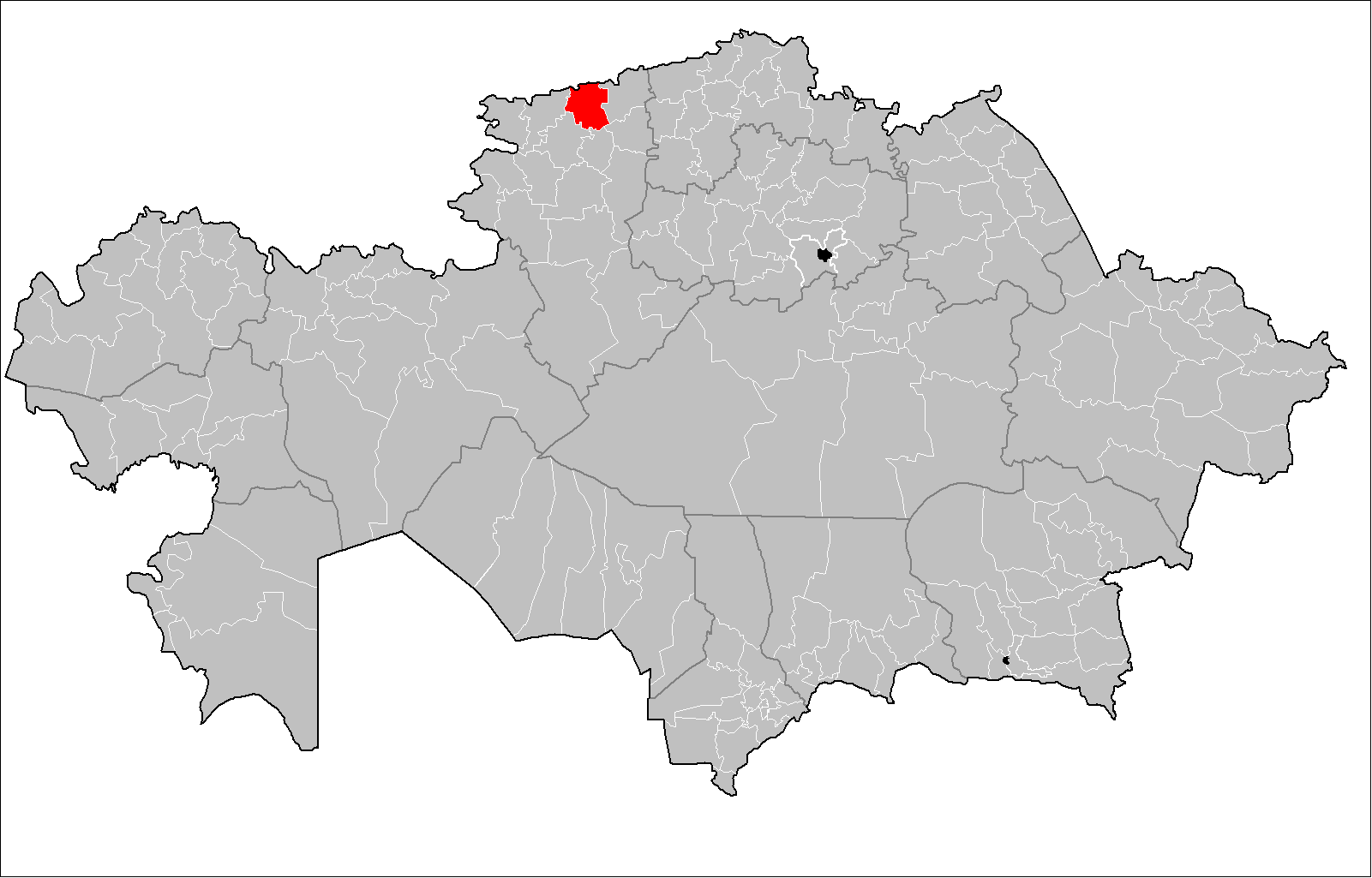
- Country: Kazakhstan
- Region: Kostanay Region
- Administrative center: Borovskoy

Government
  - Akim: Gabit Bekbayev

Population (2013)
  - Total: 30,490
- Time zone: UTC+6 (East)

Mendiqara (Kazakh: Меңдіқара ауданы, Meñdıqara audany) is a district of Kostanay Region in northern Kazakhstan. The administrative center of the district is the selo of Borovskoy. Population: 30,490 (2013 estimate); 32,016 (2009 census results); 39,632 (1999 census results).
