= Amangeldi District =

Coordinates: 49°52′12″N 65°19′12″E

Amangeldi
- District
- Аманкелді ауданы
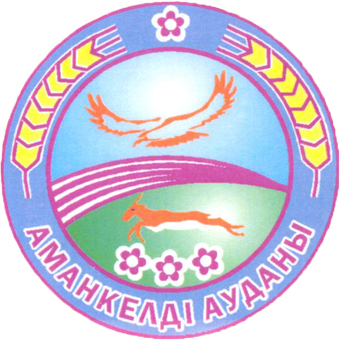
- Seal

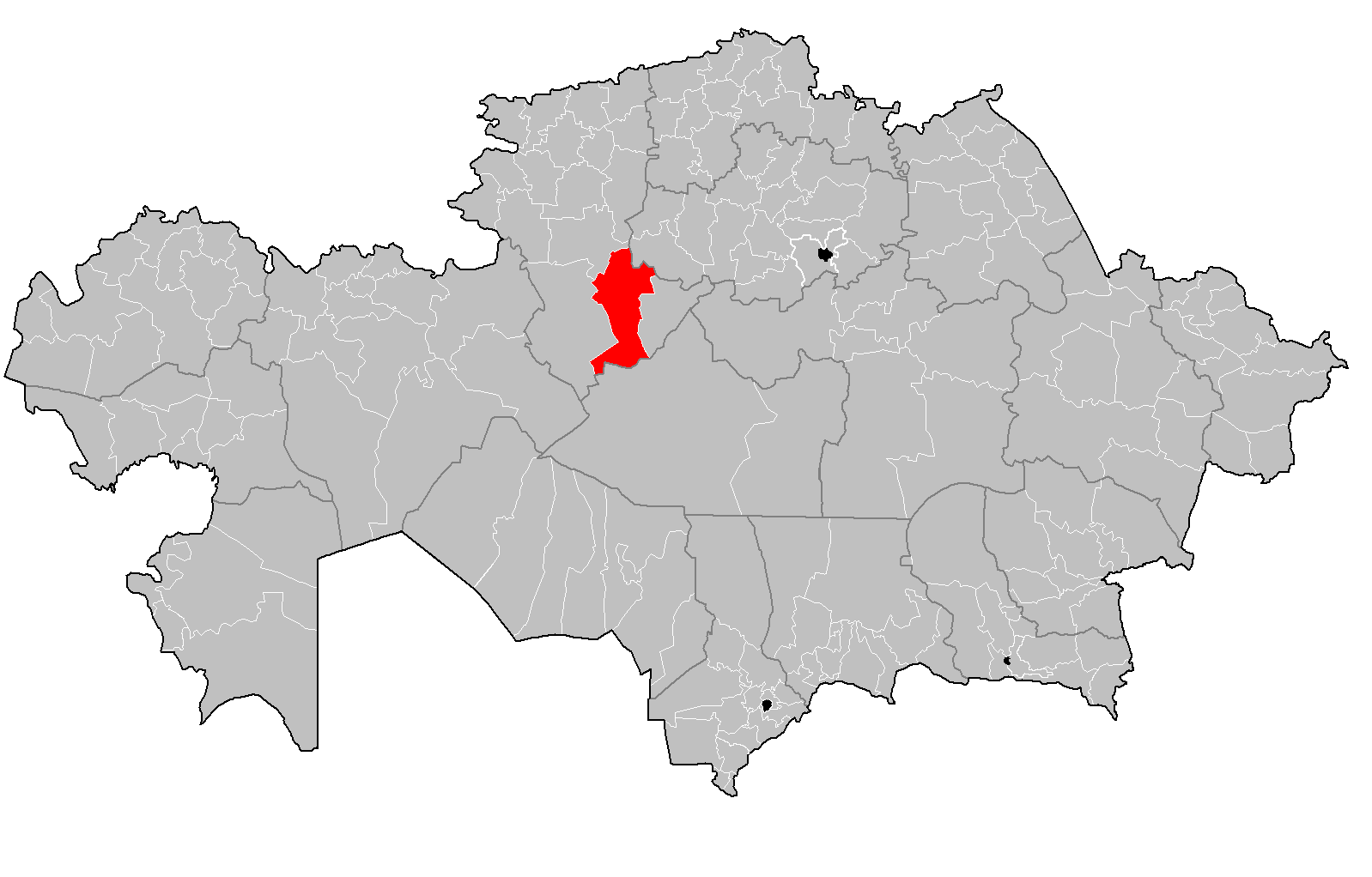
- Country: Kazakhstan
- Region: Kostanay Region
- Administrative center: Amangeldi

Government
  - Akim: Kedelbaev Kanat Uashovich

Population (2013)
  - Total: 17,222
- Time zone: UTC+5 (East)

Amangeldi (Kazakh: Аманкелді ауданы, Amankeldı audany) is a district of Kostanay Region in northern Kazakhstan. Named after Amankeldı İmanov, a famous revolutionary leader who headed the Central Asian revolt of 1916 against Tsarist Russia. The administrative center of the district is Amangeldi. Population: 17,222 (2013 estimate); 17,660 (2009 census results); 21,244 (1999 census results).

== Geography ==
Lakes Katpagan, Olzhakol, Zhaltyrsor and Kishi Katpagan are located in the district. There are also numerous smaller salt lakes.
