= Turgay Depression =

Plain in Kazakhstan

Turgay Depression Торғай қолаты Тургайская ложбина
- Depression
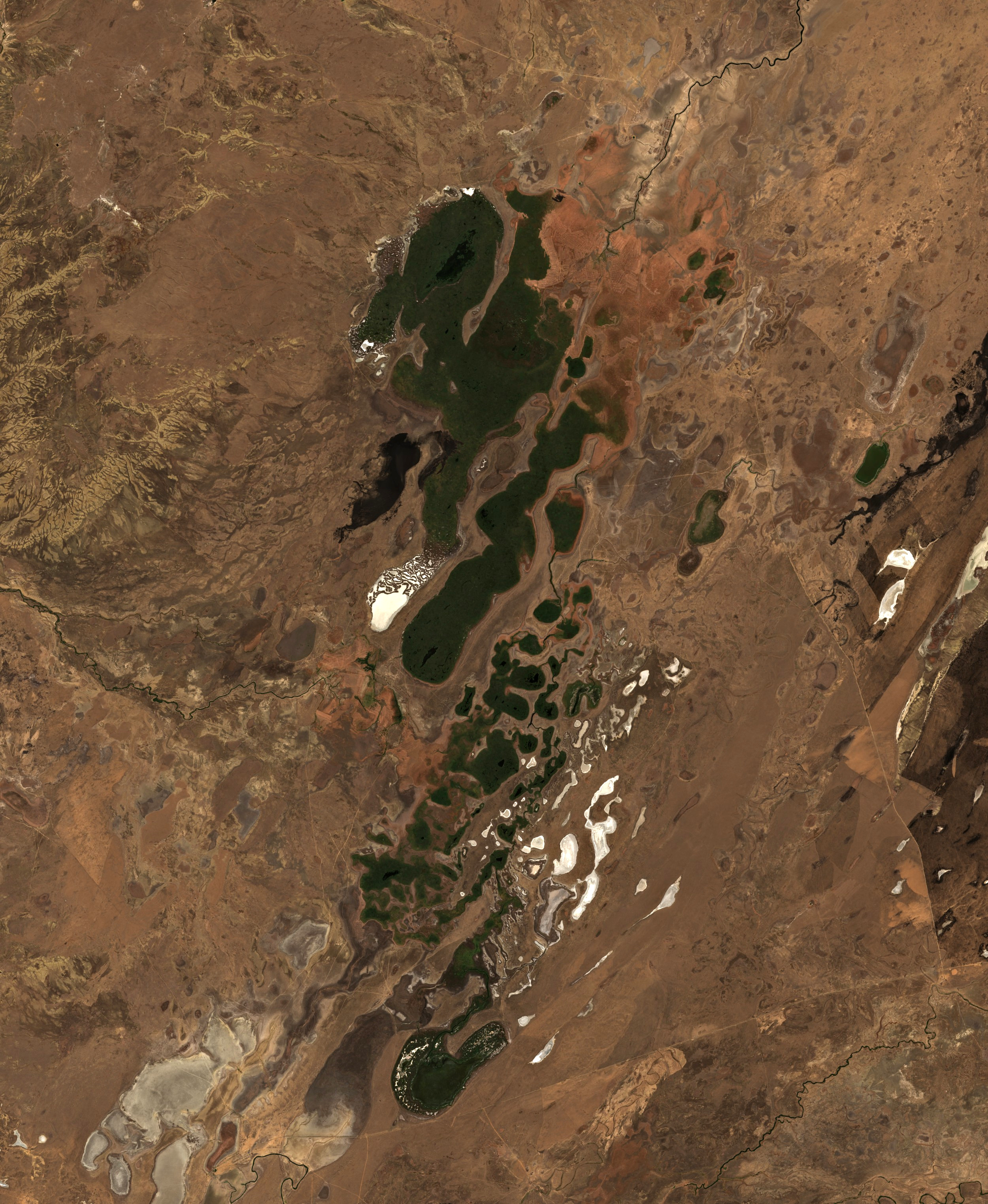
- Sarykopa, one of the main lakes of the basin

- Location within Kazakhstan
- Coordinates: 52°40′N 64°45′E
- Location: Kazakhstan
- Part of: Aktobe Region, Kostanay Region

Dimensions
  - Length: 800 km (500 mi)
  - Width: 25 km (16 mi) to 300 km (190 mi)
- Elevation: 100 m (330 ft) to 125 m (410 ft)

The Turgay Depression, also known as Turgay Basin, Turgay Trough, and Turgay Hollow (Kazakh: Торғай қолаты; Russian: Тургайская ложбина), is a structural basin in Kazakhstan.

The depression is named after the Turgay River, which flows southwards along a stretch of the trough. The Lakes of the lower Turgay and Irgiz Nature Reserve is a protected area located in the southern sector of the basin.

== Geography ==
The Turgay Depression runs across the Turgay Plateau in north-western Kazakhstan. It stretches from north to south and connects the West Siberian Plain to the north with the Turan Depression. It has a length of 800 km (500 mi) and an average width between 25 km (16 mi) and 75 km (47 mi) with a maximum of 300 km (190 mi). The Ubagan River, a right tributary of the Tobol flows along it in the northern direction. Among the rivers flowing southwards, the main ones are the Turgay with its tributaries Irgiz and Ulkayak, including the Saryozen through the Tauysh channel, as well as the Uly-Zhylanshyk. The lowest parts of the depression are occupied by numerous lakes, with mostly saline or bittern-salty waters, such as Kushmurun, Koybagar, Tyuntyugur, Aksuat, Teniz, Sarymoin, Sarykopa, Akkol, Barakkol and Shalkarteniz.

Geologically the entire trough corresponds to the Turgai tectonic subsidence of ancient alluvial and lacustrine deposits. The Turgay Plateau rises between the Urals and Mugodzhar Hills in the west and the Kazakh Steppe in the east. Deposits of iron ore and other minerals occur in the basin, as well as significant oilfields in the southern part.

The northern part of the basin is characterized by steppe and the southern part by semi-desert, with the Barsuki Desert at the southern end near the Aral Sea. In the spring and summer, large swathes of it are used for pasture.

== See also ==
- Geology of Kazakhstan
- Kazakh Steppe
- Outline of plate tectonics
