= Music of Kazakhstan =

Music of Kazakhstan refers to a wide range of musical styles and genres deriving from Kazakhstan. Kazakhstan is home to the Kazakh State Kurmangazy Orchestra of Folk Instruments, the Kazakh State Philharmonic Orchestra, the Kazakh National Opera and the Kazakh State Chamber Orchestra. The folk instrument orchestra was named after Kurmangazy Sagyrbayuly, a well-known composer and dombra player from the 19th century.

== Traditional music ==
Traditional music in Kazakhstan often refers to music of the following genres:

- Instrumental music, with the pieces ("Küy") being performed by soloists. Text is often seen in the background (or "program") for the music, as a lot of Küy titles refer to stories.
- Vocal music, either as part of a ceremony such as a wedding (mainly performed by women), or as part of a feast. Here we might divide into subgenres: epic singing, containing not only historical facts, but as well the tribe's genealogy, love songs, didactic verses; and as a special form the composition of two or more singers in public (Aitys), of dialogue character and usually unexpectedly frankly in content.

=== Traditional musical instruments ===
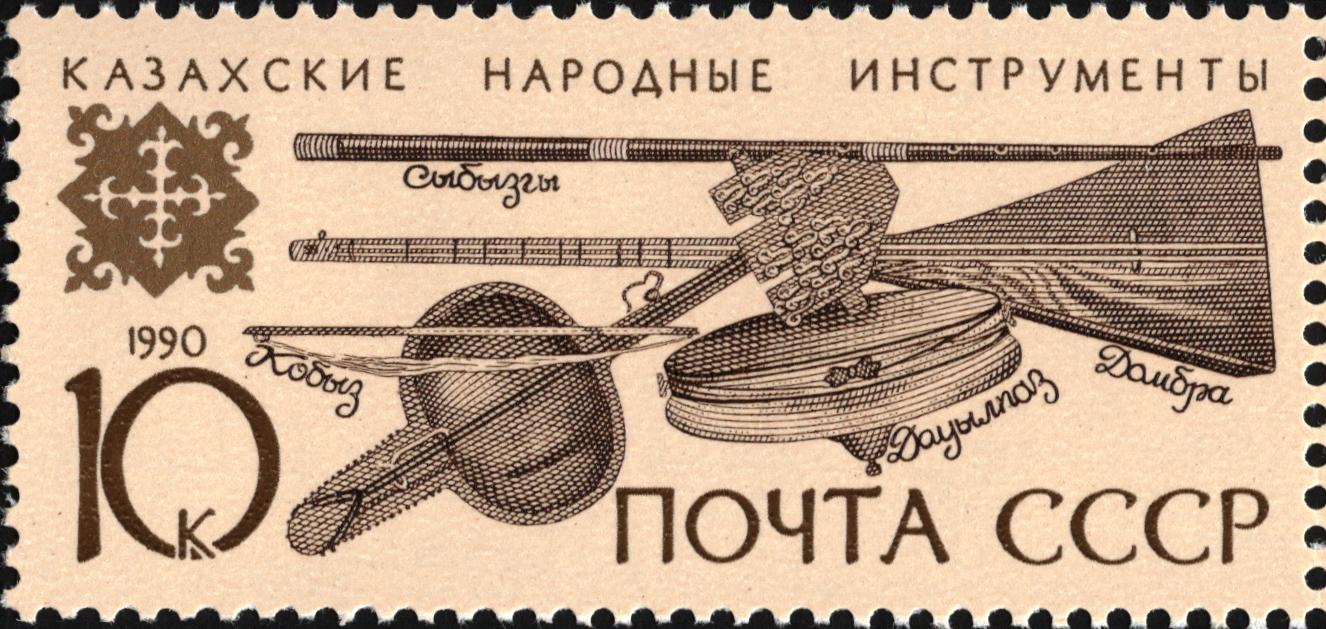
Traditional instruments of Kazakhstan

The most popular traditional instruments are string instruments. First of them is the dombra (домбыра), the most popular and the oldest Kazakh music instrument. Some argue that nomads have used similar two-string instruments more than two thousand years ago. The dombra is a long-necked lute with two strings tuned in the interval of a fourth or sometimes a fifth. The strings are plucked or strummed by the right hand without a plectrum.

The other instrument playing an important role is the Qobyz, which is a bowed instrument held between the legs. It is made of carved wood for the body, animal skin for the resonator, and horse hair for the strings, and the bow. The Qobyz is said to have been invented by the legendary shaman Qorqyt, long before the medieval ages. The "Zhetigen" ("Seven strings") could be seen as a member of the cither family, finding equivalents in China, with the strings being divided each in two parts of different lengths, the bridge being movable and consisting of small bone. There is also a plucked lute called sherter (шертер).

- Dombra (Kazakh: домбыра) is a stringed instrument of the Turkic, which is widely spread among the Turks. Dombra is made of hollow wood, wooden parts and two strings. 19 (sometimes 22) keys are attached to the neck. Has variation as three-stringed dombra, double-sided, wide-body, hollow-necked, etc.
- Kobyz (khylkobyz (Kazkah: қобыз)) is a stringed-bowed instrument. Kobyz has a bucket-shaped body, an arcuate curved neck and a large flat head. The half of surface is covered with skin. Strings and bow are made of horse hair. It is made of solid wooden block. Often done with two strings, but also there are three-stringed, four-stringed kobyz and has variations like "nar kobyz", "jez kobyz".
- Jew's harp (shankobyz (Kazakh: шаңқобыз)) is an ancient musical instrument of the Kazakh people that is made of silver or iron. It is not so big, with a body and arcuate tongue. The way you play on this instrument is directly related to the interaction with the oral cavity. When playing the instrument, use the right hand to pull the instrument by the tongue. In ancient times, the shankobyz was a child's and a woman's instrument. Shankobyz has many names in different nations: vargan, temir komuz, komys, aure, komus, vaniar, tumra, kousian, etc.
- Sherter (Kazakh: шертер) is a stringed instrument. It is played like dombyra, but the bone is less than dombyra and it looks like a kobyz. It is made of wood, but the exterior is covered with skin. It is mostly played by shepherds, and often used for accompaniment of fables.
- Jetigen (Kazakh: жетіген) is a polychord instrument. The form of instrument is oblong, with the shape of a box. 13 (or it can be 7) strings are attached to both ends of the box and there are special wooden parts on each string. All of the Turkic cultures have jetigen, but have different names of it: Tatars "etigan", Tyvalks "shatkan", etc.
- Dauylpaz (Kazakh: дауылпаз) is a percussion instrument which was a military instrument. In ancient times, it lifted the spirit of warriors and hunters. In structure it resembles an ordinary drum. The manufacturing process is very complicated: you need to make groove in wood, cover the top with skin, make a belt to carry it everywhere and a stick to beat it.
- Kongyrau (Kazakh: қоңырау) is a musical instrument that is made of gold or silver. The structure is close to the bell. Bells of different sizes are distributed on a wooden base and, when stressed, produces an enjoyable ringing. Some artists attach the kongyrau to the top of their instrument while playing.
- Zhelbuaz (Kazakh: желбуаз)
- Asatayak (Kazakh: асатаяқ)

Traditional Kazakh instruments are often used in contemporary music and play a big role in Kazakh music. Traditional orchestras include "Otryrar Sazy", "Kurmangazy Orchestra", "Al-Faraby sazy", and a number of others. Kazakh instruments are used not only by artists but also are an integral part of the life of almost every Kazakh.

== Russian and Soviet-era music ==
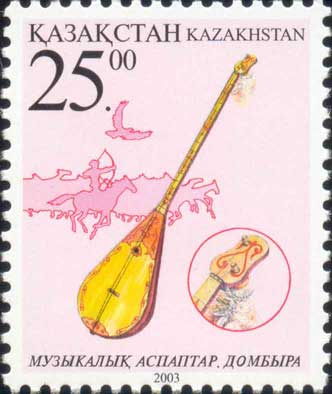
Postage stamp depicting a dombra, the most popular traditional musical instrument of Kazakhstan

The Russian influence on the music life in Kazakhstan can be seen in two spheres:

- First, the introduction of musical academic institutions such as concert houses with opera stages, conservatories (where European music was performed and taught).
- Second, by trying to incorporate Kazakh traditional music into these academic structures.

Controlled by the Russian Empire and then the Soviet Union, Kazakhstan's folk and classical traditions became connected with ethnic Russian music and Western European music. Prior to the 20th century, Kazakh folk music was collected and studied by ethnographic research teams including composers, music critics and musicologists. In the first part of the 19th century, Kazakh music was transcribed in linear notation. Some composers of this era set Kazakh folk songs to Russian-style European classical music.

Kazakh musicians themselves, however, did not write their own music with notation until 1931. Later, as part of the Soviet Union, certain Kazakh folk culture was encouraged to avoid political and social unrest. The result was a derivative of Kazakh folk music. In 1920, Aleksandr Zatayevich, a Russian official, created major works of art music with melodies and other elements from Kazakh folk music. Beginning in 1928 and accelerating in the 1930s, he also adapted traditional Kazakh instruments for use in Russian-style ensembles (such as increasing the number of frets and strings). Soon, these styles of modern orchestral playing became the only way for musicians to officially play; Kazakh folk was turned into patriotic, professional and socialist endeavors. In their work, many artists of the early 90's turn to folk music, processing of folk works and songs in the Kazakh language. Thus, the group URKER, appearing on the music scene in 1994, was one of the first to raise the topic of patriotism and the revival of cultural values in their work.

One of the breakthrough musical projects of the 90s was the first international music festival "Asia Dauysy". Having appeared in 1990, the festival was held annually at the Medeo venue, bringing together artists from around the world on its stage. The festival became the starting point in the musical career for many Kazakhstani musicians, such as Nurlan Abdullin and Bauyrzhan Isayev.

In the modern world, the baton of "Asia Dauysy" was picked up by the music festival "A Star of Asia", which is traditionally held at the Medeo venue since 2017.

An equally popular musical project that appeared in the 90s is the annual competition of young performers "Zhas Kanat". Both solo performers and ensembles took part in the competition, and the project itself opened a new generation of singers for the Kazakh stage, such as Zhanna Sattarova, the group "Ayan" and Madina Sadvakasova.

== Musical institutions ==
The Musical-Dramatic Training College, founded in 1931, was the first institute of higher education for music in Kazakhstan. Two years later, the Orchestra of Kazakh Folk Musical Instruments was formed The Foundation Asyl Mura is archives and publishes historical recordings of Kazakh music both traditional and classical. The Qurmanghazy Conservatoire is considered one of the leading conservatoires in Almaty.

== Contemporary genres ==
=== Kazakh hip hop ===
The Kazakh hip hop and rap scene started to emerge in the country after the Dissolution of the Soviet Union. Hip-hop easily flourished in Kazakhstan due to the use of Russian in its songs, which makes it easier for Kazakh rappers to achieve popularity in other Russian-speaking countries. Kazakh groups such as Tristar began to be featured on MTV Russia. Hip-hop is arguably the most popular contemporary music genre in Kazakhstan, especially among the youth. In 2013, American rapper Kanye West was privately invited by President Nursultan Nazarbayev to perform at his grandson's wedding.

==== Rap culture ====
In 1995-1999, the Rap Zone group appeared on the music scene, which was the first among many to instill the love of young people for domestic rap music. The band members recorded their albums on cassettes.

Especially breakthrough was their track "Noise-boom-boom-Coup", which became the anthem of young people, and RAP ZONE inscriptions were emblazoned on yard fences, houses and in school diaries.

The popularization of rap in Kazakhstan reached its peak in the 2010s and 2020s. It is apparent that current rappers are inspired by Western artists, looking for references in world and national culture, leading to rap in Kazakhstan now being quite distinctive and unique. The genre is often in the greatest demand among younger people, leading to a increase in cultural significance. Some of the most popular artists at the moment are Scriptonite, Hiro, V$XV Prince, and De Lacure.

==== R'n'b ====
In addition to traditional pop music, hip-hop and r'n'b developed rapidly in Kazakhstan, which found a response in the work of such groups as Ghetto Dogs, Metis's, Not Everything Is Said and the group 101 led by Ivan Breusov.

Later on in the 2010s, Kazakh hip-hop would influence the development of the Q-pop music genre. Well-known Kazakh rappers are Jah Khalib, Natan, and Scriptonite.

=== Kazakh rock ===
Kazakh rock is a form of rock music in Kazakhstan, with lyrics written and performed both in Kazakh and Russian. Rock music has been popular in Kazakhstan, especially in Karaganda Region, since the 1960s, when it was popularized by The Beatles. During the Soviet era, Kazakhstan was exposed to both American and Russian rock. Local punk rock was started in Almaty in the late eighties by such bands as The Moloty, Subway and Po-1. Well-known Kazakh rock bands are Adaptatsiya, Ulytau, and Urker.

=== Q-pop ===
Q-pop or Qazaq pop is a comparatively new musical genre of Kazakhstan. The term was coined in 2015. Q-pop originates from K-Pop, hip-hop, Western pop and J-Pop respectively. Kazakhstani entertainment company Juz Entertainment has been credited as the pioneer of the genre, with its boy group Ninety One debuting in 2015. Artists like Ziruza, Mad Men, DNA, Alba and CrystalZ also contribute to the genre.

The prize-winning Kazakh singer Dimash Kudaibergen mixes pop with elements of classical music and traditional Kazakh folk music. In September 2022, Dimash caused a furor on Twitter after singing the Kazakh anthem before Gennady Golovkin's boxing bout against Canelo Alvarez.

Kazakh singer Rukhiya Baydukenova specializes in pop vocals. She was the Grand Prix winner of the 2021 Slavianski Bazaar in Vitebsk International Festival of Arts, also known as the Slavic Bazaar.

=== Toi ===
Toi (Той; literally means public gathering) refers to easy-listening folk music with catchy rhythm, usually performed in weddings and festives. This genre is also popular in Uzbekistan, Turkmenistan and Kyrgyzstan. Well-known Kazakh toi singers are Qairat Nurtas, Abdijappar Alqoja, Madina Saduakasova and Jazira Baiyrbekova.
