= Ulytau =

Ulytau (Kazakh: Ұлытау) may refer to:

- Ulytau Region, a region in Kazakhstan
- Ulytau District, Ulytau Region, Kazakhstan
- Ulytau (village), administrative center of Ulytau District, Kazakhstan
- Ulytau (range), a mountain range, Kazakh Uplands
- Ulytau (music group), a folk metal trio from Kazakhstan
- FC Ulytau, a football team based in Zhezkazgan, Kazakhstan
