= Jumyr-Kylysh =

Studio album by Ulytau
- Released: 2006
- Studio: Vladmir Osinsky Studios
- Genre: Folk metal
- Length: 40:00
- Label: ABK Records
- Producer: Tim Palmer, Maxim Kichgin

Jumyr-Kylysh is the debut (and thus far, only) studio release from the all-instrumental Turkic/Kazakh folkband Ulytau, which hails from the Ulytau District in Kazakhstan. The album features modern, metal-based interpretations and arrangements of pieces by composers such as Vivaldi, Bach and Mozart, but keeps the emphasis on the Kazakh folk tradition; to that end, there are also arrangements of pieces from composers such as Makhambet Utemisov and Qurmangazy Sagyrbaiuly.

== Track listing ==
1. "Adai" (Qurmangazy Sagyrbaiuly) 3:12
2. "Winter (Four Seasons)" (Vivaldi) 3:56
3. "Kurishiler" (I. Iskakov) 3:29
4. "Jumyr-Kylysh" (Makhambet Utemisov) 5:04
5. "Toccata and Fugue" (Bach) 4:15
6. "Ata Tolaguy" (Nurgisa Tilendiev) 4:11
7. "Turkish March" (Mozart) 4:11
8. "Yapyr-Ai" (Kazakh traditional folk song) 3:49
9. "Teriskapai" (Shalmyrza) 4:03
10. "Kokil" (Kazangap Tlepbergenovich) 3:36
- Note: The liner notes contain a/an "Project Author"; this person goes by the name of Kydyrali Bolmanod.

== Personnel ==
- Maxim Kilchigin: Electric Guitar
- Erjan Alimbetov: Dombra
- Roman Adonin: Keyboards
- Evgeny Sizov: Bass
- Nurgaisha Sadvakasova: Violin
- Igor Djavad-Zade: Drums

== Production ==
- Arranged and Directed by Tabriz Shakhidi
- Produced by Tim Palmer and Maxim Kilchigin
- Recorded by Slava Motliev at Vladimir Osinsky Studios
- Mixed by Tim Palmer at Paramount Recording Studios
- Mastered by Leonid Vorobiev at Vladimir Osinsky Studios
