= Q-pop =

Music genre from Kazakhstan

- Stylistic origins: Hip hop; EDM; R&B; Toi-pop; K-pop
- Cultural origins: 2015, Kazakhstan

Fusion genres
- Toi-pop

Q-pop or Qazaq pop is a music genre originating in Kazakhstan. It is a modern form of Kazakhstani pop music sung in Kazakh, incorporating elements of Western pop music, Kazakhstani hip hop, EDM, R&B and Toi-pop, with heavy influences from K-pop of South Korea. The genre first surfaced in 2015 when the first Q-pop group, Ninety One debuted. Since then the genre has experienced growing popularity among Kazakhstani youths, with more Q-pop artists forming and debuting.

== Background ==
Kazakhstan experienced the Korean Wave when South Korean dramas and movies started entering the country in the mid 2000s. This phenomenon, assisted by the increasing accessibility of the internet, sparked more interest in South Korean pop culture among Kazakhstanis, which helped the popularization of the K-pop music genre in Kazakhstan. K-pop is regarded as an attractive, less-restrictive and unique genre. The high popularity of K-pop in Kazakhstan spurred the creation of the first Q-pop project in 2014, when JUZ Entertainment formed Ninety One. After the group debuted in 2015, it became instantly popular among youth, due to its high quality music and the use of Kazakh in its songs.

== Current status ==
Q-pop is enjoying support from both the government and the people as a means to promote and popularize the use of Kazakh language and Latin script among youth. However, it has also faced criticism and rejection from the traditionalist element of society, especially toward its performers' on-stage appearance. Since 2018, there has been an annual q-pop music festival called the Q-Fest, usually held during Autumn in Almaty.

== List of Q-pop performers ==
=== Boy bands ===
- 10iz (disbanded)
- ALPHA
- DNA (disbanded)
- Moonlight
- Madmen (disbanded)
- Ninety One
- Sevenlight (disbanded in 2020)
- Newton (disbanded)
- Alien
- Black Dial (disbanded)
- Divine (disbanded)
- Qarapaiym (disbanded)
- Alpha
- BlackJack
- Warno

=== Girl groups ===
- 404
- Ayanat (disbanded)
- Crystalz (disbanded)
- Ice Blue
- IMZ1
- iONE!
- Juzim (disbanded)
- KeshYOU
- Oasis
- Ozge (disbanded)
- Qiyal (disbanded)
- T'OI
- UMAY

=== Co-ed groups ===
- Youngsters

=== Musical duos ===
- The Egiz
- Bope & Roo
- Buira (disbanded)
- EQ (band)

=== Male soloists ===
- ASHAD (ex AJ)
- Arsenaleen
- AZ (ex Ninety One)
- Bala (Ninety One)
- Kyle Ruh (ex ML)
- Madi Rymbaev
- Qog
- Sadraddin
- ZaQ (Ninety One)

=== Female soloists ===
- Alba
- Aroojeanne
- Ayau
- Ayree
- Bayansulu
- C.C.TAY
- Daricorn
- Diuoou
- Hey Monro
- Hulan-Aru
- Malika Yes
- Polina Max
- Yenlik
- Ziruza

=== Crossover artists ===
These artists also sing in genres besides Q-pop such as Toi, Hip-Hop & R&B

- Aidana Medenova
- Ali Oqapov
- Beibit Koshqaliev
- Daneliya Tuleshova
- Dimash Kudaibergen
- Erke Esmahan
- Kamshat Joldybaeva
- Nurbolat Abdullin
- Qyandyq Rahym

== List of Q-pop record labels and management agencies ==
- C.C.Team Entertainment
- Dara Entertainment
- JUZ Entertainment
- D&D Production
- MM Entertainment
- Lion Pride Entertainment
- Trend Entertainment
- Musan Entertainment
