= Miras Zhugunussov =

Musical artist from Kazakhstan

Miras Zhugunussov Мирас Жүгінісов
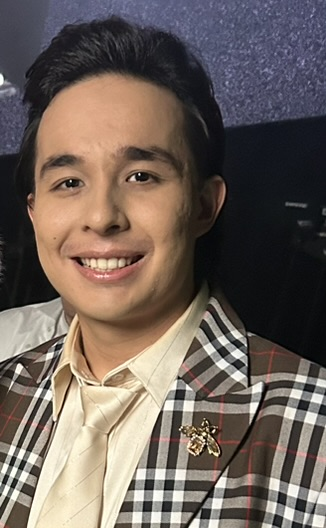
- Miras at the Congress Center in Astana on May 19, 2024.

Background information
- Born: 20 January 2000 (age 26); Aksaï, Kazakhstan
- Genres: Pop; Contemporary Kazakh
- Occupation: Singer
- Instruments: Vocals; guitar
- Years active: 2008–present

Miras Zhugunussov (Kazakh: Мирас Жүгінісов, also spelled Мирас Жугунусов, born January 20, 2000) is a Kazakh pop singer. He has been cited among the artists contributing to the renewed popularity of Kazakh-language contemporary music.

== Early life ==
Miras Zhugunussov was born in Aksaï, near Oral, in western Kazakhstan, and grew up in Astana in an artistic family before moving to Almaty.

His mother is an actress at the K. Kuanyshbayev Kazakh Musical and Drama Theater, and his father is a choreographer and producer. He is the brother of Rustem (finalist in Season 3 of The X Factor, Kazakhstan) and Muhammedali Zhugunussov.

Zhugunussov was passionate about sports. As a child, he practiced football, karate, basketball, and chess, but gave up sports on medical advice. In his childhood, he said that he would never become a singer.

== Career ==
Zhugunussov began performing on stage at the age of eight alongside his brothers Rustem and Muhammedali as part of the family trio, the Zhugunussov Brothers.

In 2018, he represented Kazakhstan at the Silk Road Star competition in Georgia. The following year he was awarded in the estrada (variety music) category at the Elorda Jastary Syilygy (“Youth of the Capital Awards”), an event that recognizes young talents and professionals in Astana.

Starting in 2020, he gained wider recognition and performed at numerous festivals, including Aziya Dauysy (“Voice of Asia”) in Almaty in 2023, and Birlik Kerueni (“Caravan of Unity”) in Astana during the 5th edition of the World Nomad Games in 2024.

In 2022, his song Oilai Berem, a collaboration with singer 2RAR, won the award for “Best Collaboration (feat.)” at the first edition of the Beu Awards, a ceremony dedicated to contemporary Kazakh music. In 2023, he received the award for “Best Original Soundtrack (OST)” for his song Sayahat at the second edition of the ceremony. The following year he collaborated with artists Yenlik and ZAQ on a project initiated by inDrive Kazakhstan, which led to the release of the song JOL.

Zhugunussov performed at the Central Stadium of Almaty on October 11, 2025.

== Discography ==
=== EP ===
- Andetemin (2019)
(Әндетемін)
1. Andetemin (Әндетемін)
2. Senimen (Сенімен)
3. Suiem (Сүйем)
4. Onyñ (Оның)
5. Myñ Ese (Мың есе)
6. Baramyn (Барамын)
- Sen-Em (2023)
(Сен-Ем)
1. Zhanymda (Жанымда)
2. Tastama (Тастама)
3. Alystamashy (Алыстамашы)
4. Zhasyramyn (Жасырамын)
5. Taram Zhol (Тарам Жол)

=== Singles ===
Click to show the full list of singles

Title	Title (in Kazakh)	Year	Featuring
Zhanymdasyñ	Жанымдасың	2021	Rabiya Yergozhina
Qué Pasó		2021	Jawani
Sen Turaly	Сен Туралы	2021	
Kyzganamyn	Қызғанамын	2021	
Zymyran	Зымыран	2021	
Shyda	Шыда	2021	
Ömir Kitaby	Өмір Кітабы	2022	Azaliya
Roman	Роман	2022	Zhubanysh Zheksenuly
Oilai Berem	Ойлай Берем	2022	2RAR
Mama	Мама	2022	
Uaqyt	Уақыт	2022	
Kesh	Кеш	2022	
Suïem	Сүйем	2022	
Oiymda	Ойымда	2022	
Zhanamyn	Жанамын	2022	
Elestetem	Елестетем	2022	Mona Songz
Taptym, Mahabbatpen, Jusan	Таптым. Махаббатпен, Jusan	2023	Nazima
Biz Ekeumiz	Біз Екеуміз	2023	
Beri Qara	Бері Қара	2023	
Sayahat	Саяхат	2023	Alem
Oiladyñ ba?	Ойладың Ба?	2023	2RAR
Zhanym	Жаным	2023	
Zholdama	Жолдама	2024	
Sen Zhalgyz Emessiñ	Сен Жалғыз Емессің	2024	
Gashyqpyn	Ғашықпын	2024	Kazybek Kuraiysh
Tamsanamyn	Тамсанамын	2024	
Zhol	Жол	2024	Yenlik and ZAQ
Aspanga	Аспанға	2024	
Baqyt	Бақыт	2024	
Qymbattym	Қымбаттым	2024	Kalifarniya
Senesiñ Be?	Сенесің Бе?	2025	
Son	Сон	2025	
Sagyndyñ Ba?	Сағындың ба?	2025	
Sen Gana	Сен Ғана	2025	
Tungi Qala	Түнгі Қала	2025	
Shekara	Шекара	2026	
Senemin	Сенемін	2026	
Uaiymdama	Уайымдама	2026	Kalifarniya
Qabyrgam	Қабырғам	2026	Akha
Bari Uaqytsha	Бәрі Уақытша	2026	
Üyim	Үйім	2026	
Zhai Gana	Жай Ғана	2026	
