= Aygerim (given name) =

- Pronunciation: Kazakh pronunciation: [æjɡʲerɘm]
- Gender: Female

Origin
- Origin: Kazakh, Kyrgyz

Aygerim or Aigerim (Kazakh: Әйгерім, Äigerım, [æjɡʲerɘm], Kyrgyz: Айгерим) is a Kazakh and Kyrgyz female given name which is common in Kyrgyzstan and Kazakhstan, and means "wonderful moon." It is related to the Azerbaijani name Aygün.

== Given name ==
- Aigerim Aitymova (born 1993), Kazakh footballer
- Aygerim Kozhakanova (born 1994), Kazakh model
- Aigerim Mergenbay (born 2000), Kazakh singer and actress under the name C.C.TAY
- Aigerim Tazhi (born 1981), Kazakh poet
- Aigerim Zhexembinova (born 1993), Kazakh synchronized swimmer
