= Ione (group) =

- Origin: Almaty, Kazakhstan
- Genre: Q-pop
- Years active: 2025–present
- Labels: JUZ; BM
- Members: Aeris; Qaru; Narin; Kaya; Runa; Syrene; Ido

Ione (Cyrillic: Айуан; stylized as iONE or iONE!) is a Kazakh girl group formed by BM Production and Juz Entertainment in 2025. The group has seven members: Aeris, Qaru, Narin, Kaya, Runa, Syrene, and Ido. The group was formed through a competition web series titled Ione Project. Ione is considered a major recent act in Q-pop, a Kazakh music scene influenced by K-pop as well as various styles of Western popular music.

== Name ==
The name Ione is derived from the Kazakh word aywan, which translates to beast. Additionally, the name signifies that despite how each member is an individual (I), they can still come together as a whole (One).

== History ==
=== 2016–2025: Ione Project ===
In 2024, producers Bayan Alaguzova and Bagym Mukhitdenova of BM Production announced that they would be collaborating with Yerbolat Bedelkhan, founder of Juz Entertainment, to form a new Q-pop girl group. Throughout the following months, 12 contestants were cast from a pool of approximately 1,200 applicants for a competition reality show called Ione Project that would be posted to YouTube. The show featured challenges called missions in which the contestants would be tested on their singing and dancing abilities. During the program, the contestants performed versions of "Lady" by the Q-pop group Ninety One and "Kazakh Kyzdary" (romanized in the show as Qazaq Qyzdary) by the Kazakh girl group KeshYou.

On June 3, 2025, the final lineup was revealed. Controversy was drawn to this lineup due to group member Qaru being a close relative of Yerbolat Bedelkhan. She responded to this in an interview with HTK, stating that growing up near Bedelkhan helped her develop her artistic skills, and that she believed she won fairly since there were two other judges.

=== 2025–present: Debut and Kopbolikter ===
Ione released their official debut single, "Double Bubble Tea", on August 15, 2025, written by group member Qaru and arranged by Asalarman Syekei. The single was considered commercially unsuccessful. Ione completed a photo shoot with Elle Kazakhstan on November 13. On January 13, 2026, at midnight (UTC), Ione released the single "Moveback".

Ione released their debut extended play, Kopbolikter, on August 17, 2026. It comprised four tracks: "Olaiolaiolaiolai", "Kobelekter", "Ze'n", and "Diesel". In the days leading up to the EP's release, performance videos of each song were uploaded to Ione's YouTube channel. Each of them were shot in the same set containing an empty pool with different props. On August 21, a concert was held at Almaty Arena titled Ione Fest 2026. The event featured Ione along with Kazakh artists Ninety One and Ziruza as well as Korean artists Close Your Eyes, Rocky, and TNX.

== Artistry and reception ==
The Kazakh magazine '98Mag describes Ione as "a group united by a common goal—to speak to their audience honestly and without illusions". In a later piece, the magazine commends Ione for the ambition of Kopbolikter, but criticizes the group's lack of promotions, as well as their poor line delivery and live performance abilities.

Even those who regularly listen to Q-pop struggle to make out the lyrics sung by the girls. […] Additionally, the heavy use of AutoTune on some tracks raises the question: can the girls actually perform these songs live on stage with the same sound?

— '98mag, iONE! «айуан» болды ма? [Have iONE! (aywan) become beasts?]

== Members ==
- Aeris
- Qaru
- Narin
- Kaya
- Runa
- Syrene
- Ido

== Discography ==
=== Extended plays ===
Title	Album details
KOpbOliKTeR	Released: August 17, 2026; Label: BM Production; Formats: Digital download

=== Singles ===
Title	Year	Album
"Double Bubble Tea"	2025	Non-album singles
"Oina"	2025	Non-album singles
"Moveback"	2026	Non-album singles

== Concerts ==
- Ione Fest 2026 (2026; with Close Your Eyes, Ninety One, Rocky, TNX, and Ziruza)
