= Kazakhstan–Vietnam relations =

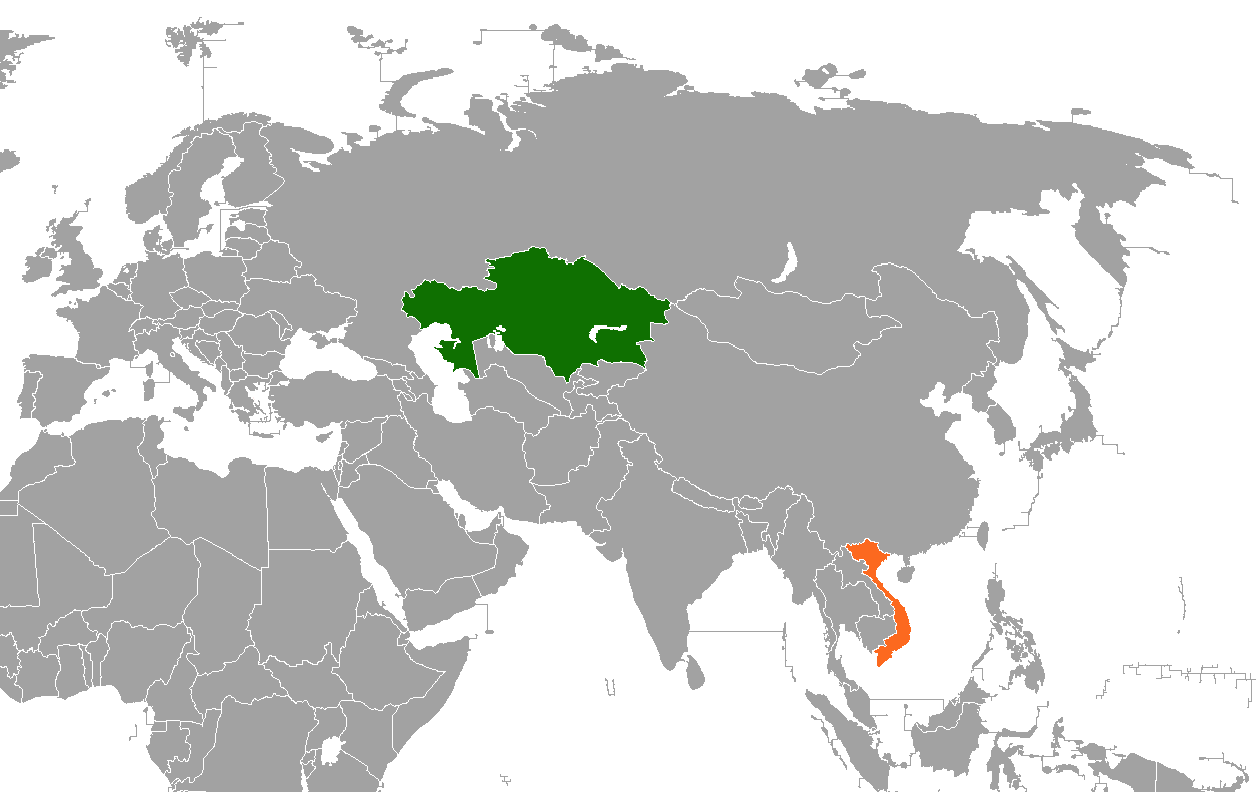

- Kazakhstan: Vietnam

Kazakhstan–Vietnam relations are foreign relations between Kazakhstan and Vietnam. Kazakhstan has an embassy in Hanoi, while Vietnam has an embassy in Astana.

== History ==
Relations between Kazakh and Vietnamese entities began during the 13th century, when the Mongols decided to invade Vietnam in order to add the country into its imperial realm of the Yuan dynasty. A large portion of the components of the Mongol force invading Vietnam included a significant number of Kipchak Turks from Golden Horde, who were the ancestors of modern Kazakh population and statehood. The Kipchaks had proven to be some of the bravest soldiers for the Mongol troops; however, most of them were annihilated in the battlefield, and those stayed behind had largely blended with local population and given up Islam in process.

By the 20th century, Kazakhstan and Vietnam found themselves tied to the Soviet sphere of influence, with Kazakhstan under direct Soviet rule, while the Democratic Republic of Vietnam was a Soviet-aligned state. The North Vietnamese leader, Ho Chi Minh, paid his visit to Almaty and personally greeted Dinmukhamed Konayev, the Communist Party's First Secretary in Kazakhstan. This was the only time a Vietnamese leader visited Kazakhstan prior to the fall of the Soviet Union.

== Modern times ==
Since Kazakhstan's independence and Vietnam's economic reforms, the two nations have worked to develop closer ties and relations.

=== Political relations ===
On 7 May 2025, Tô Lâm, First Secretary of the Communist Party of Vietnam, visited Kazakhstan to greet Kassym-Jomart Tokayev, before making his historic attendance to the Victory Day commemorating the end of World War II in Astana, the first time ever a Vietnamese leader attended a military parade in a post-Soviet nation other than Russia.

=== Economic relations ===
Kazakhstan is Vietnam's biggest trading partner in Central Asia, as Kazakhstan is part of the Eurasian Economic Union and Vietnam belongs to ASEAN. In 2016, the agreement between EEU and Vietnam took effect, boosting relationship between two countries. In 2025, Kazakhstan was the first Central Asian state to be named as a strategic partner for Vietnam, highlighting importance.

=== Tourist relations ===
Kazakhstan has increasingly become a favourite destination for many Vietnamese tourists, and vice versa. In 2024, Vietnam's state media VTV broadcast a short documentary about Kazakhstan called "Lively Kazakhstan" (Sức sống Kazakhstan), bringing Kazakhstan to Vietnamese public.

Additionally, Nha Trang, Khánh Hòa has also become increasingly attractive to many Kazakh tourists, many of them still develop ties to the place during the Soviet time when Soviet and Russian troops stationed in Cam Ranh, and a small clout of Kazakhs have resided in this city since 1980s.

== Diplomatic missions ==
- Kazakhstan has an embassy in Hanoi
- Vietnam has an embassy in Astana and a consulate-general in Almaty

== See also ==
- Foreign relations of Kazakhstan
- Foreign relations of Vietnam
- Eldar Sattarov – Kazakh writer of Vietnamese origin
- VietJet Qazaqstan
