= Lajeunesse =

Lajeunesse or La Jeunesse or Jeunesse or variant may refer to:

== People ==
- Claude Lajeunesse (born 1941), current President and Vice-Chancellor of Concordia University
- Emma Albani (1847-1930), born Marie-Louise-Emma-Cécile Lajeunesse, Canadian soprano
- Omer LaJeunesse (1908-1994), U.S. American football player
- Serge Lajeunesse (born 1950), retired ice hockey defenceman

== Literature ==
- Gabriel Lajeunesse, a character in the poem Evangeline, A Tale of Acadie
- La Jeunesse, or New Youth, an influential Chinese literary magazine of the 20th century

== Other ==
- Jeunesse Esch, the Jeunesse soccer team in Esch
- La Jeunesse, a sculpture by Pierre Charles Lenoir
- Youth (1934 film) or Jeunesse, a French drama film directed by Georges Lacombe

== See also ==
- Pavillon de la Jeunesse, indoor arena in Quebec City, Quebec, Canada
- Coupe de la Jeunesse, international rowing regatta
- Front de la Jeunesse (disambiguation)
- Novaya Yunost
