= Dombyra Party =

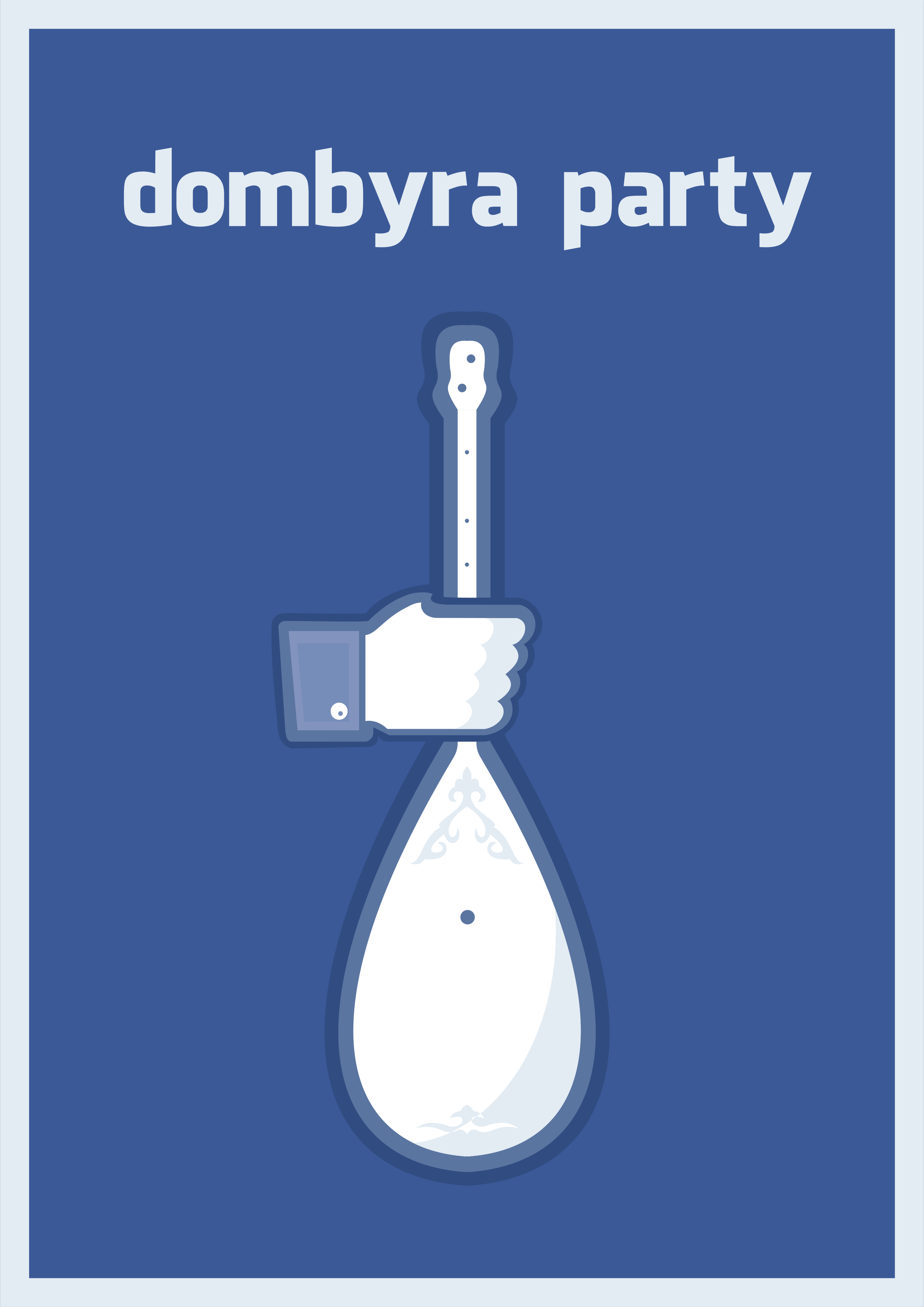
Popular logo of Dombyra Party used on Facebook

Dombyra Party (Kazakh: Домбыра Party, Домбыра пати) — is a flash mob-like movement of Kazakh youth to popularize Kazakh national musical instruments, especially dombyra. The events host was Maralbek Sagynganov, one of the leading journalists of Kazakhstan. The movement is non-political.

Dombyra Parties are usually held on weekdays in crowded alleys or at parks. They have occurred in Astana, Almaty, Shymkent and Atyrau and others. At the weekly events, attendants mainly play dombyra and sing dombyra-accompanied songs. One of the features of dombyra parties is to prove that anyone can learn to play the instrument without studying at music schools.

Invitations to Dombyra parties are sent via social networks. Video recordings are shared via video portals and social media. A Facebook group allows users to discuss issues related to organizational staff.

== History ==
The Dombyra party was initiated by Kazakh bloggers, using the "KerekInfo" platform in 2012. The first event took place on August 12 in Astana. Since then, Dombyra Parties have been held in almost every big city, as well as in Istanbul, London, Berlin and Porto.

The official start date of the Dombira Party is August 16, 2012. A group of young people, including Arshat Orazov, Aldan Zylgeldy, Nurgisa Asylbekov, Maralbek Sagynganov, Janasyl Bolatbek, Daniyar Alan, Almas Altai and Nurbergen Makym, initiated this unique project. Their aim was to promote Kazakh national musical instruments, such as Dombyra.
