= Yenlik =

Yenlik Еңлік
- Born: Eñlik Qūrarbek; 28 February 1997 (age 29); Boraldai, Almaty Region, Kazakhstan
- Genres: R&B; hip hop; pop
- Occupation: Singer-songwriter
- Years active: 2021–present

Eñlik Qūrarbek (Note: Often transliterated as Yenlik Kurarbek through a Russified Romanization of Енлик Курарбек.) (Kazakh: Еңлік Құрарбек; born 28 February 1997), known mononymously as Yenlik, is a Kazakh singer and songwriter who performs primarily in Kazakh. Her work spans contemporary R&B, hip hop, and pop.

== Early life and education ==
Yenlik was born on 28 February 1997 in the settlement of Boraldai in Almaty Region. She studied at the Abylai Khan University of Foreign Languages, where she trained as a teacher of English. She later studied vocals at JuzAcademy and began composing songs while still a student.

== Career ==
Yenlik left her position as an English teacher in a rural school to pursue a career in music. Her early tracks began to receive attention in 2021, including the single DOP. She subsequently released Bipl, Bir kem düniye ("Imperfect World"), and a cover of the 1980s Kazakh song Men dep oila ("Think of Me").

In 2022 she released the song Shukir in cooperation with BTS Education. The accompanying video, filmed in the style of a school musical, supported a youth professional orientation initiative through EduNavigator.kz. Her lyrics and style combine elements of Kazakh folk music with contemporary hip hop. In interviews she has compared the improvisational aspect of rap to the Kazakh oral performance practice known as Aytysh.

In 2026, Yenlik became the first artist from Kazakhstan to be featured on the international music platform COLORSxSTUDIOS.

== Discography ==
=== Charted singles ===
List of charted singles, showing year released, chart positions and album name
Title	Year	Peak chart positions	Album
Title	Year	KAZ Air.	Album
"Ökpeletpe"	2025	88	Bipl

=== Selected Music ===
Song	Year	Featured artists	Album	Ref
DOP	2021		Non-album singles	
Tauda	2021		Non-album singles	
Shaiqa	2022	dudeontheguitar, De Lacure	Non-album singles	
Bipl	2021		Non-album singles	
Bir kem düniye	2021		Non-album singles	
Men dep oila (cover)	2021		Non-album singles	
Shukir	2022		Non-album singles	
I Can Believe	2022	Shiza	Non-album singles	
DAM/KFC	2022		Non-album singles	
Dosyma Hat	2022	Hey Monro, rauana	Non-album singles	
àkel àkel	2023	Taspay	Non-album singles	
ESEP	2023		Non-album singles	
Erikpe (cover)	2023		Non-album singles	
Ne Isteisiń?	2024		Non-album singles	
JOL	2024	жугунусов-мирас, ZAQ, Sapar	Non-album singles	
One One	2024	De Lacure	Non-album singles	
Meili	2025		Bipl	
Intro	2025		Bipl	
Eshki	2025		Bipl	
Desekte	2025		Bipl	
Ait	2025		Bipl	
Everest	2025	Darkhan Juzz	Bipl	
Mahabbat	2025		Bipl	
16 Qyz	2025	Ali Nasr	Bipl	
Darezhe	2025		Bipl	
Outro	2025		Bipl	
Bipl	2026			

== See also ==
- Music of Kazakhstan
- Q-pop
