= Ziruza =

- Born: Ziruza Sapargaliqyzy Tasmagambetova (Kazakh: Зируза Сапарғалиқызы Тасмағамбетова); 10 January 1997 (age 28); Amangeldi District, Torgay Region, Kazakhstan
- Genres: Q-pop, R&B
- Years active: 2017–present
- Labels: UKCMUSIC

Ziruza Tasmagambetova (Kazakh: Зируза Сапарғалиқызы Тасмағамбетова, Ziruza Saparğaliqyzy Tasmağambetova; born 10 January 1997), known professionally as Ziruza, is a Q-pop singer, songwriter and actress. The first video clip was released in 2017 for the song "Айт ендi".

== Career ==
Ziruza was born in Turgai Oblast (now Kostanay Region, Kazakhstan), then she and her parents lived in the cities of Astana and Almaty.

At the beginning of her career, she tried to become a member of the female group under the label Juz Entertainment, but it was not destined to happen. In 2017, producer Yerlan Alimov noticed Ziruza, and offered a contract for seven years, until 2024. The collaboration resulted in several music videos that gathered several million views on YouTube. She also participated as an actress in several domestic TV series. In December 2019 at the Eurasian Music Awards EMA-2019 together with the band Alar won the award in the category "Duo of the Year". There Ziruza also won the Queen of Q-Pop award.

== Discography ==
=== Albums ===
Title
Details
Note
Қиын Оңай
- Released: 20 August 2018
- Label: ТОО "Много Музыки"
- Format: Digital Distribution

* Track listing
No.	Title	Length
1.	"Айт ендi"	3:30
2.	"Jana"	3:29
3.	"Сағыну"	4:15
4.	"Төзім"	3:53
5.	"Қиын / Оңай"	3:36
6.	"Жолама"	3:45
7.	"Kesh"	3:15
8.	"Queen"	3:15
Total length:		28:58

Kim Kelesi
- Released: 14 May 2020
- Label: Gakku
- Format: Digital Distribution

* Track listing
No.	Title	Length
1.	"Maneken"	2:30
2.	"Sybyrlaidy"	3:22
3.	"Kobelek"	3:04
4.	"24/7"	3:04
5.	"Ne bop ketty"	3:09
6.	"Kim kelesi"	2:41
7.	"Songy nukte"	2:37
Total length:		20:22

=== Music videos ===
Year	Song	Director	Link
2017	Айт ендi	Ernar Nurgaliyev	Video on YouTube
2017	Қиын/Оңай	—	Video on YouTube
2017	Төзім (OST "Ана жүрегі")	—	Video on YouTube
2018	Kesh	Valery Zadarnovski jr	Video on YouTube
2018	S.O.S	Valery Zadarnovski jr	Video on YouTube
2019	Тағы да (feat. Alar)	Valery Zadarnovski jr	Video on YouTube
2019	24/7	Valery Zadarnovski jr	Video on YouTube
2019	Sońǵy núkte	—	Video on YouTube
2019	Сағыну	—	Video on YouTube
