= Front de la Jeunesse =

There are several movements called Front de la Jeunesse:

- Front de la Jeunesse, a disbanded militant movement in Belgium.
- Front de la Jeunesse, the youth organization of the French Front National.

== See also ==
- Lajeunesse (disambiguation)
