= Adaptatsiya =

Rock band from Kazakhstan

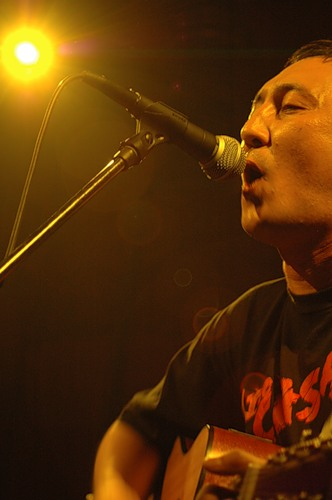
- Yermen Anti Erzhanov

Background information
- Origin: Aktobe, Kazakhstan
- Genres: Punk rock, post-punk, experimental rock
- Years active: 1992–present
- Labels: Wyrgorod
- Members: Yermen Anti; Alexey Gatilov; Artyom Ossipov; Oleg Gorbenko
- Website: http://ermen.antimusic.ru/

Adaptatsiya (Russian: Адаптация, Russian for Adaptation) is a Kazakhstani punk rock band founded in 1992 in Aktobe.

== History ==
Yermen Anti Erzhanov was born on 26 July 1974. In 1992 Yermen formed the Adaptatsiya. The inspiration for him were Grazhdanskaya Oborona and Alexander Bashlachev.

== Members ==
Last known lineup:

- Yermen Anti Erzhanov – vocals, guitar, author of music and lyrics
- Vadim Kurylev – guitar
- Ibragim Dzhanibekov – drums

== Lyrics ==
Adaptatsiya is Russian language band, but some songs are in Kazakh. Adaptatsiya has lyrics dealing with social issues

== Discography ==
1. Колесо истории – 1997
2. На нелегальном положении – 1998
3. Джут – 2001
4. Punk rock du Kazakhstan – 2003
5. За измену Родине – 2003
6. Уносимся прочь – 2005
7. Так горит степь – 2005
8. Время убийц – 2008
9. Песни любви и протеста – 2009
10. No pasaran! – 2011
11. Пластилин – 2013
12. Передвижные Хиросимы (трибьют-альбом) – 2013
13. Цинга −2015
14. Radio Resistance – 2017
15. Олдскул – 2017

== See also ==
- Music of Kazakhstan
- Russian rock
