= Arkalyk =

Arkalyk Арқалық
- City
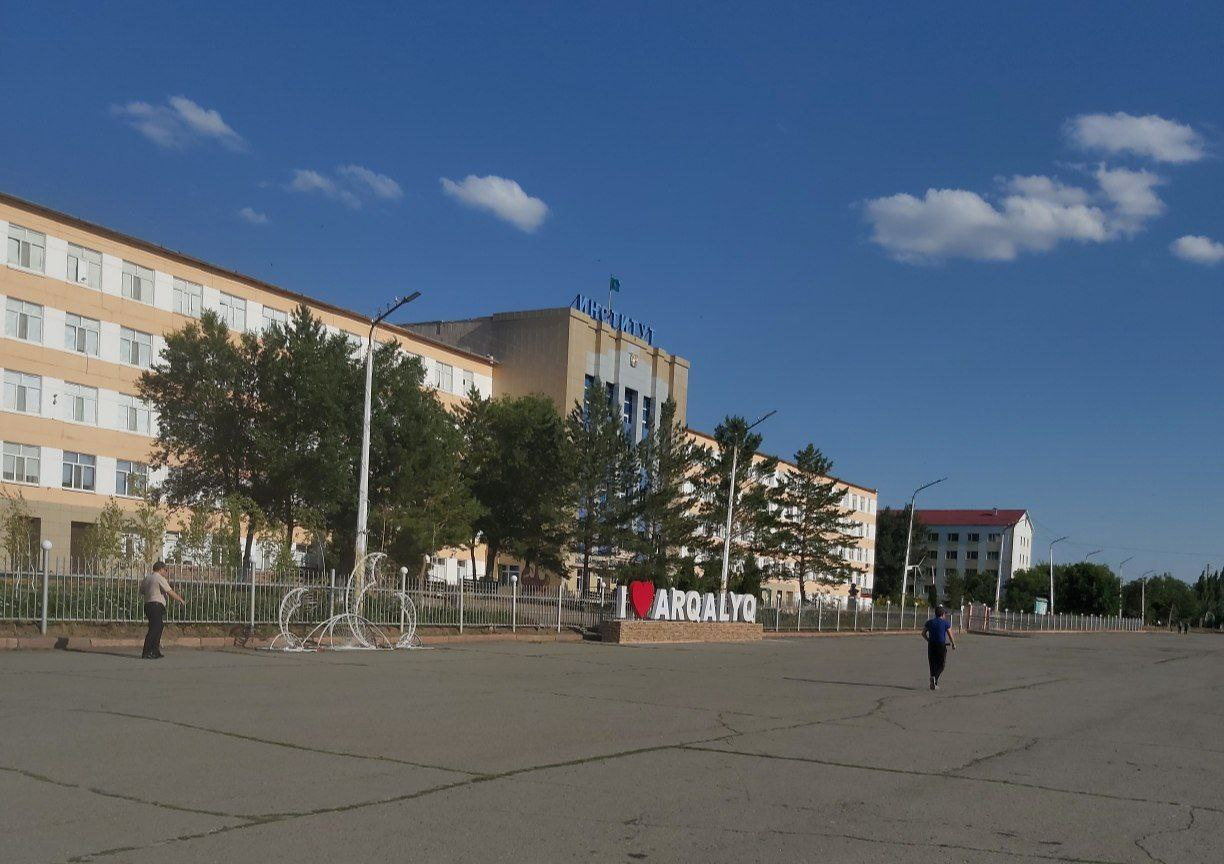
- Arkalyk Pedagogical Institute

- Coat of arms
- Interactive map of Arkalyk
- Location in Kazakhstan
- Coordinates: 50°14′53″N 66°55′40″E
- Country: Kazakhstan
- Region: Kostanay Region

Government
  - Akim: Amirkhan Asanov

Population (2009)
  - Total: 28,169
- Time zone: UTC+05:00 (Kazakhstan Time)
- Climate: Dfb
- Website: http://www.arkalyk.kz/

Arkalyk or Arqalyq (Kazakh: Арқалық, Arqalyq, pronounced [ɑɾqɑɫɯq]; Russian: Аркалык) is a city in Kostanay Region, northern Kazakhstan. Earlier, it was the centre of Torgay Region, which was abolished in 1997. Established in 1956, it acquired the status of the city in 1965. The distance from the town of Arkalyk to Qostanai is 480 km (298 mi), to Astana is 670 km (416 mi). Population: 28,169 (2009 census results);45,736 (1999 census results).

The Arkalyk Business Centre describes today's Arkalyk as "a city of miners, of regional administrators, and people excited to live in a regional center". Historically Arkalyk was a centre for the Soviet space programme. Cosmonauts would land on the huge central Kazakh steppe and come back to Arkalyk before heading to the Baikonur, the Soviet Union's premier "space city". Arkalyk is served by Arkalyk Airport.

The city is linked by rail communication with the regional center (terminal station on a branch Esil - Derzhavinsk - Arkalyk). Roads Kostanay - Arkalyk tarmac, but is severely broken in the state. Roads Zhezkazgan - Arkalyk ground, in the wet weather becomes difficult even for freight transport because of mud. There is an airport (located 6 kilometers north-east of the city), capable of class aircraft Tu-154, Tu-134, etc. In Soviet times, it carried out flights to many cities in Kazakhstan, but since the mid-1990s an airport has been practically abandoned and used only sporadically during the search and rescue for the planting of crewed spaceaids.

== History ==
Arkalyk was founded in 1956 as a settlement of geologists and builders. By birth, it was obliged to open after the war for deposits of bauxite (raw material for aluminum production). On May 17, 1956, in a joint decree of the CPSU Central Committee and USSR Council of Ministers a separate line was written: «On the basis of Amangeldy bauxite deposits construct and put into operation Torghay bauxite mines ». In the 1960s Arkalyk was declared the All-Union shock Komsomol building, there was the young people flock from all over the USSR. In 1965 Arkalyk received city status and in 1971 became the center of the newly created Torghay area.

In the 1980s the city reached its peak: it produced meat, poultry, and dairy. It functioned grain elevator, ceramic factory, sewing factory, the factory radio, factory built Aviamotornaya, Turgay bauxite mine (TBRU), which extracted up to 20% of bauxite ores in the USSR. But despite the industrial production, the economy of Torgay Region was behind other regions of Kazakhstan due to large agricultural sector which was 90%. The region constantly demanded subsidies from the national budget, so in June 1988 it was dissolved and its territory was divided between Kostanai and Aqmola areas. When the city stopped to be a regional center, some parts of the infrastructure was evacuated (for example, regional radio station), and a number of potential industrial sites was frozen.

In 1989, active inhabitants of Arkalyk organized committee to restore Torgay Region. In August 1990, Torgay Region was re-established, and Arkalyk become the regional center again.

Degradation of the city began in 1993-1994: production fell into decay. Migration began to other regions of Kazakhstan, Russia and Germany. Consequently, population of the city reduced. In 1991 it was 65,000 people, in 1999 it was 45,000, now it is 23,000 people. During 90s there were disrupted public services such as lengthy interruption of electricity, heat and water. In 1997, Turgay area has been disbanded again, and its territory was again moved into Kostanai and Akmola areas.

Some of the city districts as a part of #6, all of #7 and #9 were completely abandoned by the 2000s. Migration from the city was a complicated process which started in 90s. Full optimization stopped in 2000–2001. Enterprising businessmen from other regions of Kazakhstan dismantled the houses by removing building materials.

At the turn of 20th and 21st century, local authorities organized a campaign to relocate the remaining residents from the abandoned districts to the older city center, so the cost for municipal services would be reduced and communication would be significantly improved.

Currently, the city of Arkalyk is included in the list of depressed cities of Kazakhstan due to a very high level of unemployment. Industry in the city is virtually non-existent, except for maintaining the life of city and Torgayskogo bauxite mine, which is housed in SC «Aluminum of Kazakhstan». All produced bauxiteore is sent to the aluminum plant in Pavlodar, and other regions. Establishment of an aluminum smelter in Arkalyk is difficult due to lack of water.

Prospectives of Arkalyk are dual. On the one hand, the town has the bauxite mine which over the next 15–20 years will exhaust deposits and it will be possible to extract refractory clay only. On the other hand, there are a number of other minerals such as Jean-Arkalykskoe field has the shallow bed (up to 50 meters); Akzhalskoe field nefritoidov has the jewelry and raw materials; Akbulakskoe field has white marble; Agyrzhalskoe field has black marble; Jean-Arkalykskoe has deposits of therapeutic mineral waters. Development of these fields could lead to the economic and social revival of the region.

== Climate ==
Arkalyk has a cold and continental climate. There is more rainfall in winter than in summer. The average annual temperature in Arkalyk is 4.5 °C (40.1 °F). About 246 mm (9.69 in) of precipitation falls annually.

Climate data for Arkalyk (1991-2020, extremes 1958–present)
Month	Jan	Feb	Mar	Apr	May	Jun	Jul	Aug	Sep	Oct	Nov	Dec	Year
Record high °C (°F)	6.0 (42.8)	6.7 (44.1)	19.6 (67.3)	31.0 (87.8)	36.1 (97.0)	40.5 (104.9)	42.6 (108.7)	42.0 (107.6)	40.0 (104.0)	28.5 (83.3)	14.3 (57.7)	11.7 (53.1)	42.6 (108.7)
Mean daily maximum °C (°F)	−11.1 (12.0)	−9.8 (14.4)	−2.1 (28.2)	12.3 (54.1)	21.3 (70.3)	26.6 (79.9)	27.9 (82.2)	27.0 (80.6)	19.7 (67.5)	11.2 (52.2)	−0.9 (30.4)	−8.1 (17.4)	9.5 (49.1)
Daily mean °C (°F)	−14.9 (5.2)	−14.1 (6.6)	−6.7 (19.9)	6.3 (43.3)	14.6 (58.3)	19.9 (67.8)	21.2 (70.2)	19.8 (67.6)	12.9 (55.2)	5.0 (41.0)	−5.2 (22.6)	−11.9 (10.6)	3.9 (39.0)
Mean daily minimum °C (°F)	−18.4 (−1.1)	−18.1 (−0.6)	−10.7 (12.7)	1.0 (33.8)	8.1 (46.6)	13.5 (56.3)	14.7 (58.5)	13.2 (55.8)	6.9 (44.4)	0.3 (32.5)	−8.4 (16.9)	−15.4 (4.3)	−1.1 (30.0)
Record low °C (°F)	−42.0 (−43.6)	−42.2 (−44.0)	−38.9 (−38.0)	−24.8 (−12.6)	−9.8 (14.4)	−0.3 (31.5)	2.0 (35.6)	−3.0 (26.6)	−9.2 (15.4)	−22.0 (−7.6)	−36.3 (−33.3)	−41.0 (−41.8)	−42.2 (−44.0)
Average precipitation mm (inches)	23.0 (0.91)	21.7 (0.85)	20.7 (0.81)	20.9 (0.82)	28.1 (1.11)	28.6 (1.13)	33.5 (1.32)	24.7 (0.97)	18.2 (0.72)	27.7 (1.09)	25.2 (0.99)	23.5 (0.93)	295.8 (11.65)
Average precipitation days (≥ 1.0 mm)	6.8	5.1	5.8	4.7	5.7	4.9	5.0	3.9	3.8	5.6	6.1	6.7	64.1
Source 1: Pogoda.ru.net
Source 2: NOAA

== Educational Institution City ==
- Arkalyk pedagogical Institute named I. Altynsarin.
- Torghay humanities college.
- Torghay Agro-Technical College.
- Arkalyk Medical College.
- Arkalyk College of Economics and Law \Kazpotrebsoyuz\
- Arkalyk Kazakh-Turkish High School

== Nature ==
Area is a hilly terrain with absolute marks 320–360 meters north of the city up to 390 m (1,280 ft). The radius of 6 km (4 mi) from the city are extensive mining (related to mining bauxite ore), the depth of 20–50 m.

The natural reservoirs are not numerous, except for two drying creeks Akjar (in the northern part of town) and Arkalyksay (in the southern part of town), running from the East to the West.

== Natural wealth ==
Near the town of Arkalyk is 6 bauxite for the aluminum industry. This Arkalyk, Lower Ashut, Ushtobe, Northern, Upper Ashut and Aktas. These same deposits associated classes of refractory clay. In addition, the bauxite, the associated component is gallium, stocks of which is formed by 761 kilograms. At the distance of 5 km (3 mi) from the city there is another lead field "Jana-Arkalyk" under exploration. Among the associated components of the ore we can find yttrium, gold, silver, tin, and others. The reserves of Jana-Arkalyk deposit are estimated at 6 million tons of lead. In the same area there are 37 fields common minerals including 28-brick commodity, 4-building stone, construction sand 5. 100 km (62 mi) from the city there is Akzhal deposit of nephritis, which was mined in 1997 for extraction purposes of decorative facing stone. Within the radius of 70–100 km away from the city there are deposits with an estimated volume of 3-6 million cubic metres of White Akbulak Marble and deposits of Agirjal black marble with reserves of about 8 million cubic metres. Newspaper Torghay for 23 September 2005.
