= Karakoin =

Salt lake in Kazakhstan

- Қарақойын
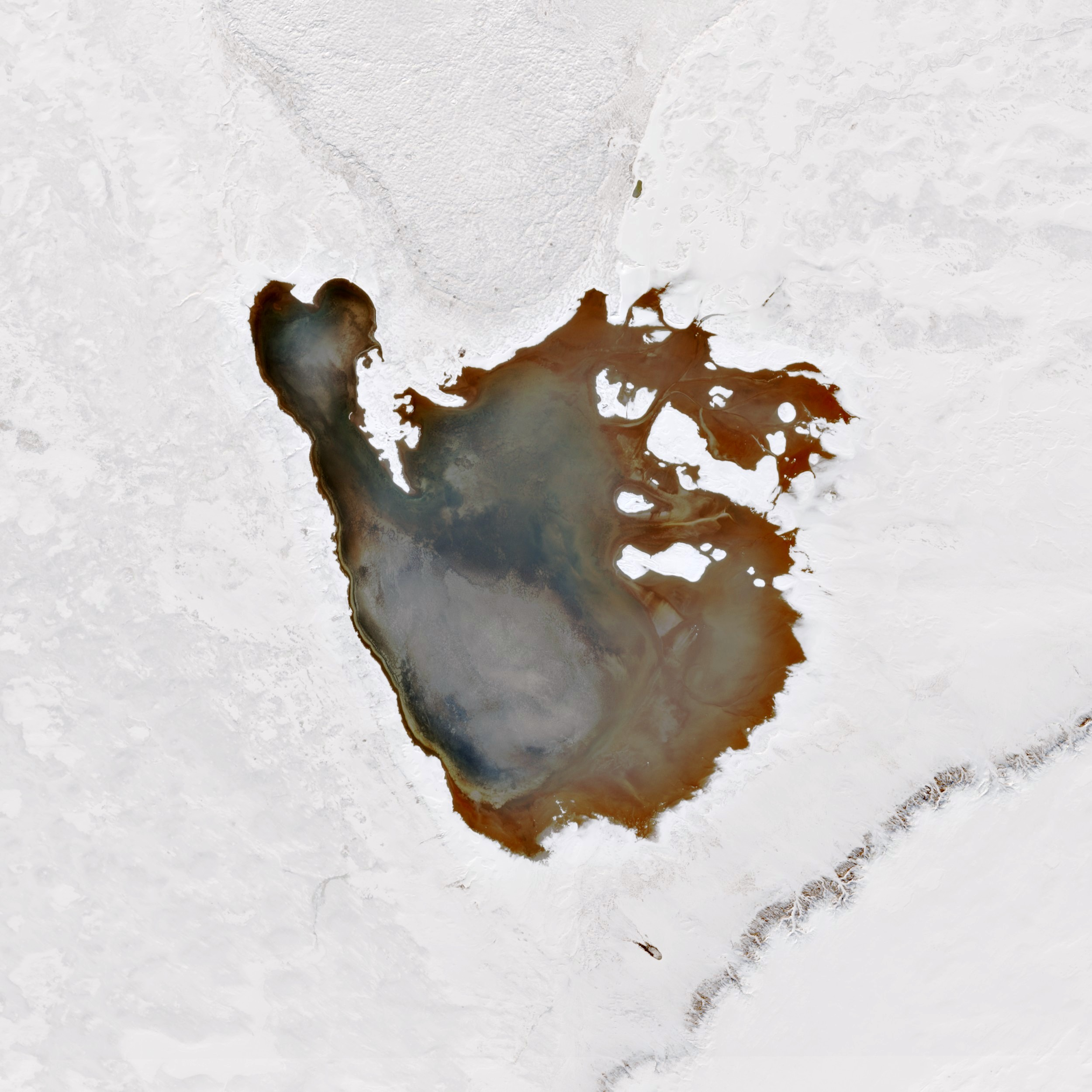
- Sentinel-2 image of the lake in February

- Location within Kazakhstan
- Coordinates: 46°09′N 68°38′E
- Type: Salt lake
- Primary inflows: Katagansay and Taldyespe
- Catchment area: 11,800 square kilometers (4,600 sq mi)
- Basin countries: Kazakhstan
- Max. length: 16.8 kilometers (10.4 mi)
- Max. width: 8.3 kilometers (5.2 mi)
- Surface area: 72.5 square kilometers (28.0 sq mi)
- Islands: Yes

Karakoin (Kazakh: Қарақойын; Russian: Каракоин) is a salt lake in Ulytau District, Ulytau Region, Kazakhstan.

It is the largest lake in the district. The area around Karakoin is sparsely inhabited. The lake basin is a seasonal grazing ground for local cattle.

== Geography ==
Karakoin is an endorheic lake in the Sarysu basin. It is located in an arid zone at the northern edge of the Betpak-Dala. The western lakeshore is nearly straight and rises abruptly from the lake surface, while the eastern is low, marshy and deeply indented. There are some small islands close to the eastern lakeshore.

The lake fills during the spring thaw, with intermittent rivers Katagansay and Taldyespe flowing into it and bringing the lake to reach a surface of 80 square kilometers (31 sq mi) to 90 square kilometers (35 sq mi) in years of abundant snowfall. Usually it almost dries completely in the summer. The bottom of the lake is flat and muddy. The mud is reputed to have medicinal properties.

== See also ==
- Kazakh semi-desert
- List of lakes of Kazakhstan
