= Toi music =

Central Asian music

Toi
- Stylistic origins: Arabic; hindustani; persian
- Cultural origins: early 20th century, Central Asia
- Typical instruments: Vocals; dombra; dutar; komuz; mey; shangqobyz; synthesizer
- Derivative forms: Q-pop

Fusion genres
- Toi hip hop, Toi pop

Toi music (Той) is a genre of popular folk music originated from Central Asia. This genre of music is popular in countries like Uzbekistan, Kazakhstan and Kyrgyzstan.

== Etymology ==
The meanings of toi or tой in several Turkic languages are either celebration, gathering, or wedding. This is because toi music usually played at social gatherings, where toi musicians usually invited to perform in it.
