= Aigerim Tazhi =

Kazakhstani poet (born 1981)

- Born: November 15, 1981 (age 44); Aktobe, Kazakhstan
- Occupation: Poet
- Writing career
- Genre: Poetry
- Notable works: BOG-O-SLOV; Paper-Thin Skin

Aigerim Tazhi (Айгерим Тажи) is a Kazakhstani poet. Tazhi's poetry has been published in world literary magazines and translated into many languages. Tazhi is the author of the poetry collection БОГ-О-СЛОВ (THEO-LOG-IAN) (Kazakhstan, Musagetes, 2004) and the bilingual poetry book Paper-Thin Skin/Бумажная кожа (USA, Zephyr Press, 2019, original and English transl.). According to reviews of her poetry, critics noted "Tazhi’s poems have been widely praised as a fresh new voice and for blazing a new direction among the youngest generation of Kazakh poets" and "In Aigerim Tazhi’s poetry, we may find the marvelous that drew us to poetry to begin with".

== Life and career ==
Aigerim Tazhi was born in the western Kazakhstani city of Aktobe (formerly called Aktyubinsk) in 1981. She is a graduate of the Aktyubinsk (Zhubanov) State University.

Her debut book of poetry, БОГ-О-СЛОВ (THEO-LOG-IAN, which could also be read as GOD O' WORDS), was published in 2004. Tazhi's work has been featured in many notable literary magazines and anthologies, including Novy Mir, Znamya, Druzhba Narodov, Vozdukh, Novaya Yunost and others.

Tazhi's second book of poetry, Paper-Thin Skin/Бумажная кожа (Zephyr Press, USA) was published as a bilingual English-Russian volume in 2019. The book received numerous positive reviews from Asian, American and European critics. The translation of Tazhi's book was supported by the Translation Fellowship from the National Endowment for the Arts.

Tazhi's poems have been translated into various languages, including English, French, Dutch, Polish, German, Arabic, Armenian, Uzbek, Japanese, and others, and published in literary magazines and anthologies in multiple countries, including The Kenyon Review, The Massachusetts Review, Prairie Schooner, Atlanta Review, Colorado Review, Stand, St. Petersburg Review, Two Lines, Words Without Borders, The Common, etc.

She is a Fellow in Writing of the International Writing Program IWP 2023 in Iowa City, USA, and Hong Kong International Writers’ Workshop (2025).

She is the author of the audio-visual art project AiTys (since 2023) uniting her own poetry, voice, sound, music, performance on the ancient Kazakh instrument kobyz, and the visual imagery – all created by her. Tazhi is also the creator of the project merging poetry, literary installations and performances, The Visible Poetry, launched in 2009, the project Versed Voices (a collaboration between music, choir and poetry) and others.

Aigerim Tazhi lives in Almaty, Kazakhstan.

== Critical reception ==
Elmira Elvazova writes in The Massachusetts Review, "Tazhi’s poetry is one of a reversal of roles, a depersonalized narrative, built from a heightened observational sense and attunement to the outer world that dramatizes the inner landscape, where phenomenal imagery accrues, where roles, sensations, and images are always changing, metamorphosing, as the angle of the sun shifts. [...] Aigerim Tazhi’s Paper-Thin Skin is a work of stunning originality."

Alison Mandaville of World Literature Today writes, "Tazhi’s poetry is a music that explores our shared borders as spaces of opportunity, for the possibility of creating “an imagined world: one that absorbs music from the outside, / and will not preserve the borders / of an internal country."

Aleksey Alekhin of Arion writes, "Aigerim Tazhi’s poetic thinking is laconic, but in a few lines of rhyming or free verse she manages to fit a considerable world. Distinguished at first by sharply noticed material detail, sketching, gesture, this world is turned back to the reader with its own psychological and even metaphysical essence."

Galina Klimova of Druzhba Narodov writes, "Conversation, prayer, meditation + a fulcrum – sometimes in rhyme, sometimes with assonance. But what is stronger and more dependable is her rhythm. In her poems there is a great deal of room for all the details of time, places and events which are explained simply and confidently without forced pathos and ambiguous innuendoes."

Timothy Walsh of Rain Taxi Review writes, "Tazhi’s poems are strikingly imagistic, her syntax shorn of unnecessary appendages. By steering clear of any narrative thread or conceptual utterance, they seem like pure instants of perception."

== Honors and awards ==
Tazhi has received multiple international literary prizes. She won the International Literary Steps Prize in poetry (Moscow, 2003). In 2011, she was a finalist for the International Debut Prize (Moscow) in Poetry. Twice she was the Laureate for the International Shabyt Festival (Astana). In 2016, her poetry book manuscript was awarded a National Endowment for the Arts (NEA) Fellowship.

In 2019, Tazhi was included in the prize list of the International Literary Poetry Prize (Moscow). Later that year, Tazhi became a finalist of the International Literary Voloshin Contest (Moscow). Her book Paper-Thin Skin was awarded The Käpylä Translation Prize, and World Literature Today included the book to the list of the Most Notable Translations of 2019.

She is a Fellow in Writing of the International Writing Program IWP 2023 in Iowa City, USA, and Hong Kong International Writers’ Workshop (2025).

== Interviews ==
- I am interested in the world in its different manifestations... 5Q Interview: Aigerim Tazhi Айгерим Тажи, IWP Resident. The Writing University, 2023
- Sometimes One Drop is Enough to Change the Whole Ocean: Aigerim Tazhi. Interview by Philip Metres. Dispatches from the Poetry Wars, 2014
- American Publisher to Release Collection of Poems by Kazakh Poet Aigerim Tazhi. The Astana Times, 2016
- A cure for the modern world: Aigerim Tazhi. Interview by Vassilina Atoyanz. Forbes Kazakhstan, 2014
