= Ulytau (band) =

Kazakh folk metal band

Ulytau Ұлытау
- Origin: Kazakhstan
- Genres: Folk metal Neo-classical metal
- Years active: 2001–present
- Members: Nurgaisha Sadvakasova; Yerzhan Alimbetov; Makism Kichigin
- Website: www.ulytau.kz

Ulytau (Kazakh: Ұлытау, romanized: Ūlytau), literally meaning "the great mountain", is a popular Turkic instrumental folk metal trio from Kazakhstan. Their music combines the sound of the violin and electric guitar with the dombra, a traditional two stringed instrument from their country.

The band is named after the district of Ulytau in Central Kazakhstan, the mythical birthplace of the nation.

== Biography ==
Ulytau was conceived as a project by producer Kydyrali Bolmanov in 2001 to merge Western and Eastern music with arrangements of classical music from such composers as Kurmangazy Sagyrbayuly, Antonio Vivaldi, Niccolò Paganini and Johann Sebastian Bach. They have since toured Germany, England, Scotland, Poland, US, Turkey, China, Japan and Russia. The band was awarded the "Golden Disc" in 2001 for their song "Aday" that was based on a composition from Kurmangazy of the same name. The song was also featured on the Rough Guide compilation to the music of Central Asia.

== Discography ==
- Jumyr-Kylysh (2006) (In Germany released 2009 as Two Warriors)

== Members ==
=== Line-up ===
- Erjan Alimbetov – Dombra
- Maxim Kichigin – Guitar
- Alua Makanova – Violin
- Nurgaisha Sadvakasova – Violin (previous)

=== Session musicians ===
- Roman Adonin – Keyboards
- Oleg Tarnovskiy – Guitar
- Serik Sansyzbayev – Bass
- Rafael Arslanov – Drums
