= Wooden jaw harp =

The wooden jaw harp or shangqobyz (Kazakh: ағаш шаңқобыз; Kyrgyz: жыгач ооз комуз, pronounced [dʒɯʁɑ́tʃ oːz qomúz]) is a type of jaw harp made out of wood, common in the folk music of Turkic peoples in Central Asia. The principals used to produce notes are similar to those for a metal jaw harp, but wooden jaw harps are often much larger in size, resembling a simple bow.

The instrument is used in Toi folk music in Central Asia.
