= Ulytau (village) =

Village in Kazakhstan

Ulytau Ұлытау
- Location in Kazakhstan
- Coordinates: 48°39′17″N 67°00′28″E
- Country: Kazakhstan
- Region: Ulytau Region
- District: Ulytau District

Population (2009)
  - Total: 2,055
- Time zone: UTC+6
- Postcode: 101500

Ulytau (Kazakh: Ұлытау; Russian: Улытау) is a settlement in Ulytau District, Ulytau Region, Kazakhstan. It is the administrative center of the district and the only populated center of the Ulytau rural district (KATO code - 35603010). Population: 2,055 (2009 census results); 2,605 (1999 census results).

== Geography ==
Ulytau is located 130 kilometers (81 mi) to the NNW of Zhezkazgan city, by the eastern slopes of the Ulytau mountains.
