= C.C.TAY =

Kazakhstani singer and actress (born 2000)

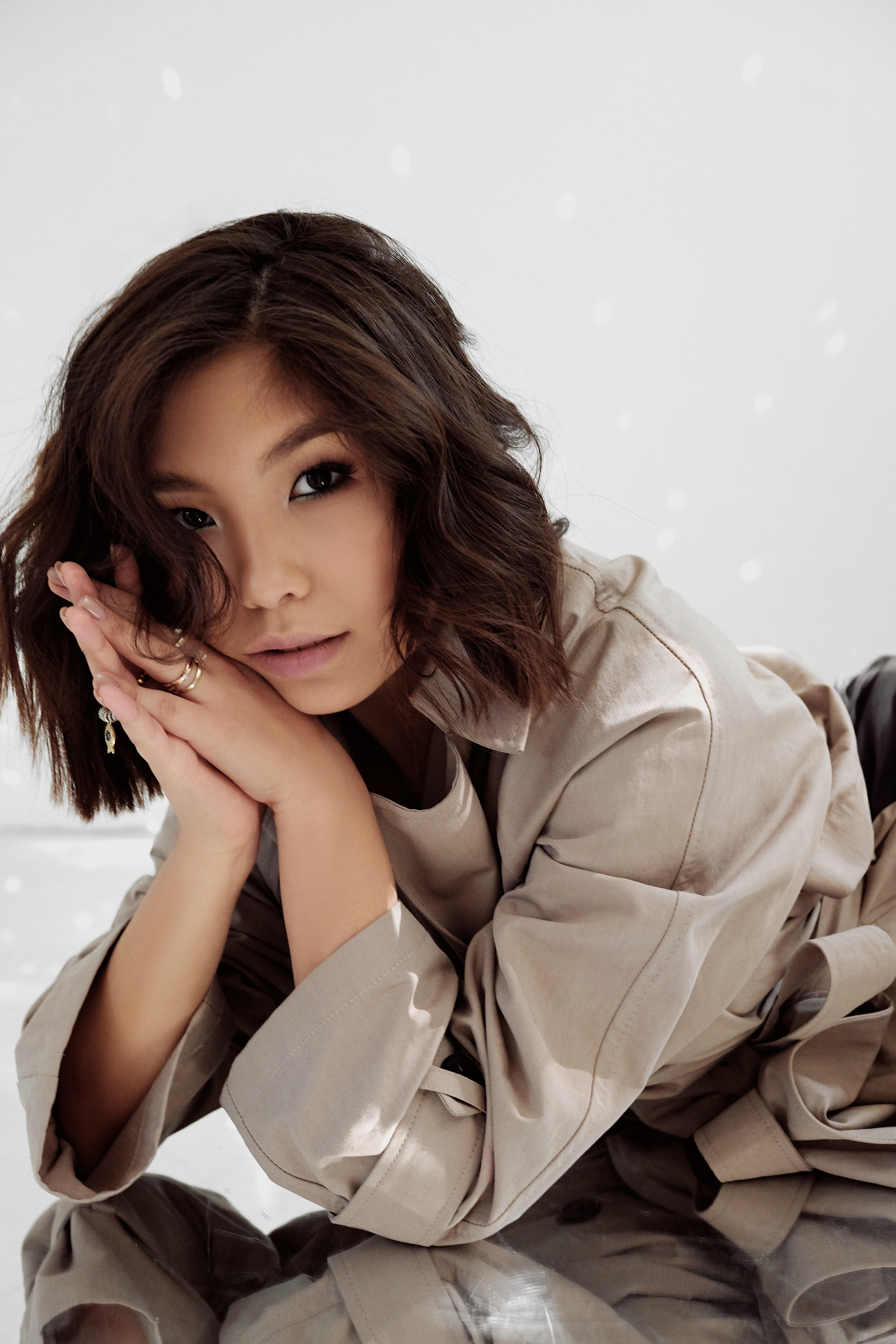

Background information
- Birth name: Aigerim Mergenbay
- Also known as: C.C.TAY
- Born: 17 April 2000 (age 24); Shymkent, Kazakhstan
- Genres: Pop
- Occupations: singer; actress
- Instruments: Vocals; piano; dombra
- Labels: UKCMUSIC

Aigerim Mergenbay (Kazakh: Әйгерім Мергенбай, Äigerım Mergenbai; born on April 17, 2000), known professionally as C. C. TAY, is a Kazakhstani singer and actress who is among the top five popstars of Kazakhstan. At the age of 5 years, she became the winner of the music contest “Aigölek” (Kazakh: Айгөлек). In 2018, she was invited to perform her debut single “Mümkin emes” (Kazakh: Мүмкін емес) in the gala concert at the Junior Eurovision Song Contest. Her first album "Tusimde Korem" reached number 3 on the iTunes Chart in Kazakhstan. The album track "Nege" was later used as the soundtrack of the web series "Suikimdi Stories". In 2018, she played the main role in Bayan Yessentayeva’s film “Sisitay.”
