= Tristar (band) =

- Origin: Almaty, Kazakhstan
- Genres: Pop, rap
- Years active: 1998–2002
- Past members: Inga Ruff; Sergei "Dr. Fox" Chik; Alina Mandrykina; Yulia Romanova; Elena Murushidi

Tristar (Russian: Тристар) was a local pop-rap band in Almaty, Kazakhstan formed in 1998.

The band was started by Inga Ruff and Alina Mandrykina, who worked together at the Almaty-based Channel 31 and the radio station of the same name. They had access to the resources of the station. Ruff's husband, Sergei "Dr. Fox" Chik, and the women recorded three songs at a home studio, made a music video and had the video and songs played on Channel 31. Their first performance sold out at one of the biggest dance clubs in Almaty where they sang five songs in the summer of 1998.

Dr. Fox said the group came up with its name after seeing a Korean electronic grill that happened to be at the right place at the right time. The group's first single "Уходи" ("Go Away") appeared on the radio first, then the video was made. "Одна" ("One"), the second single, became a hit right away.

It was hard to record an album, play concerts and work at the radio station. Ruff and Mandrykina left Channel 31. In January 1999, the band started filming a video for another song "Angel," which made its way to MTV Russia. On March 8, 1999, Tristar released their first album, "Игра" (Game). The first 10,000 copies sold out in a week in Almaty.

By the fall of 1999, there were conflicts between the band its producers. Ruff started working for Russian Radio Kazakhstan, which started a new period in Tristar's development. They filmed a video for a new song "Дорога" ("Road"), a ballad, which not all stations accepted to transmit. The band still toured at sold-out venues. Meanwhile, Mandrykina's left the group. Yulia Romanova, who had been a group's choreographer, took Mandrykina's place as a new member. In April 2000, Tristar came back on stage with their new member. Their second album, "Свет далёкой Англии" ("The Light of Distant England"), was released the same year. Elena Murushidi replaced Romanova in 2001.

== Discography ==
- Игра (Game) - 1999
- Свет далёкой Англии (The Light of Distant England) - 2000
- Третий (The Third) - 2002
- The Best - 2016
