= Torgay Region =

Former administrative division of Kazakhstan

Coordinates: 50°16′N 67°22′E

Torgay Region Торғай облысы
- Region of the Soviet Union, Kazakhstan
- 1970–1997
- Capital: Arkalyk
- History
  - Established: 23 November 1970
  - Disestablished: 1997
- Political subdivisions: districts

Torgay Region (also Turgay Region, Turgay Oblast, Kazakh: Торғай облысы, romanized: Torğai oblysy, Russian: Тургайская область, Turgayskaya Oblast) was an oblast (a first-level administrative and municipal unit) of the Kazakh Soviet Socialist Republic and of independent Kazakhstan from 1970 to 1988 and from 1990 to 1997. Its seat was in the city of Arkalyk. The region was located in the center of Kazakhstan, and its territory is currently divided between Kostanay and Akmola Regions.

== History ==
Turgay Region was established on 23 November 1970 on the lands that previously belonged to Kostanay and Tselinograd Regions. It was abolished in 1988 with its area going back to Kostanay and Tselinograd Oblasts, but was restored in 1990 along its same boundaries. It was again abolished in 1997 with its territory once again being split between its two predecessor regions.
