= Eldar Sattarov =

Kazakhstan writer

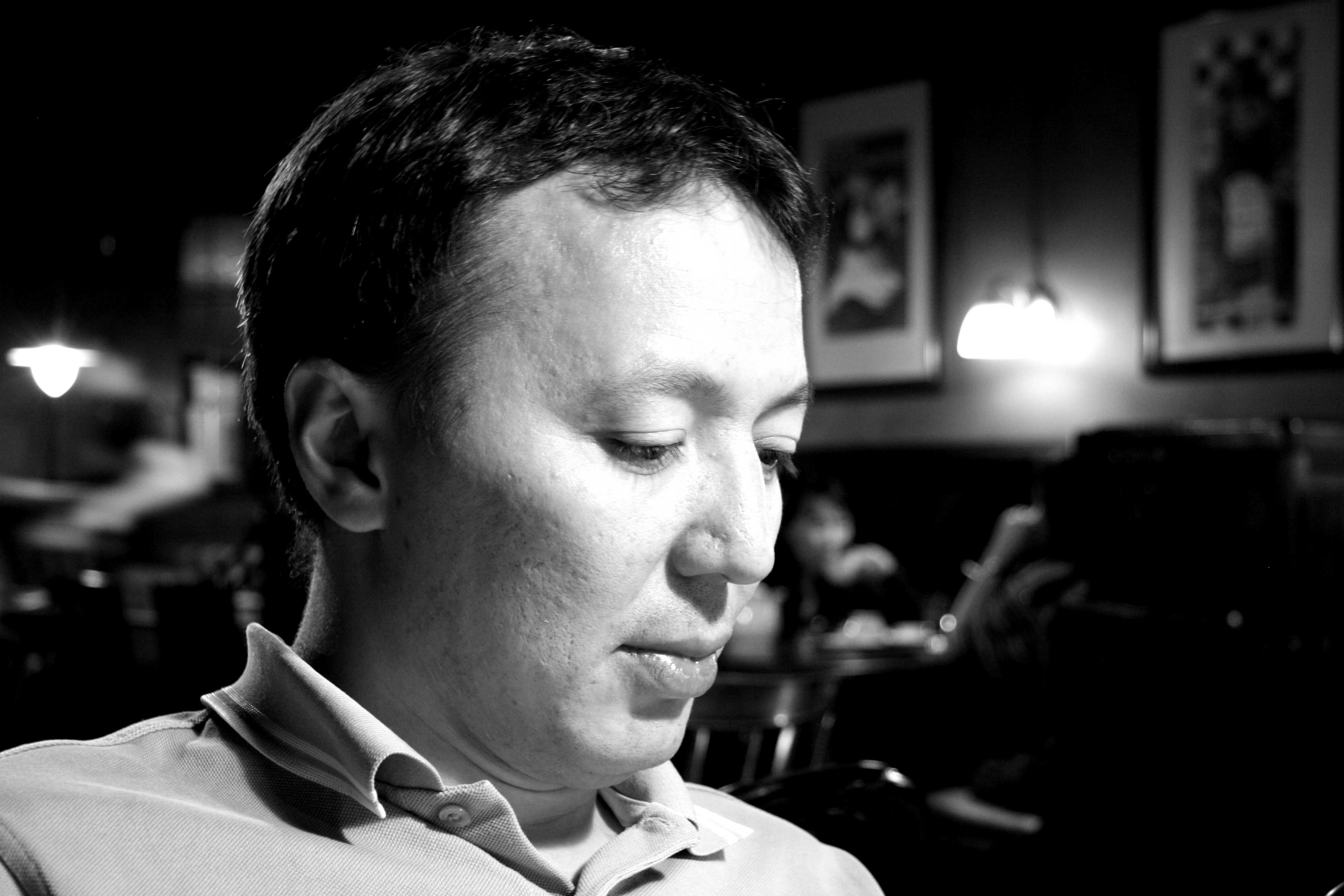
Eldar Sattarov

Eldar Sattarov is a writer from Kazakhstan.

== Early life ==
He was born in 1973 in Almaty to a Vietnamese father and a Tatar mother. In the early 1990s he sang in the first punk rock bands of his country. He worked in a factory.

== Career ==
He worked as a journalist, and started translating and writing in 2000. The books he translated from English, French, Spanish and Italian were published in Moscow and include authors such as Guy Debord, Raoul Vaneigem, Antonin Artaud, Francisco Ferrer, Giorgio Agamben, and Jacques Camatte.

Sattarov's first novel, Losing Our Streets, about teenage street gangs and drug addiction in the 1980s Almaty, published in 2010, was sold in Russia, Kazakhstan and Ukraine, generating positive feedback from literary critics and readers.

His second book, Transit. Saigon-Almaty, published in Kazakhstan in 2015 and later re-published in Russia under the title Chao Vietnam in 2018, was a historical novel about Indochina wars. It was short-listed for the National Bestseller award in Russia and took second place in the final, making Sattarov the first ever Central Asian author to enter the final of Russia's major literary award since the dissolution of the USSR.

His third novel The Thread of Time was dedicated to a journey of the left-wing idea in the twentieth century from Antonio Gramsci and Amadeo Bordiga through situationists and up to the author's personal meetings with Gilles Dauvé and Jacques Camatte, gained him a reputation of "Russia's Jello Biafra". The novel ends with a prophecy about "potential death of capital".

Sattarov also writes in English. His short story "Mountain Maid" was published in Singapore and UK, as a part of "Eurasian Monsters" collection edited by Margret Helgadottir. He lives in Kazan (Russia) and Almaty (Kazakhstan). In August 2022 Sattarov stated in his interview with the Kazakh channel Abai TV that in January of the same year he had signed a contract in Moscow for his fourth novel “The Stooges”, dedicated to the global oil & gas market, however its publication was suspended (as well as the first paper edition of a book by Jacques Camatte in Russian translated by Sattarov from French and contracted with the same publishing house) due to a crisis caused by the 2022 Russian invasion of Ukraine.

== See also ==
- Russian literature
