= Novaya Yunost =

Russian literary magazine founded in 1993

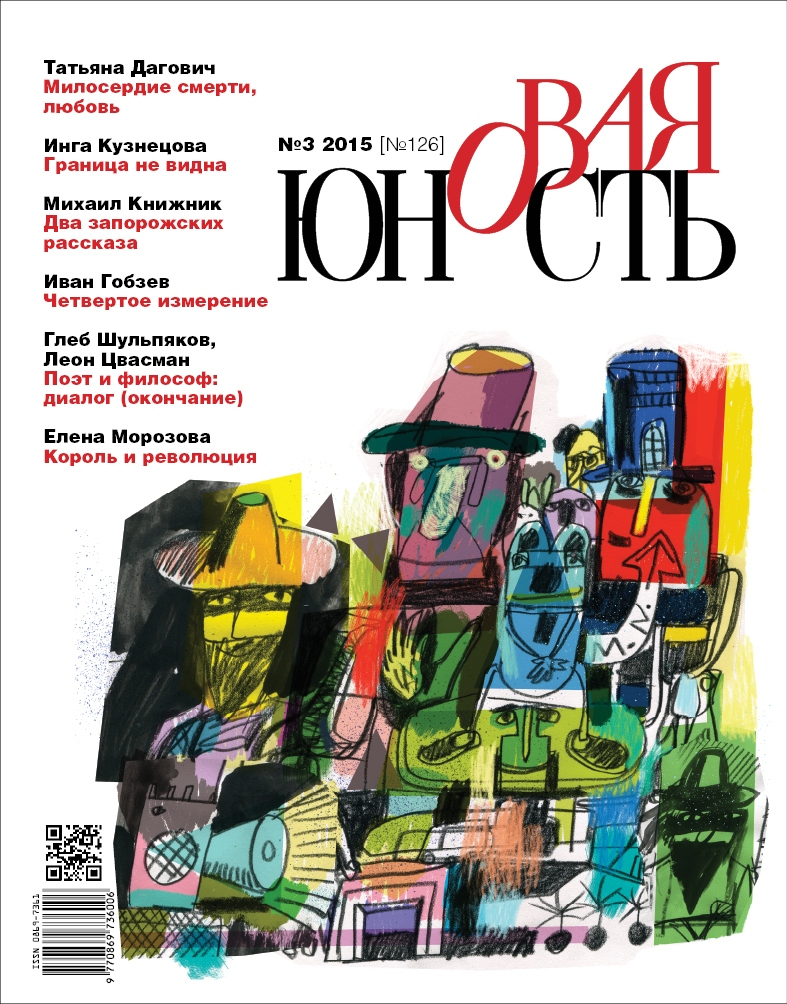
2015 edition of the magazine

Novaya Yunost (Новая Юность, New Youth) is a Russian literary magazine. It was founded in 1993. The founding chief editor was Alexander Tkachenko, who had previously been poetry editor of Novaya Yunost's predecessor Yunost. The headquarters of Novaya Yunost is in Moscow.
