= Juz Entertainment =

Kazakhstani record label

JUZ Entertainment
- Type: Private
- Industry: Entertainment
- Genre: Q-pop; Dance; EDM; Hip hop
- Founded: 2014
- Founder: Erbolat Bedelhan
- Headquarters: Almaty, Kazakhstan
- Services: Music production artist management
- Subsidiaries: Mooz Ice; Qazaq Generation Wear
- Website: http://juzent.com

Juz Entertainment (stylized as JUZ Entertainment) is a Kazakhstani record label and management agency established in 2014 by Kazakhstani singer Erbolat Bedelhan.

== History ==
JUZ Entertainment was established in 2014 by singer Erbolat Bedelhan, a member of Kazakhstani boy group Orda. The company debuted boy group Ninety One as its first artist in September 2015. In November 2018, the company debuted Alba, a former member of the pop band BN. In February 2019, the company signed rapper Ne1tron. On July 25, 2019, the company signed the top eleven contestants of the boy group reality show Project X as trainees, with three of them being confirmed to debut alongside Ne1tron in the upcoming boy group DNA. In August 2020, Ninety One member and leader AZ left the group and Juz Entertainment. In June 2021, Ne1tron left both DNA and Juz Entertainment. Later that month, Juz introduced Project X contender Tiny as the new member of the group. However, in September 2021, DNA disbanded and all the members left Juz Entertainment. Later that month, the five remaining Juz trainees from Project X left the company and debuted as members of the boy group Alpha, under Ten Label. On March 12, 2022, Juz Entertainment has announced that boy group Ninety One will be leaving the company and will continue activities independent of a label.

== Roster ==
=== Groups ===
- iONE!

=== Key people ===
- Erbolat Bedelhan – founder, executive producer
- Nursultan Bazarbay – director of photography
- Bibbota – fashion designer

=== Former artists ===
- Ninety One (2015–2022)
  - AZ (2015–2020)
  - Alem (2015–2022)
  - Ace (2015–2022)
  - Zaq (2015–2022)
  - Bala (2015–2022)
- Alba (2018-2022)
- DNA (2020–2021)
  - Ne1tron (2019–2021)
  - Ray (Anuar Gabiden) (2019–2021)
  - Pen (Daulet Zaidullayev) (2019–2021)
  - Ocean (Muhit Nurqul) (2019–2021)
  - Tiny (Nurdaulet Tilekqabyl) (2021)
- T'OI

== Discography ==
=== Albums ===
- Ninety One - Qarangy Zharyq (2017)
- AZ - Arameuzda Qalseun (2020)
- Zaq - Do Lot (2020)

=== EPs ===
- Ninety One - Aiyptama (2015)
- Ninety One - Dopamine (2019)
- Ninety One - Men Emes (2019)
- Alba - True Colors (2019)
- DNA - Teren (2020)
- Ninety One - 91 (2020)
- Orda - Juz (2023)

=== Compilation albums ===
- Orda - Orda Essentials (20 Years Anniversary) (2020)

== Concert tours ==
- JUZ Tour 2017 "Qarangy Zharyq" (Ninety One)
- JUZ Tour 2018 "DOPAMINE" (Ninety One)
- JUZ Tour 2019 "JUZ TOUR 2091: Sen Men Emes" (Ninety One, Alba, DNA)
