= Ninety One (group) =

Kazakh boy band

- Origin: Almaty, Kazakhstan
- Genres: Pop; Q-pop; EDM; pop-rap; K-pop
- Years active: 2015–present
- Members: Alem; Ace; Zaq; Bala
- Past members: A.Z.

Ninety One (Kazakh: Тоқсан бір, Toqsan bır, Korean: 나인티원) is a Kazakh boy group formed by Juz Entertainment in 2015. The band consists of four members: Alem, Ace, Zaq, and Bala. Once a five-member group, former member A.Z. left in 2020. Ninety One is the attributed as a pioneer act of Q-pop, a genre inspired by Western pop music and K-pop with Kazakh influences. The group was produced by Erbolat Bedelhan, a member of the Kazakh music unit Orda.

== History ==
=== 2014: KTI-boys ===
The group was founded in 2014, formed from the "K-Top Idols" project, the main goal of which was creating Kazakhstan's first idol group. A.Z. and Zaq were the winners of this project. Bala and Alem were cast via a separate audition. Ace joined the group after having trained at South Korean talent agency SM Entertainment from 2011 to 2015.

After a year and a half, the band decided to change their name from "KTI-boys" to "Ninety One"; a reference to 1991, the year in which Kazakhstan gained its independence from the Soviet Union. The name "91" carries the meaning of independence and creative freedom.

=== 2015–2017: Debut, touring, and 91 ===
On 1 September 2015, Ninety One released their debut single "Aiyptama!" ("Айыптама", "Don't judge!"). "Aiyptama" led the charts of Kazakhstan's music channels for 20 weeks. On 1 December 2015, they released their first Extended play (EP), also called Aıyptama, consisting of 6 songs. On 2 June 2016, they released a music video for the song "Qaitadan" (Again). The music video for "Qalay Qaraisyn" ("Qalai Qaraisyñ", "How do you feel about that?"), their third song, came out on 11 December 2016. It was included into the soundtrack of the movie "Гламұр для дур" directed by Askar Uzabaev. The song lasted 20 weeks on the 1st place of the Gákký chart.

Ninety One, despite developing a large fanbase, were met with hostility from the mainstream public. Make-up, earrings and dyed hair on men ran counter to traditional gender roles in Kazakhstan, and the group's style was considered to be counter to Kazakh culture. Apart from receiving various insults and death threats, the group also received physical threats.

On 21 June 2016, Ninety One held their first solo concert in the city of Karaganda as a part of their #91 tour; some previously planned concerts had been cancelled due to public outrage, with protesters impeding staff and the group members from entering the venues. From 23 July to 5 August, Ninety One toured China with Orda, their manager's group. They gave an interview for a Kazakh magazine "Xalhar". On 2 July 2017, Juz Entertainment announced Ninety One's second tour, titled JUZ Tour 2k17, which took them to more cities, without incident. "Mūz" (English: Ice/cold) came out on 21 August, as the official soundtrack for Ninety One's biographical movie 91. On 24 August, 91 was released; it showcases the difficulties the group has experienced, from their pre-debut to the backlash they received from the general public. On its premiere weekend, 91 grossed 32,672,000 tenge.

=== 2018–2019: "Dopamine" album ===
On 25 June 2018 Ninety One released "E.Yeah", the lead single from their album Dopamine. It was followed by "All I need" released on 8 August. The third song of the album, "Boyman", came out on 24 October 2018. "Boyman" said to be a tribute to a Kazakh figure skater Denis Ten, who had recently died. On 15 March 2019, Ninety One made a guest appearance on the South Korean musical game show I Can See Your Voice. The group won the show and got to perform with K-pop group Mamamoo. At the end of the show, they also performed their debut song "Aiyptama".

=== 2020–present: Hiatus and return to music ===
In September 2025, Ninety One released "Iya Iya", their first group release after a creative break to focus on solo and personal endeavours.

== Public image and impact ==
Ninety One has made a huge impact on the Kazakh language. Despite receiving recommendations to switch to English or Russian, members of Ninety One opt to use Kazakh to promote their country's culture and language. Ninety One have also made a major impact on Kazakh culture. Q-pop is considered to be one of the most major music genres by youth in Kazakhstan. The term "Q-pop" incorporates "Q" from the way country's name, "Qazaqstan", is converted to the Latin script in Kazakh.

A documentary film by Katherine Suvorova, Men sen emes Петь свои песни looks into the reasons behind protests against the group and cancellations of their concerts. These events reveal a huge layer of social and cultural conflicts inside the Kazakhstani society - conflict between the urban and rural life, between traditionalism and globalization, between the vertical line of political authority and personal freedom. Suvorova explores these themes through conversations with the band members themselves, their opponents and supporters. Kazakhstani political and cultural scientists, media experts and art historians also explain why do people of Kazakhstan protest against Q-pop.

Erbolat Bedelhan, with the help of a Kazakh TV channel NTK, decided to create Kazakhstan's first rap show. On 25 May 2018, a promotional video was released for Qara beri. Two members of Ninety One - Zaq and A.Z were mentors on the show.

On 29 March 2018, member Zaq gave a speech on the youth party Zhas Otan, of which he is a member.

== Members ==
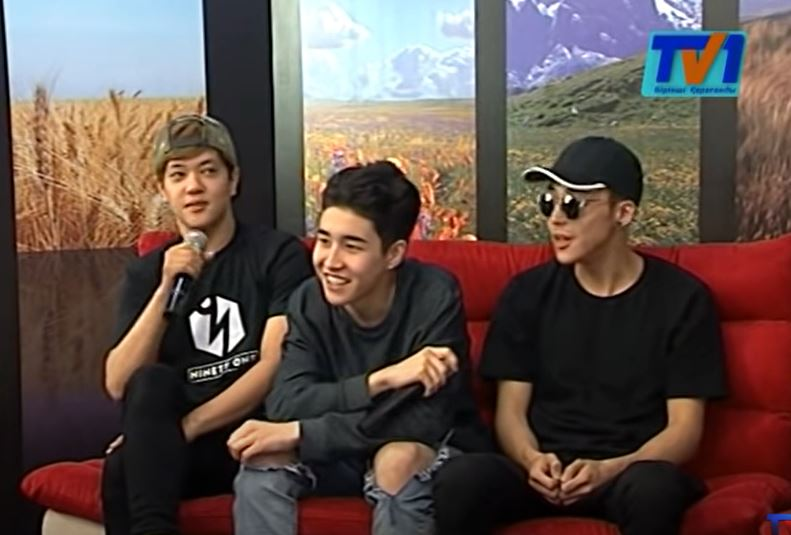
Ace, Bala, and A.Z. during a talkshow in 2016

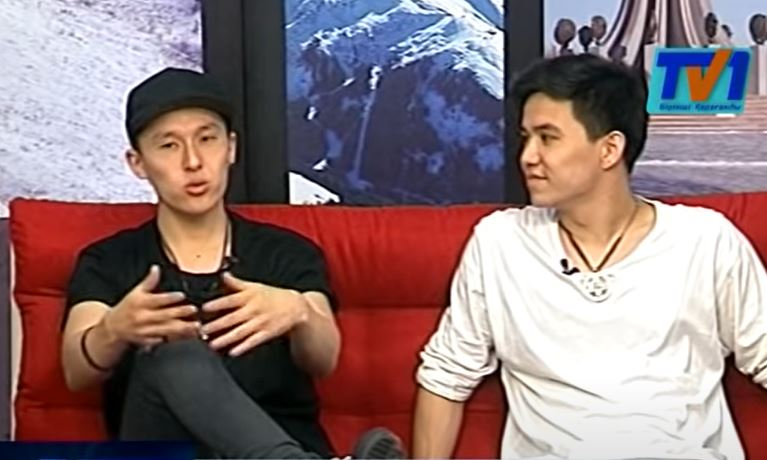
Zaq and Alem during a talkshow in 2016

=== Current ===
- Alem (Batyrhan Abaiūly Mälıkov; Батырхан Абайұлы Мәлікoв)
- Ace (Azamat Qairatūly Aşmaqyn; Азамат Қайратұлы Ашмақын)
- Zaq (Dulat Bolatūly Mūhametqali; Дулат Болатұлы Мұхаметқали)
- Bala (Daniar Aqylbaiūly Qūlymşin; Данияр Ақылбайұлы Құлымшин)

=== Former ===
- A.Z. (Azamat Baibulatūly Zenkaev; Азамат Байбyлатұлы Зенкаев)

== Discography ==
=== Studio albums ===
Title	Details
Qarangy Zharyq 2k17	Released: 5 May 2017; Label: JUZ Entertainment; Formats: Digital download, CD, streaming; Track listing: Ah! Yah! Mah!; Bayau; Bungingi Kunnen; MBBABBD; Mooz; Lya; O_o; Sau; Su Asty; Yeski Taspa Bii'

=== Extended plays ===
Title	Details
Aiyptama (Айыптама)	Released: 1 December 2015; Label: JUZ Entertainment; Formats: Digital download, CD, streaming; Track listing: Qalai Qaraisyn?; Ayiptama; Qaitadan; Umytpa; Qayirli Tun
Dopamine	Released: 10 January 2019; Label: JUZ Entertainment; Formats: Digital download, streaming; Track listing: E.YEAH; ALL I NEED; BOYMAN; WHY'M
Men Emes	Released: 20 August 2019; Label: JUZ Entertainment; Formats: Digital download, streaming; Track listing: Men Emes; Bári Biled; Køılek; Olar
91	Released: 6 October 2020; Label: JUZ Entertainment; Formats: Digital download, streaming; Track listing: Oinamaqo; Señorita - Tekketekke; Shyda; Nice Weather; Taboo (ft. Irina Kairatovna)

=== Singles ===
Title	Year	Album
"Aiyptama"	2015	Aiyptama
"Qaitadan"	2016	Aiyptama
"Qalai Qaraisyń?"	2016	Aiyptama
"Umytpa"	2016	Aiyptama
"Su Asty"	2017	Qarangy Zharyq
"Yeski Taspa Bii"	2017	Qarangy Zharyq
"Bayau"	2017	Qarangy Zharyq
"Mooz"	2017	Qarangy Zharyq
"Ah!Yah!Mah!"	2017	Qarangy Zharyq
"E.Yeah"	2018	Dopamine
"All I Need"	2018	Dopamine
"Boyman"	2018	Dopamine
"Why'm"	2019	Dopamine
"Lady"	2019	Non-album single
"Ayiptama" (Remastered ver.)	2019	I Can See Your Voice Korea Season 6 OST
"Men Emes"	2019	Men Emes
"Bári Biled"	2019	Men Emes
"Køılek"	2019	Men Emes
"Olar"	2019	Men Emes
"Lie"	2020	Non-album single
"Qiyalman"	2021	Non-album single
"T'nda"	2021	Saturday Tune Season 1
"Abuse"	2021	Saturday Tune Season 1
"Don't Dig It"	2021	Saturday Tune Season 1
"The Wings" (Note: It was later edited to "Darn")	2021	Saturday Tune Season 1
"Darn"	2021	Non-album single
"Jurek"	2021	Non-album single
"Intro"	2021	Saturday Tune Season 2
"Bópe"	2022	Saturday Tune Season 2
"1Dei"	2022	Saturday Tune Season 2
"Qooma"	2022	Saturday Tune Season 2
"R" (Outro)	2022	Saturday Tune Season 2
"Bata"	2022	Non-album single
"Suraqtar"	2022	Non-album single
"Bope"	2022	Non-album single

== Videography ==
Music videos

Title	Year
Aiyptama	2015
Qaitadan	2016
Qalai Qaraisyn?	2016
Su Asty	2017
Yeski Taspa Bii'	2017
Bayau	2017
Mooz	2017
Ah!Yah!Mah!	2017
E.YEAH	2018
All I Need	2018
Why'm	2019
Men Emes	2019
Bári Biled	2019
Señorita - Tekketekke	2020
Oinamaqo	2020
Taboo (ft. Irina Kairatovna)	2020
Qiyalman	2021
DARN	2021
Bata	2022
