= Ulytau District =

Coordinates: 48°03′N 65°39′E

Ulytau Ұлытау ауданы Ūlytau audany
- District
- Ұлытау ауданы
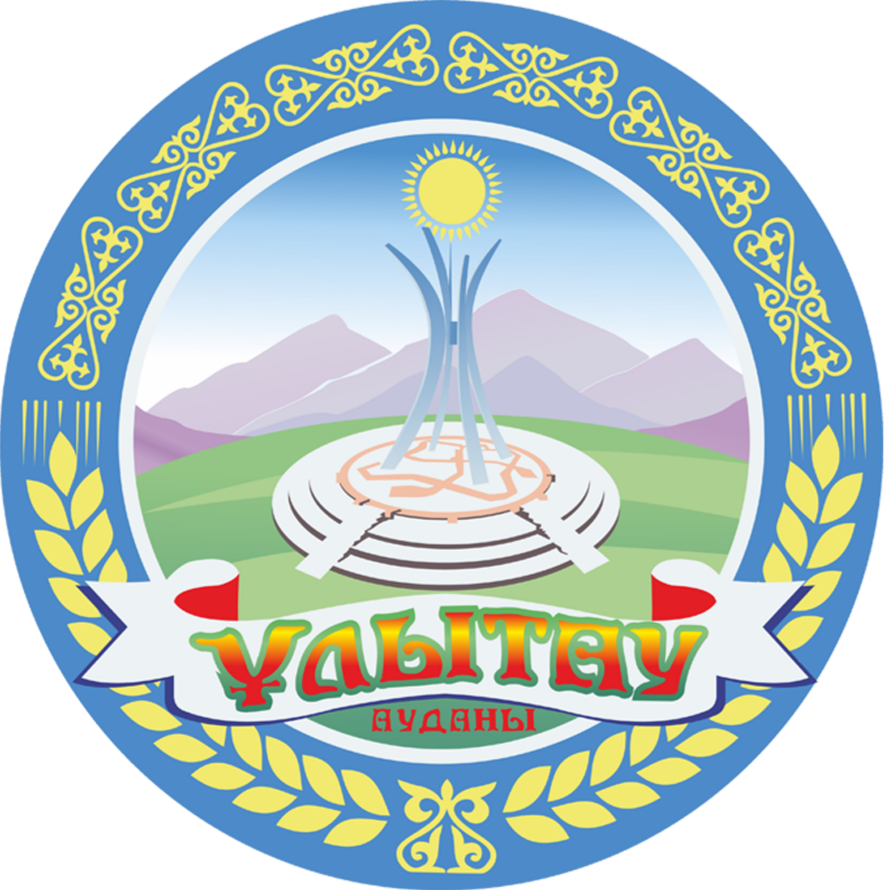
- Seal

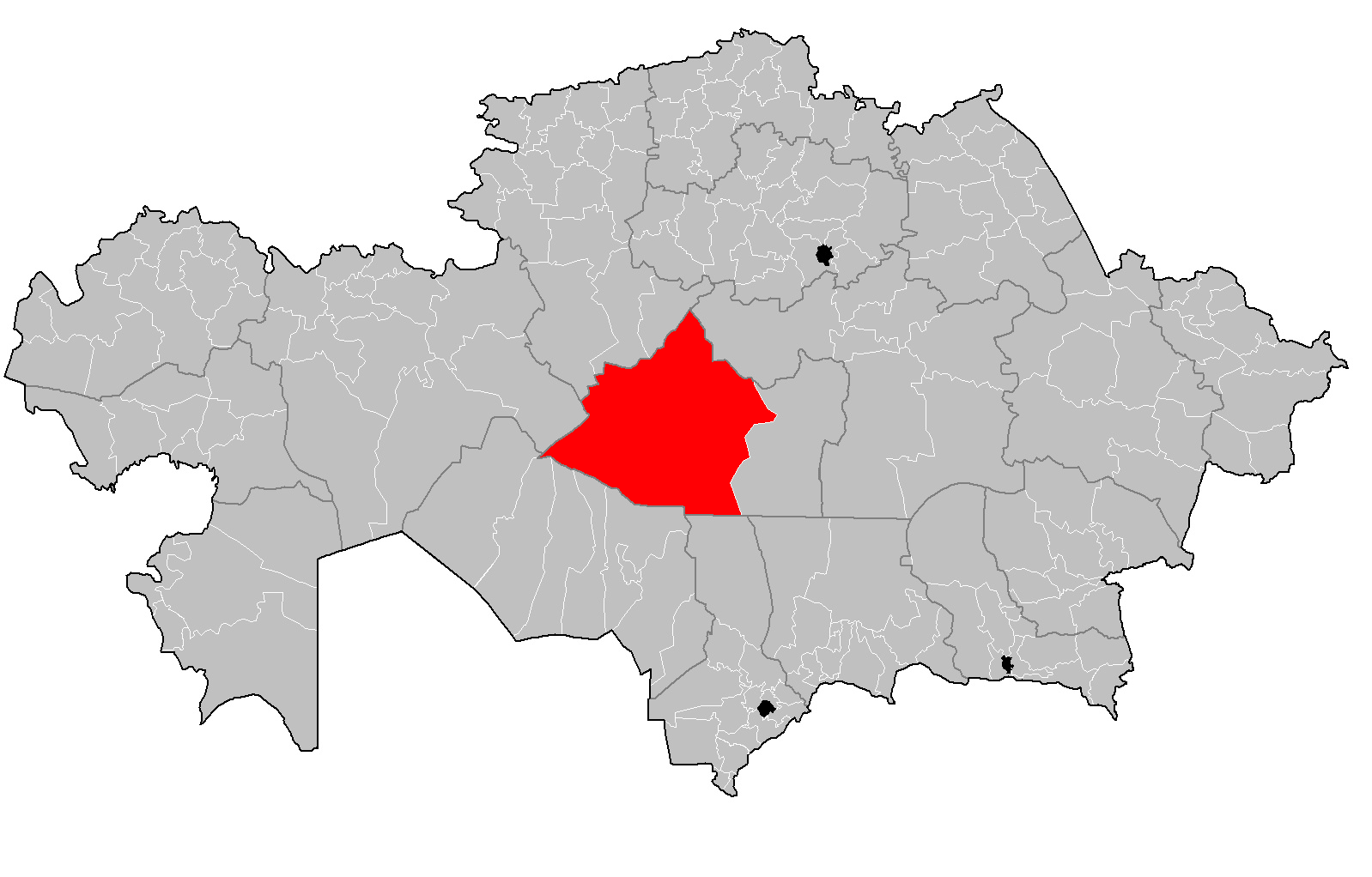
- Country: Kazakhstan
- Region: Ulytau Region
- Administrative center: Ulytau

Government
  - Akim: Medebaev Sovetbek Tursynovich

Area
  - Total: 46,986 sq mi (121,694 km^{2})

Population (2013)
  - Total: 13,909
- Time zone: UTC+6 (East)

Ulytau District (Kazakh: Ұлытау ауданы, Ūlytau audany) is a district of Ulytau Region in central Kazakhstan. The administrative center of the district is the village of Ulytau. Population: 13,909 (2013 estimate); 14,240 (2009 census results); 20,430 (1999 census results).

== Geography ==
The Ulytau, a subrange of the Kazakh Uplands, extends across part of Ulytau District. River Karakengir and lakes Karakoin and Meshkeysor are located in the district.
