= Kurmangazy Sagyrbaev =

Kazakh musician

Kurmangazy Sagyrbayuly
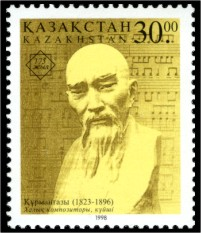
- 1998 Kazakhstan stamp, for the 175th anniversary of his birth
- Born: 1823; Zhideli village, Bokey Orda District, West Kazakhstan Region
- Died: 1896 (aged 72–73); Astrakhan, Russian Empire
- Citizenship: Bukey Horde
- Occupation: Composer
- Notable work: "Sary-Arqa"

Kurmangazy Sagyrbayuly (Kazakh: Құрманғазы Сағырбайұлы, Qūrmanğazy Sağyrbaiūly; 1823–1896) was a Kazakh composer, instrumentalist (kobyz, dombra), and folk artist. He influenced Kazakh musical culture. He was born in 1823 in the Bukey Horde (now Zhanakala District, West Kazakhstan Region). He is buried in the Astrakhan region of Lower Volga in today's Russian Federation.

== Legacy ==
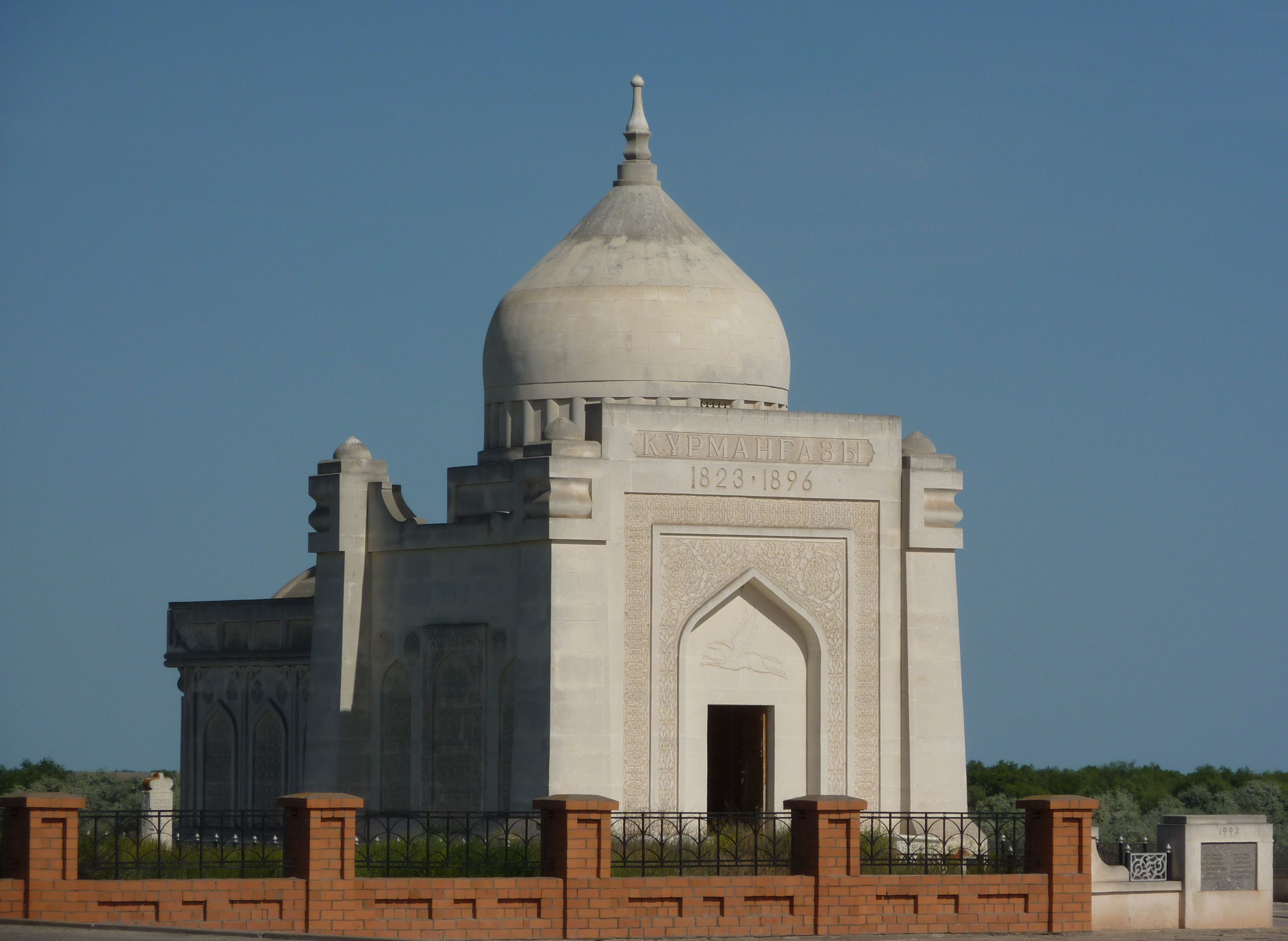
Sagyrbaev's mausoleum

In 1993, Sagyrbaev's image has been used on the 5 Kazakhstani tenge banknote, and on a Khazakh stamp in 1998.

The Kazakh National Conservatory is officially named after Kurmangazy.
