= Dombra =

Long-necked musical string instrument

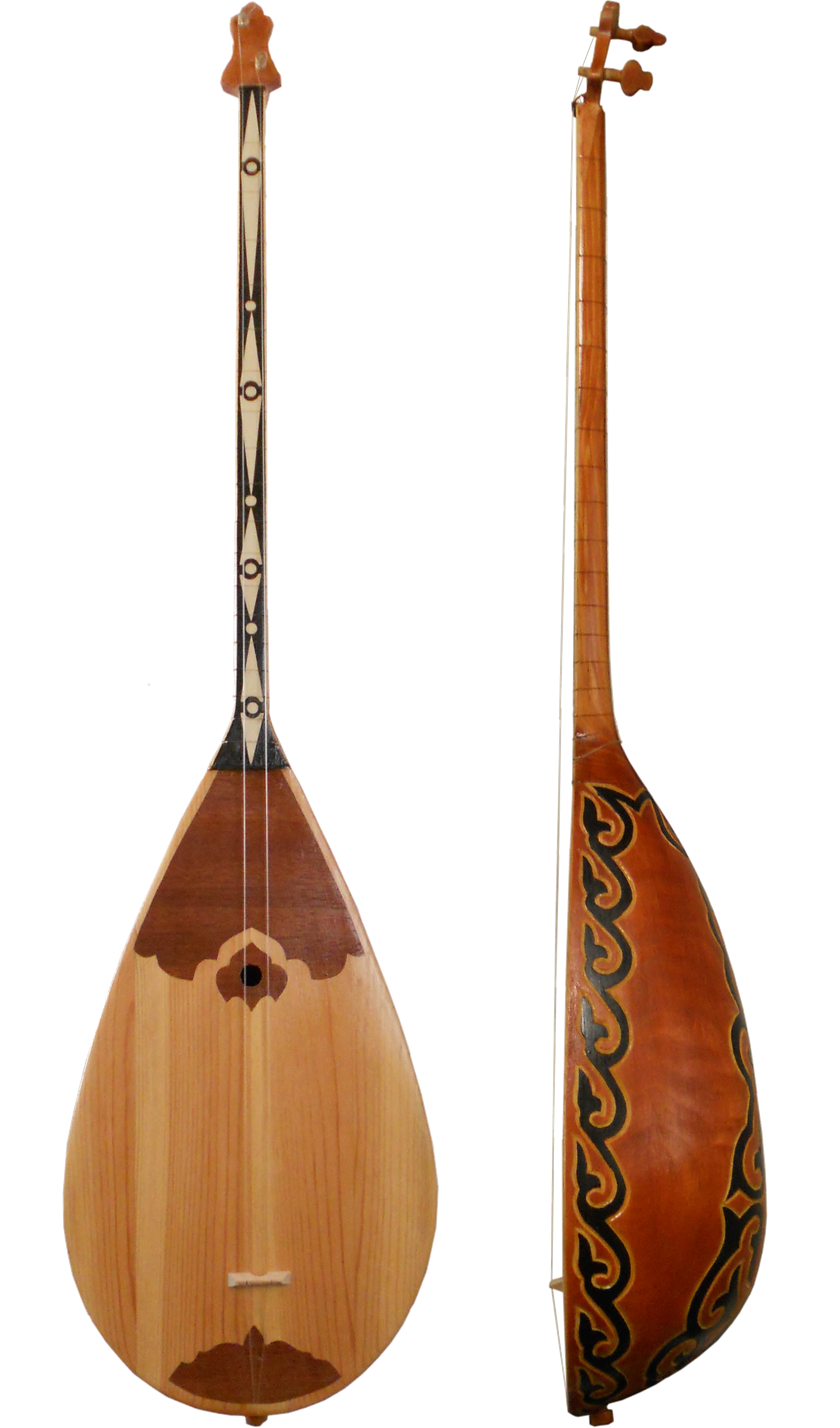
- Kazakh dombra

String instrument
- Classification: Plucked string instrument

Related instruments
- Komuz, dutar

The dombra, also known as the dombyra (Kazakh: домбыра, dombyra; Persian: دمبوره, dambūra), is a long-necked, plucked lute used in the traditional music of the Kazakhs, Hazaras, Uzbeks, Tajiks, Nogais, Bashkirs and Tatars, and the principal national instrument of Kazakhstan. Together with the bowed fiddle qyl-qobyz, it is one of the two most widely recognised symbols of Kazakh musical culture.

== Etymology and names ==
The instrument's name is most commonly transliterated as dombra in English, although the Kazakh form dombyra (домбыра) is also widely used in ethnomusicological writing. Cognate names occur in many of the Turkic languages and in neighbouring Iranian languages: the Afghan and Tajik forms are usually rendered dambura or damboora, the Bashkir form is dumbyra, and the related Uyghur instrument is the tanbur. All of these names are ultimately related to the Persian-Arabic ṭanbūr, a generic term for a long-necked lute attested in Middle Persian and used across the Middle East and Central Asia from at least the early medieval period.

== Construction ==
The standard Kazakh dombra has a pear-shaped or elongated triangular soundbox, a long thin neck and two strings. The soundbox is traditionally made from solid pieces of pine, spruce or apricot wood, with a thin flat or slightly arched soundboard; the back may be carved from a single block or assembled from staves bent and glued together. The neck carries a varying number of frets, originally made by tying gut or sinew around the neck and now usually made of nylon line or fixed metal. The strings, formerly made of sinew or twisted gut, are now most commonly nylon.

Two main soundbox profiles are distinguished in Kazakh organology: the broader, deeper pear shape associated with the western tökpe küy tradition, and the smaller, flatter triangular or shovel-shaped body associated with the eastern shertpe küy tradition. The Afghan Hazara, Turkestani and Badakhshani damburas differ in being fretless, with the body and neck carved from a single block of wood, most often mulberry or apricot; the soundboard is thick wood with a small sound hole at the back rather than the front, and the instrument is typically left unvarnished and undecorated apart from inlay or pyrography.

== Tuning and playing technique ==
The most commonly cited concert tuning for the Kazakh dombra prima is the perfect fourth D-G, with the lower string usually carrying the drone and the upper string the melody, although the strings are often retuned to a fifth, octave or other interval to suit a particular küy or regional style. Eight to nine frets are standard on instruments used to accompany song forms such as jir, while instruments used for the more elaborate küy repertoire usually carry between eighteen and twenty-four frets.

Two principal right-hand techniques are distinguished. Tökpe (literally "pouring") is the strumming technique associated with the western Kazakh tradition, in which both strings are sounded together with rapid alternating downward and upward strokes of the fingers. Shertpe ("flicking") is the plucking technique associated with the eastern and central traditions, in which the strings are sounded individually with the fingertips and nails for a more lyrical, less percussive sound. In both traditions, the player may also tap the soundboard with the fingers for percussive accent.

== History ==
A long-necked, two-stringed plucked lute closely resembling the dombra is described in the music-theoretical writings of Al-Farabi (c. 872 – c. 950), who lists a ṭunbūr of the Khorasan and Baghdad regions in his Kitab al-Musiqa al-Kabir (Great Book of Music). Similar instruments are attested in archaeological and pictorial evidence across the steppe and oasis cultures of Central Asia from the medieval period onward.

The classical Kazakh dombra repertoire took shape in the eighteenth and nineteenth centuries with the emergence of a generation of named composer-performers, or küyshi, whose works were transmitted orally from master to apprentice. The most influential figures include Kurmangazy Sagyrbaiuly (c. 1823-1896) and Daulet-Kerey Shyghaiuly (1820-1887) of the western tökpe school, and Tattimbet Kazangapuly (1815-1862) and Toka Shonmanuly (1830-1914) of the eastern shertpe school.

== The küy tradition ==
The dombra's core repertoire is the küy (also spelled kui), a short solo instrumental composition, typically of two to four minutes, that combines through-composed and improvised elements. Each küy is associated with a story, legend or emotional state that the performer is expected to introduce verbally to the audience before playing. The art of Kazakh dombra küy was inscribed on UNESCO's Representative List of the Intangible Cultural Heritage of Humanity in 2014, at the ninth session of the Intergovernmental Committee, in recognition of its role in transmitting Kazakh historical memory and identity.

Kazakh musicology identifies several regional küy schools, each centred on a major historical performer. The most thoroughly documented are the western tökpe schools associated with Kurmangazy and Daulet-Kerey, and the eastern and central shertpe schools associated with Tattimbet, Toka, Sügir and Dairabai. Among Mongolian Kazakhs and Kazakh diaspora communities in China and Mongolia, a regional Altai-style küy tradition has been documented in detail by the ethnomusicologist Saida Daukeyeva.

== Regional variants ==
The Afghan dambura, played principally by Hazara musicians in the central highlands of Afghanistan and by Tajik musicians in Badakhshan, is fretless and carved from a single block of mulberry or apricot wood, with two nylon or gut strings tuned typically to a fourth. A characteristic feature of Hazara dambura playing is the use of percussive tapping and slapping on the soundbox to provide rhythmic accompaniment to sung verse, including the long narrative poems of the Hazaragi tradition. The Afghan-Hazara repertoire is most widely associated with the singer-songwriter Dawood Sarkhosh.

The Bashkir dumbyra was historically used by sasans (epic singers) to accompany kubair verse and traditional poetic legends such as Zayatulyak and Hiuhiliu. Largely lost during the suppression of Bashkir rebellions in the eighteenth and nineteenth centuries, the instrument was reconstructed during the second half of the twentieth century in pear-shaped or oval form and revived for use in contemporary Bashkir folk music.

== Modern usage and cultural significance ==
The dombra is widely treated as a national emblem of Kazakhstan; the poet and composer Abay Qunanbaiuly is conventionally portrayed holding a dombra, and the instrument appears in state ceremony and on currency, postage and other official iconography. Since 2018, the first Sunday of July has been observed annually as National Dombra Day (Ұлттық домбыра күні), with mass public performances in Astana and other Kazakh cities involving thousands of players simultaneously.

An electrified version of the instrument, the electrodombra, was developed in the early 2010s and is played by the Kazakh folk-rock band Ulytau, who have brought the instrument to international rock and metal audiences. Recent decades have also seen a youth-driven revival, organised in part through the social-media-coordinated Dombyra Party flash-mob movement. Ethnomusicological research has also drawn attention to the strongly gendered character of professional dombra performance in Kazakhstan, where the küy tradition has historically been a predominantly male practice tied to ideals of patrilineal honour, hospitality and tribal memory.

== Gallery ==
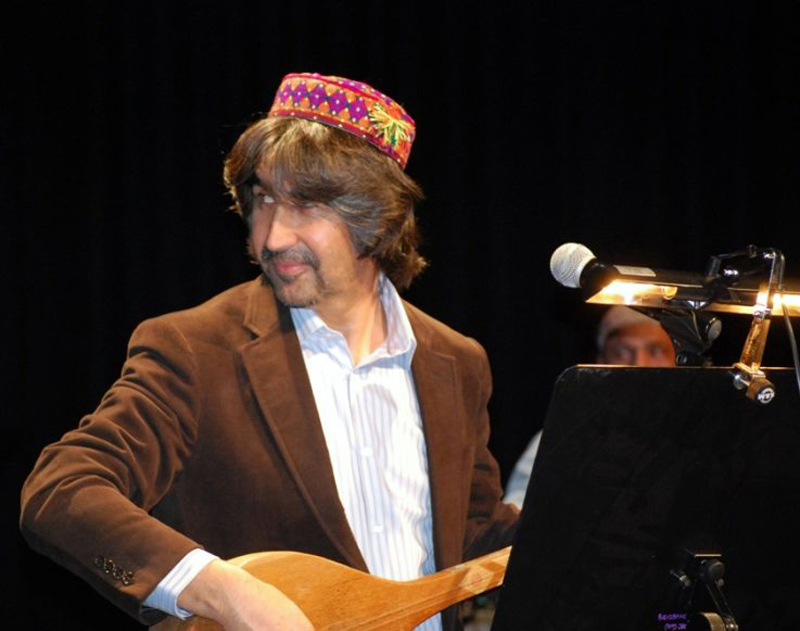
Dawood Sarkhosh, a Hazara Dombra player.

== See also ==
- Komuz
- Küy (music)
- Music of Kazakhstan
- Qyl-qobyz
- Tanbur
- Dutar
