= Ushana (village) =

Ushana Үшана
- Village
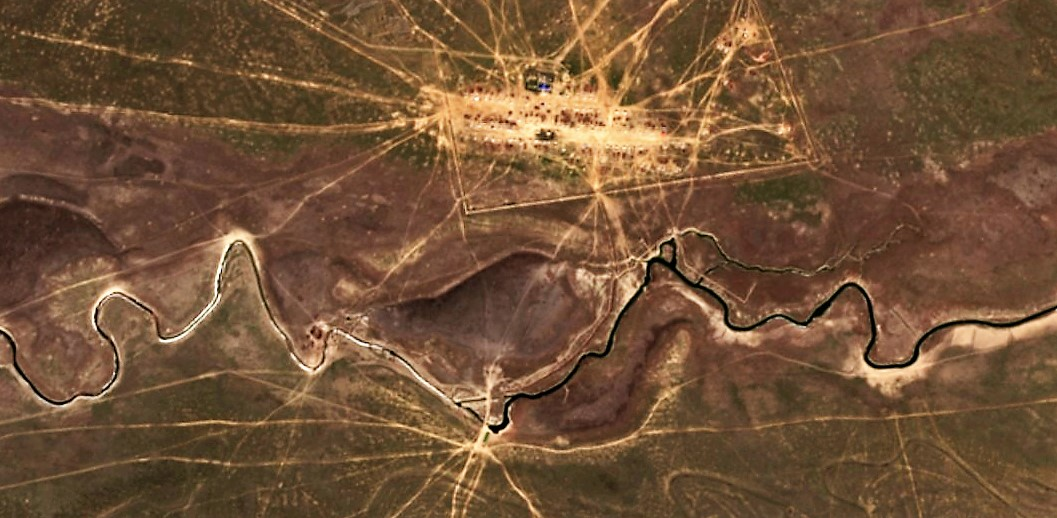
- The Kaldygaity meandering westwards south of Ushana Sentinel-2 image

- Location within Kazakhstan
- Coordinates: 49°27′07″N 52°57′14″E
- Country: Kazakhstan
- Regione: West Kazakhstan Region
- District: Karatobe District
- Rural District: Sulykol Rural District

Population (2009)
  - Total: 696
- Time zone: UTC+5 (UTC + 5)

Ushana (Kazakh: Үшана), until 1990 known as "Batpakkol", is a village in the Karatobe District, West Kazakhstan Region, Kazakhstan. It is part of the Sulykol Rural District (KATO code - 275049500). Population: 696 (2009 census results); 784 (1999 census results).

== Geography ==
Ushana is located by the Kaldygaity river, east of Tolen village. It lies 47 kilometers (29 mi) southwest of Karatobe.
