= Tuzdy =

- Тұзды
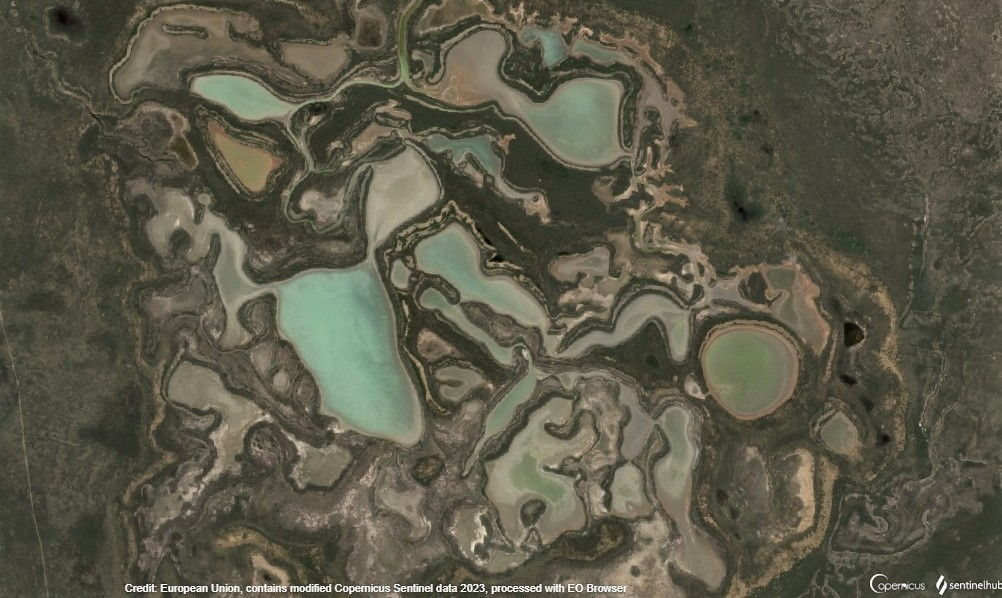
- Close up of the lake Tuzdy cluster central part Sentinel-2 image.

- Location within Kazakhstan
- Location: Caspian Lowland
- Coordinates: 49.6183°N 52.3035°E
- Type: salt lake
- Primary inflows: Zhylandy (Olenti)
- Basin countries: Kazakhstan
- Max. length: 8.6 kilometers (5.3 mi)
- Max. width: 7.2 kilometers (4.5 mi)
- Surface area: ca 70 square kilometers (27 sq mi)
- Surface elevation: 7 meters (23 ft)

Tuzdy (Kazakh: Тұзды) is a salt lake cluster in Akzhaik District, West Kazakhstan Region, Kazakhstan.

The lake group lies 40 kilometers (25 mi) northeast of Bazartobe, a village by the banks of the Ural river, and 27 kilometers (17 mi) northwest of Tolen.

== Geography ==
The lake cluster is 8.6 kilometers (5.3 mi) long and 7.2 kilometers (4.5 mi) wide. It is part of the Ural River basin. The lake group is fed by snow, as well as groundwater. The individual lakes have very indented shores and may become a single lake during heavy spring floods. In the summer the lakes are mostly dry.

River Olenti flows from the north but doesn't reach the lake group. The Zhylandy, a short river, begins a little to the southeast from where the Olenti disperses in the sand. It flows southwards and reaches the northern tip of the Tuzdy. To the south and southeast stretches the wide lake area that lies at the end of river Kaldygaity, near Tolen village.

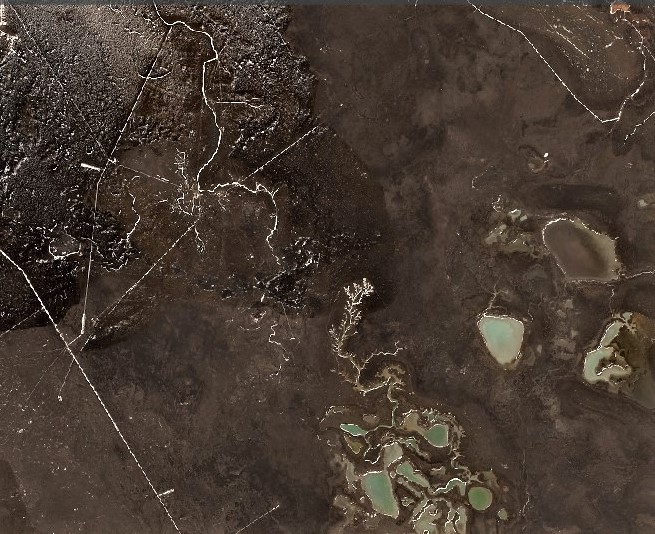
Final stretch of river Olenti (upper left) with the Zhylandy and lake Tuzdy (lower right) Sentinel-2 image.

== See also ==
- List of lakes of Kazakhstan
- Sor (geomorphology)
