= Nariman Turegaliyev =

Kazakh politician (born 1964)

Nariman Töreğaliev
- Нариман Төреғалиев
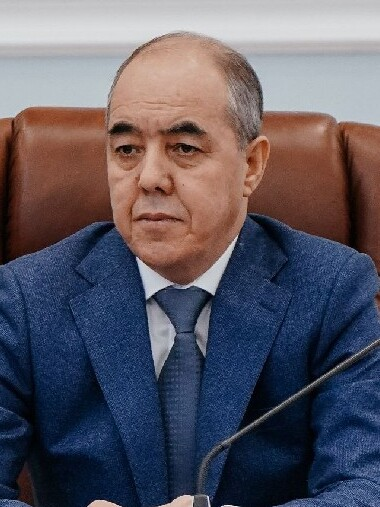
- Töreğaliev in 2026

Äkim of West Kazakhstan Region
- Incumbent
- Assumed office 2 December 2022
- President: Kassym-Jomart Tokayev
- Preceded by: Ğali Esqaliev

Senator for West Kazakhstan Region
- In office 30 June 2017 – 2 December 2022 Serving with Erbolat Muqayev and Lyazzat Rysbekova
- Preceded by: Rashit Akhmetov
- Succeeded by: Arman Utegulov

Akim of Oral
- In office 5 April 2016 – 30 June 2017
- Preceded by: Altai Kölgınov
- Succeeded by: Murat Muqayev

Personal details
- Born: 19 July 1964 (age 62) Esensai, Taipaq, West Kazakhstan Region, Kazakh SSR, Soviet Union
- Party: Amanat
- Spouse: Laila Dauletbayeva
- Children: 2
- Education: Dzhambul Hydromelioration and Construction Institute; Caspian University
- Awards: Order of Kurmet

Military service
- Allegiance: Soviet Union
- Branch/service: Soviet Army
- Years of service: 1982–1984
- Rank: Senior lieutenant (reserve)

Nariman Töreğaliev (Note: Often transliterated as Nariman Turegaliev through a Russified Romanization of Нариман Турегалиев.) (Kazakh: Нариман Төреғалиев; born 19 July 1964) is a Kazakh lawyer and politician serving as the akim of West Kazakhstan Region since 2022. He previously served as the member of Senate from 2017 to 2022 and akim of Oral from 2016 to 2017.

== Early life and education ==
Nariman Turegaliyev was born on July 19, 1964, in Esensai, a village in Taipaq District (now Akzhaik District), West Kazakhstan Region, Kazakh Soviet Socialist Republic, Soviet Union (now Kazakhstan). Nariman has no patronymic, and his surname is derived from his father's given name, Turegali, which is atypical for East Slavic naming traditions.

In 1990, he graduated from the Dzhambul Hydromelioration and Construction Institute (now Taraz University) with a degree in engineering and economics. Later, he earned a law degree from the Caspian University in 2004.

== Early career ==
Turegaliyev began working in 1981, at age 17 as a laborer at the Esensaysky state farm in his native village. At 18 (1982) he was conscripted for active military service and served in a unit of the Soviet Army stationed in the Hungarian People's Republic, returning in 1984. He holds the military rank of reserve senior lieutenant.

After graduating from the Dzhambul Hydromelioration and Construction Institute, he worked in Uzynkol, village in Terektinsky District: first as an economist and, from 1995, as chief economist of the agricultural association named after ХVІІІ Partsyezd. In the same year he was employed in a private farm in that locality. In 1997, he joined the Aityevo production complex as chief economist while also handling procurement duties. Two years later he became director of the Akzhol peasant farm.

In 2001, he was appointed head of the District Department of Labour and Social Protection.

A year later he was named director of a general-type residential care home in the city of Oral.

In 2003, he transferred to the Department of Employment and Social Protection of West Kazakhstan Region and served as deputy head. After two years he moved to the Department for Coordination of Employment and Social Programmes in the same capacity.

On July 31, 2008, he was appointed head of the regional Department of the Agency for Regulation of Natural Monopolies. Two years later, on August 7, 2010, he became chief of the regional Office for Employment and Social Programmes.

== Political career ==
In 2012, he was appointed äkım (governor) of Akzhaik District.

On June 13, 2015, he was promoted to deputy akim of West Kazakhstan Region under Nurlan Nogayev.

Following Nogayev's departure, on April 5, 2016, he was appointed akim of Oral.

On June 28, 2017, he won the Senate election in West Kazakhstan Region, receiving 156 of 194 votes from local maslihat members. Having secured approximately 80.41% of the vote, he was officially registered as a senator for his native region by Central Election Commission resolution No. 18/167 on June 30, and subsequently resigned as city äkım. After the new session began, on 4 September he joined the Senate Committee on Social and Cultural Development and Science. In September 2020 he became secretary of that committee, and on 23 June 2022 senators elected him its chairman.

On December 2, 2022, the president Tokayev proposed candidates for the post of akim of West Kazakhstan Region, and the proposal was read by the head of the presidential administration, Murat Nurtileu. In the open vote among maslikhat deputies he received 123 votes while Bauyrzhan Aitmagambetov received 37, and by Tokayev's decree No. 33 Turegaliyev was appointed 9th akim of West Kazakhstan Region. The same day, the Central Election Commission terminated his senatorial mandate by resolution No. 116/610.

== Personal life ==
Turegaliyev is married to Laila Mendiyarqyzy Dauletbayeva. They have son and daughter.

== Awards ==
- Order of Kurmet (2016)
- Certificate of honor from the Council of the Interparliamentary Assembly of Member Nations of the Commonwealth of Independent States (2018)
