= Yesenankaty =

River in Kazakhstan

Yesenankaty Есенаңқаты
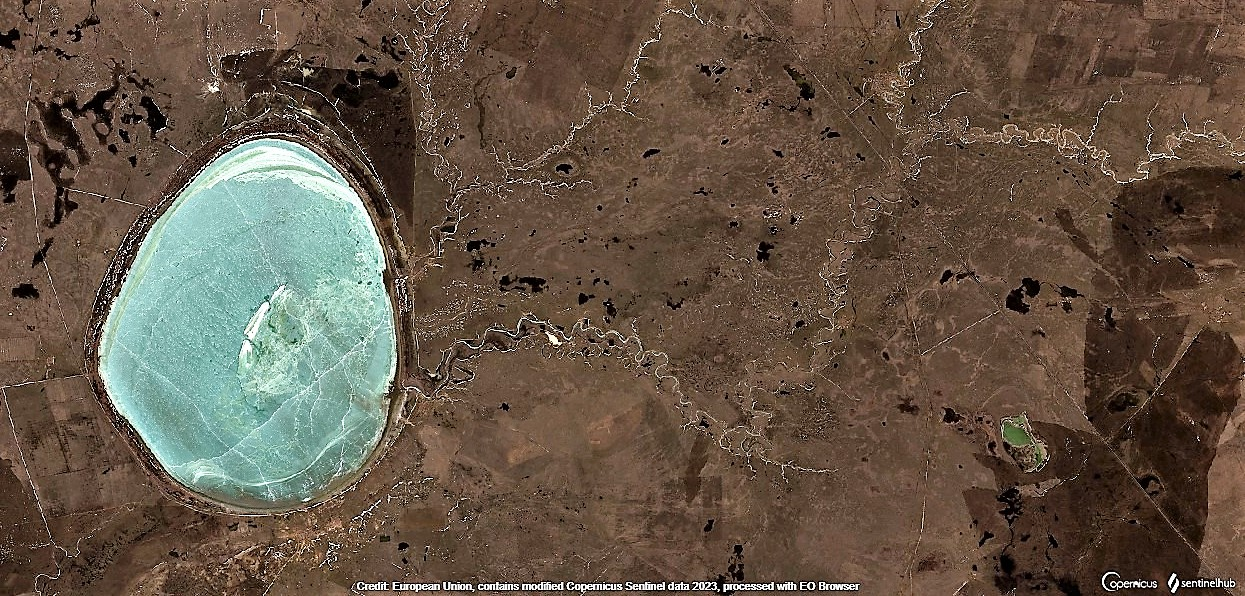
- Sentinel-2 image of the final stretch of river Yesenankaty (center).

- Mouth location in Kazakhstan

Location
- Countries: Kazakhstan

Physical characteristics
- Source
  - coordinates: 50°59′55″N 52°14′13″E
- Mouth: Shalkar
  - coordinates: 50°34′47″N 51°46′43″E
- Length: 130 km (81 mi)
- Basin size: 1,860 km^{2} (720 sq mi)
- Discharge
  - average: 0.14 cubic metres per second (4.9 cu ft/s)

The Yesenankaty (Kazakh: Есенаңқаты) is a river in Syrym District, West Kazakhstan Region, Kazakhstan. It is 130 kilometres (81 mi) long and has a catchment area of 1,860 square kilometres (720 sq mi).

The river is fed mainly by groundwater and rain. Its waters are used to irrigate agricultural fields.

== Course ==
The Yesenankaty has its sources on the northern slopes of an up to 190 m (620 ft) high ridge that runs parallel to the Shyngyrlau River. It heads roughly westwards, bending southwestwards in mid course. In its final stretch it bends northwestwards and again southwestwards. Finally it reaches lake Shalkar and enters it from the eastern shore.

The width of the river channel is between 20 m (66 ft) and 30 m (98 ft), the banks are flat. The main tributaries of the Yesenankaty are the 45 km (28 mi) long Kopirankaty and the 29 km (18 mi) long Ankaty.

== See also ==
- List of rivers of Kazakhstan
