= Akzhayik =

Akzhayik or Akzhaik can refer to:

- Akzhaik, Atyrau, village in Atyrau Region
- Akzhaik District in West Kazakhstan Region
- Akzhayik Nature Reserve, a biosphere reserve in West Kazakhstan Region, see World Network of Biosphere Reserves in Europe and North America
- Akzhayik Sports Club, bandy club from Oral, Kazakhstan
- FC Akzhayik, football club from Oral, Kazakhstan
