= Bayterek (disambiguation) =

Bayterek (Kazakh: Бәйтерек, romanized: Bäiterek) may refer to:

- Baiterek (monument), an observation tower in Nur-Sultan, capital of Kazakhstan
- Bayterek, Almaty Region, a small town in Almaty Region, Kazakhstan
- Bayterek District, former name: Zelenov, a district in Western Kazakhstan
- Baiterek Holding, key state-owned financial institution in Kazakhstan
