= Kushum =

River in Kazakhstan

Kushum Көшім
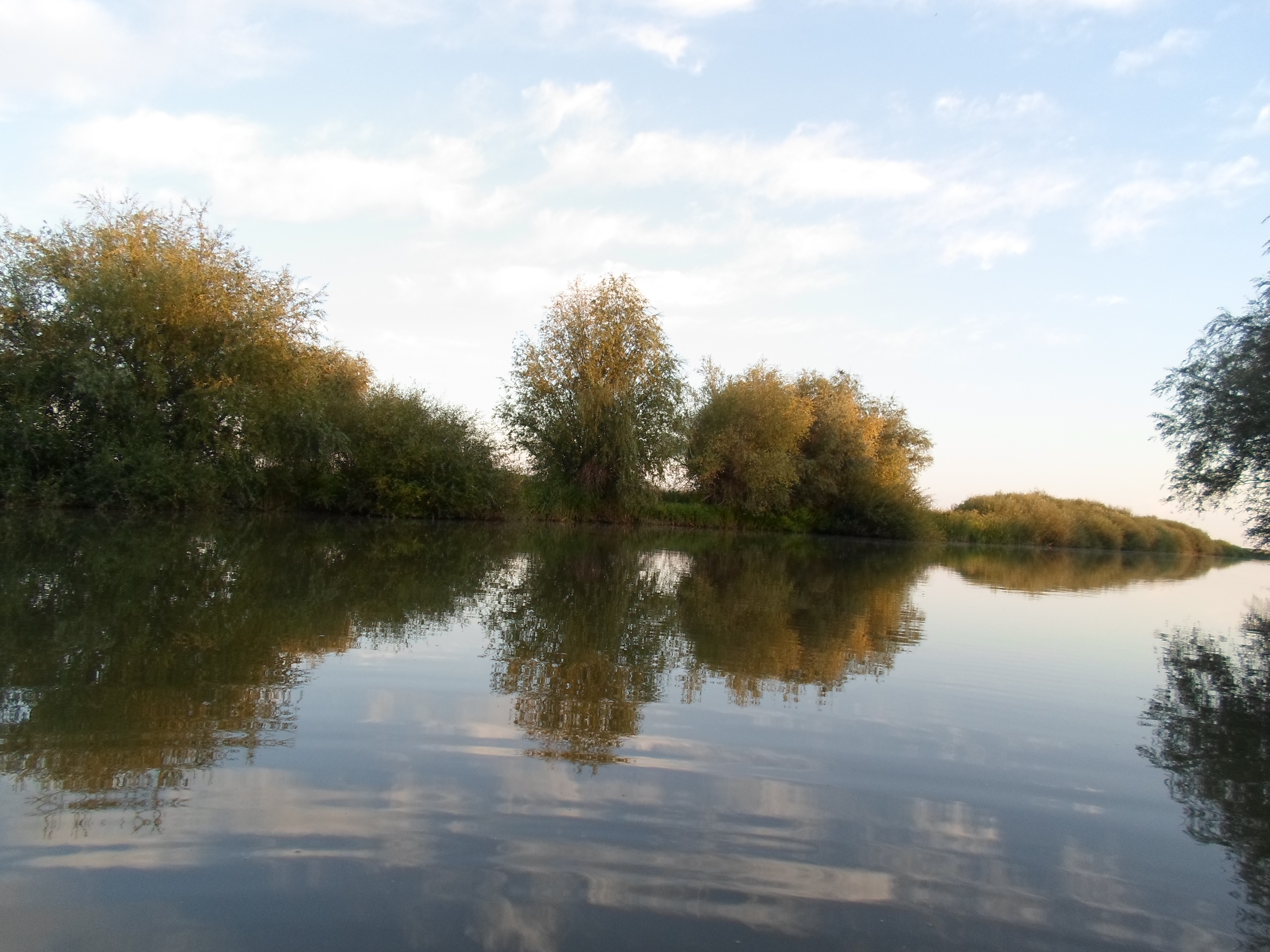
- Panorama of the river

- Mouth location in Kazakhstan

Location
- Countries: Kazakhstan

Physical characteristics
- Source: Ural near Krugloozyornoye
  - coordinates: 51°05′25″N 51°19′12″E
- Mouth: near lake Birkazan
  - coordinates: 49°12′33″N 50°20′47″E
- Length: 375 km (233 mi)
- Discharge
  - average: 4.4 cubic metres per second (160 cu ft/s)

The Kushum or Koshim (Kazakh: Көшім; Russian: Кушум) is a river in the West Kazakhstan Region, Kazakhstan. It is 375 kilometres (233 mi) long.

The Kushum is a distributary of the Ural river. It flows across the Bayterek, Akzhaik and Zhanakala districts. Its water is used for agricultural irrigation and the riverbanks as grazing ground for local cattle. The last stretch of the river, including the lakes adjoining it, is a 175,315 ha (433,210 acres) Important Bird Area.

== Course ==
The Kushum begins branching off the right side of the Ural river northeast of the village of Krugloozyornoye. It heads roughly southwards forming meanders and oxbow lakes. Its mouth is in lake Birkazan, near Zhanakala village, over 112 km (70 mi) west of the Ural river channel.

The right bank of the Kushum is bound by steep cliffs, while the left bank is mostly flat. The river is fed by snow, rain and groundwater. The Dongulyuk, Kirov, Pyatimar and Bitik reservoirs, as well as a network of irrigation canals were built along the Kushum river in the last half of the 20th century. Since the dams and canals were built the natural flow was disturbed and the water of the river does not reach lake Zhaltyrkol anymore.

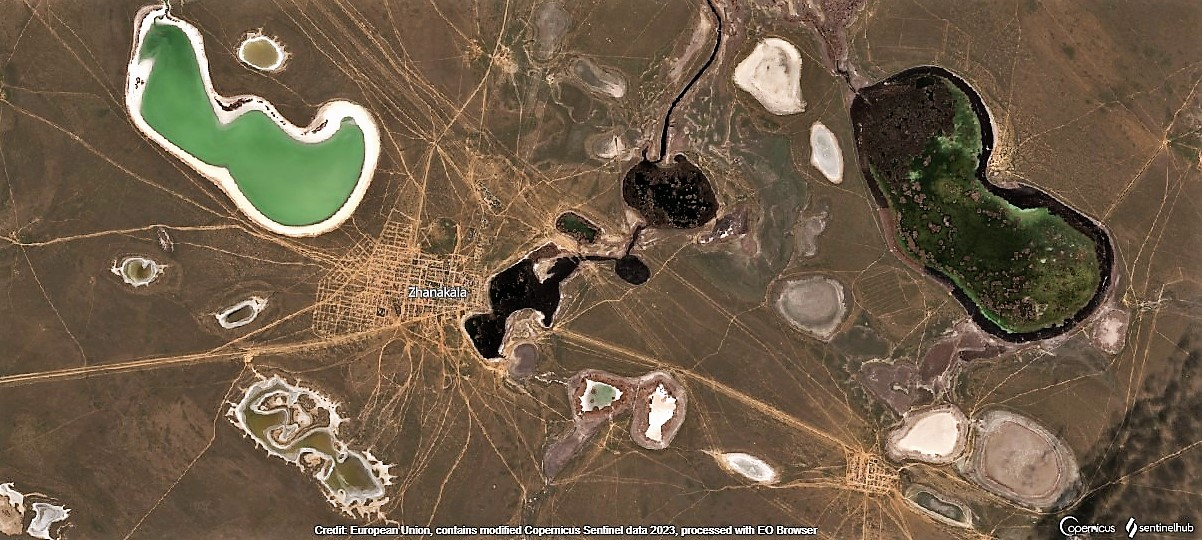
Zhanakala and the lake area where the Kushum ends.

== Fauna ==
The main fish species in the Kushum include zander, common bream, white-eye bream, chub, perch, silver bream, ruffe, common rudd, blue bream and sabrefish.

== See also ==
- List of rivers of Kazakhstan
