= Tokarevskoye gas condensate field =

Tokarevskoye
- Location within Kazakhstan
- Country: Kazakhstan
- Region: West Kazakhstan Province
- Offshore/onshore: onshore
- Coordinates: 51°07′N 50°12′E
- Operator: Joint Venture Stepnoy Leopard, Ltd

Field history
- Discovery: 1969

The Tokarevskoye gas condensate field, 80 km west of Oral, consists of four individual accumulations whose productivity is proved by several wells. Gas water surface of some deposits range between 2776–2082 m.
