= Buldyrty =

River in Kazakhstan

Buldyrty Бұлдырты)
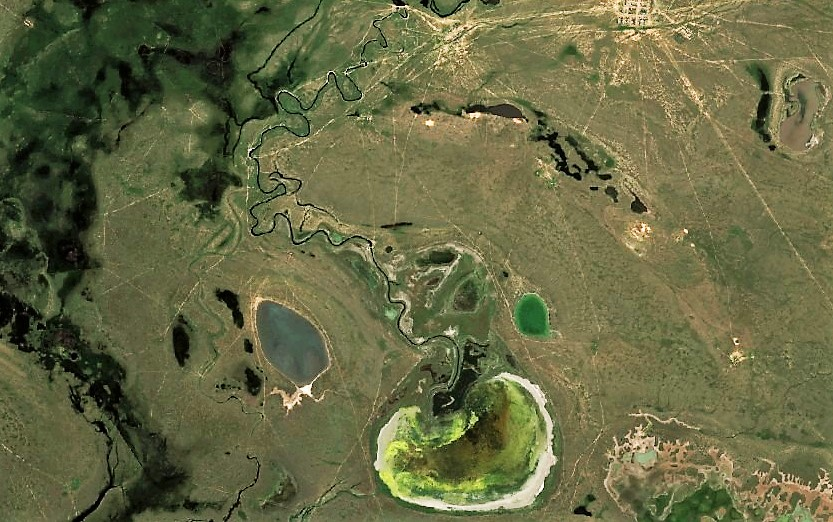
- Last stretch of the Buldyrty Sentinel-2 image

- Mouth location in Kazakhstan

Location
- Countries: Kazakhstan

Physical characteristics
- Source: near Aksuat
  - coordinates: 50°23′23″N 53°34′31″E
- Mouth: Zhaltyrkol
  - coordinates: 49°48′26″N 52°34′37″E
  - elevation: 9 m (30 ft)
- Length: 195 km (121 mi)
- Basin size: 4,660 km^{2} (1,800 sq mi)
- Discharge
  - average: 1.6 cubic metres per second (57 cu ft/s) near Abay village

The Buldyrty (Kazakh: Бұлдырты; Russian: Булдырты) is a river in the West Kazakhstan Region, Kazakhstan. It is 195 kilometres (121 mi) long and has a catchment area of 4,660 square kilometres (1,800 sq mi).

The Buldyrty belongs to the Ural basin and flows across the Syrym, Karatobe and Shyngyrlau districts. The banks of the river are a seasonal grazing ground for local cattle. The name of the river originated in the Kazakh word for turbid or murky.

== Course ==
The Buldyrty begins at the confluence of two small rivers, the Bylkyldagan and Zhosaly, close to Aksuat village. It heads in a southwestward direction across Shyngyrlau District, forming meanders within a floodplain. Shortly after Karasu village it bends southwards for a stretch until its mouth in the northern shore of lake Zhaltyrkol, located among other salt lakes. The Buldyrty river flows roughly parallel to the Olenti to the northwest and the Kaldygaity to the southeast.

In the upper reaches, down to Karagash (until 2007 Novopetrovka), the river valley has a steep slope, reaching a height up to 20 m (66 ft). In some places there are sand dunes stretching along both banks. The Buldyrty has three main tributaries, the Shili on the left, and the Tamdy and the 70 km (43 mi) long Zhympity on the right. The river is fed by snow and rain.

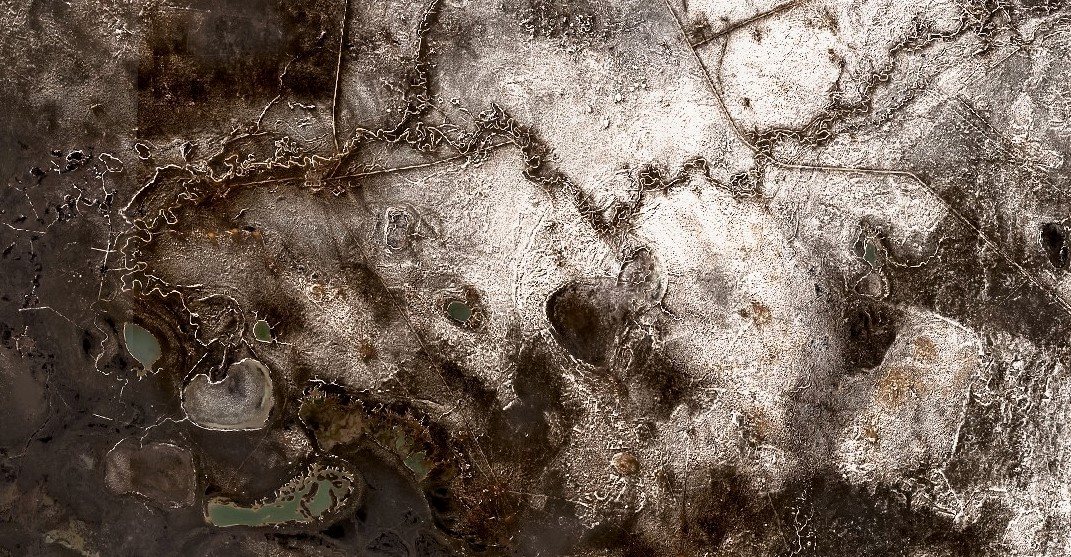
Lower Buldyrty basin in the winter.

== See also ==
- List of rivers of Kazakhstan
