= Krugloozyornoye =

Krugloozyornoye Круглоозёрное
- Urban-type settlement
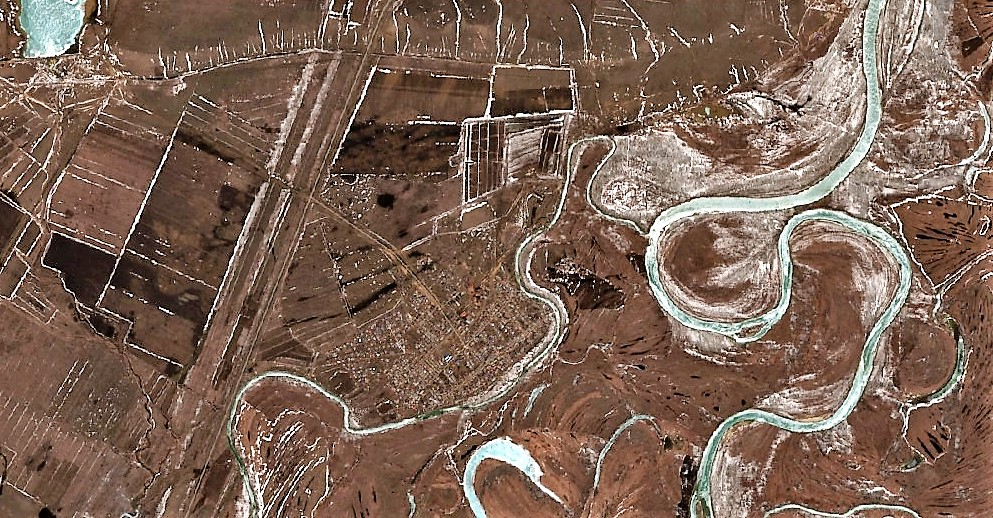
- Krugloozyornoye, with the Kushum branching off the Ural Sentinel-2 image

- Location within Kazakhstan
- Coordinates: 51°04′57″N 51°17′07″E
- Country: Kazakhstan
- Regione: West Kazakhstan Region
- District: Oral City Administration
- Established: 1930

Population (2022)
  - Total: 6,016
- Time zone: UTC+5 (UTC + 5)

Krugloozyornoye (Kazakh: Круглоозёрное) is an urban-type settlement in the Oral City Administration, West Kazakhstan Region, Kazakhstan. Since 2013 it includes the nearby village of Serebryakovo (KATO code - 271039100). Population: 3,782 (2009 census results); 2,942 (1999 census results).

== Geography ==
Krugloozyornoye is located by the west bank of the Ural river, south of where the Kushum branches off the Ural. It lies 11 kilometers (6.8 mi) SSW of Oral City.
