= Novoalekseyevka =

Novoalekseyevka (in Russian: Новоалексеевка) may refer to the following places:

- Novooleksiivka (Ukrainian: Новоолексіївка), in Kherson oblast, Ukraine.
- Bayterek, Almaty Region (previously named Novoalekseyevka), in south-eastern Kazakhstan.

== See also ==
- Tbilisi International Airport, previously named Novo Alexeyevka International Airport
