= Kaldygaity =

River in Kazakhstan

Kaldygaity Қалдығайты
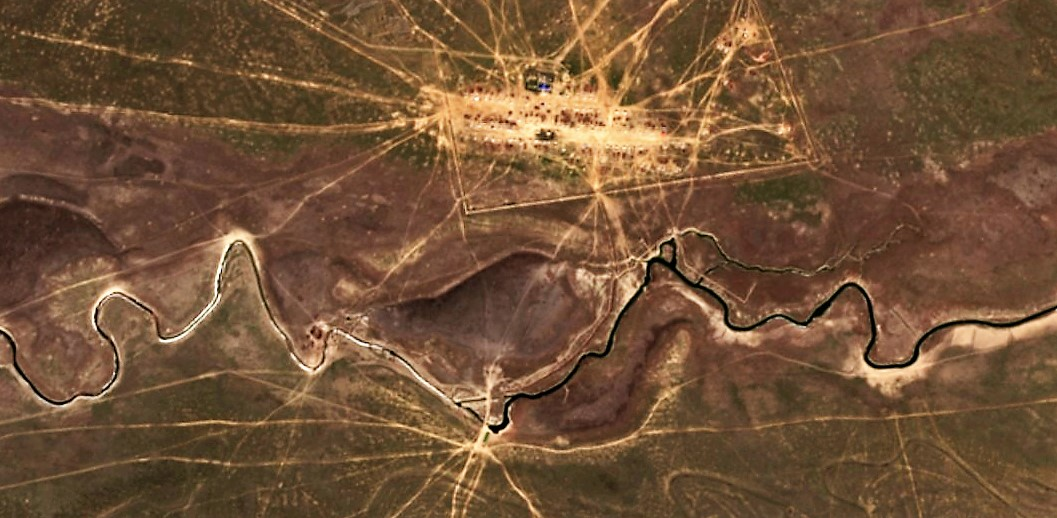
- The Kaldygaity meandering westwards south of Ushana village Sentinel-2 image

- Mouth location in Kazakhstan

Location
- Countries: Kazakhstan

Physical characteristics
- Source: Mt Almastau
  - coordinates: 50°09′14″N 54°21′07″E
  - elevation: ca 200 m (660 ft)
- Mouth: lakes near Tolen
  - coordinates: 49°26′07″N 52°42′00″E
  - elevation: 8 m (26 ft)
- Length: 243 km (151 mi)
- Basin size: 5,800 km^{2} (2,200 sq mi)

The Kaldygaity (Kazakh: Қалдығайты; Russian: Калдыгайты) is a river in the West Kazakhstan Region, Kazakhstan. It is 243 kilometres (151 mi) long and has a catchment area of 5,800 square kilometres (2,200 sq mi).

The Kaldygaity belongs to the Ural basin. The banks of the river are a seasonal grazing ground for local cattle.

== Course ==
The Kaldygaity has its sources in the southwestern slopes of Mount Almastau. It heads first southwestwards across Shyngyrlau District, then it bends westwards and flows in that direction through Karatobe District. It forms meanders in a floodplain until it meets the wide salt lake area that lies near Tolen village. The Buldyrty (Бұлдырты) river flows parallel to the Kaldygaity roughly 45 kilometres (28 mi) to the northwest.

The Kaldygaity has 40 tributaries that are longer than 10 kilometres (6.2 mi). The main ones are the Peschanaya, Bayanas and Ashchysay. The river valley is wide and in its middle and lower course the Kaldygaity flows across sandy terrain. It is fed by snow and rain. On years of heavy snow its lower stretch floods.

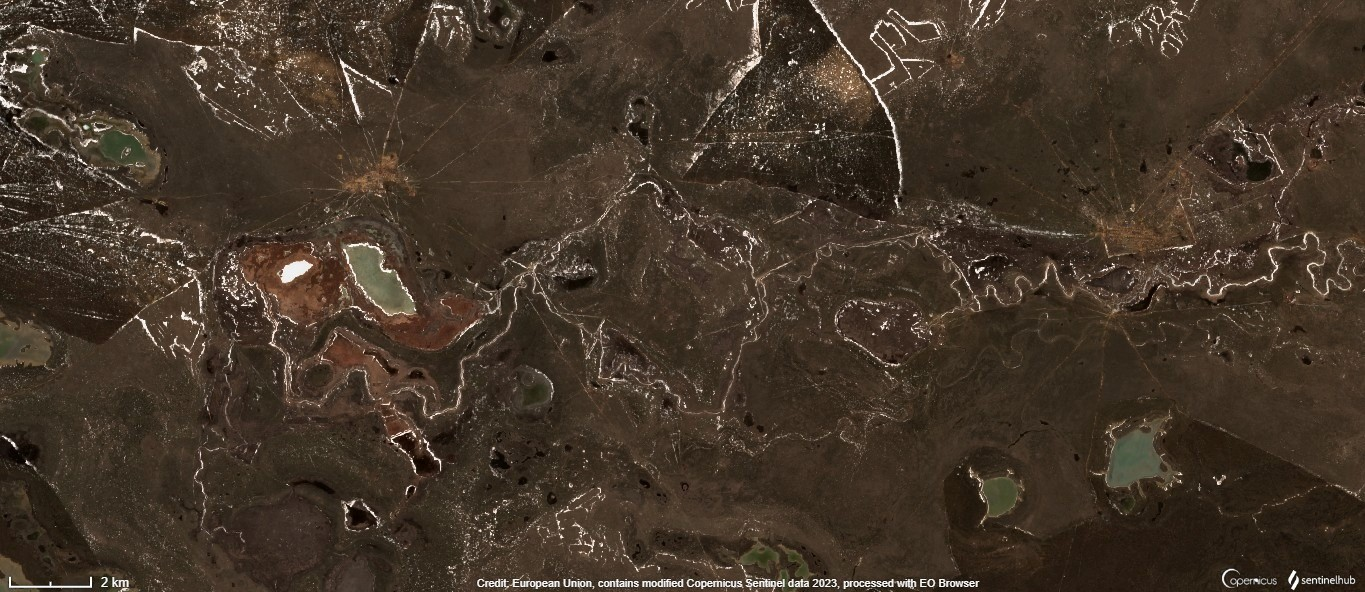
Final stretch of the river Sentinel-2 image.

== Fauna ==
The main fish species in the Kaldygaity include pike, Eurasian carp, perch and karabalik. The European pond turtle is also found in the river. The reed undergrowth of the lower reaches of the Kaldygaity and neighboring Olenti provides a habitat and a mass-breeding place for the Asian locust.

== See also ==
- List of rivers of Kazakhstan
