= Olenti (Tuzdy) =

River in Kazakhstan

Olenti Өлеңті
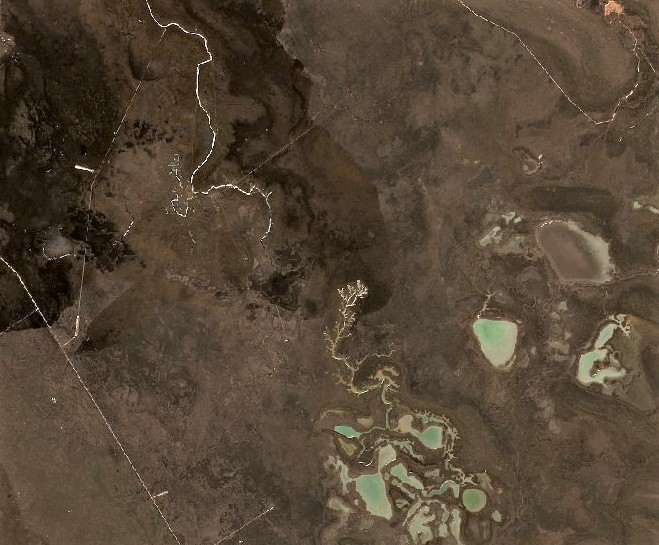
- Final stretch of the Olenti (upper left) and lake Tuzdy (lower right) Sentinel-2 image

- Mouth location in Kazakhstan

Location
- Countries: Kazakhstan

Physical characteristics
- Source: Pre-Ural Plateau
  - coordinates: 50°32′21″N 53°19′22″E
- Mouth: near lake Tuzdy
  - coordinates: 49°45′55″N 52°17′21″E
- Length: 211 km (131 mi)
- Basin size: 4,100 km^{2} (1,600 sq mi)
- Discharge
  - average: 3.06 cubic metres per second (108 cu ft/s)

The Olenti (Kazakh: Өлеңті; Russian: Оленти) is a river in the West Kazakhstan Region, Kazakhstan. It is 211 kilometres (131 mi) long and has a catchment area of 4,100 square kilometres (1,600 sq mi).

The Olenti belongs to the Ural basin. The name of the river originated in the Kazakh word for sedge.

== Course ==
The Olenti has its sources east of lake Shalkar, in the area between the Caspian Depression and the Mughalzhar Hills (Pre-Ural Plateau). It heads roughly southwestwards across Syrym District. The Buldyrty river flows roughly parallel to the southeast of that stretch. Then the Olenti bends southwards near the village of Saykudyk in Akzhaik District and flows almost straight in that direction. Finally it divides into shallow arms and its waters sink in the sand shortly before reaching lake Tuzdy to the SSE. Its main tributary is the Shiderti from the left.

The river valley is narrow in the upper reaches, widening to 200 m (660 ft) in its middle and lower course. It is fed by snow and rain, flowing mainly in March and April after the thaw. In the summer the Olenti stops flowing and breaks up into small pools.

== Fauna ==
The main fish species in the Olenti include carp, bream, pike and perch.

== See also ==
- List of rivers of Kazakhstan
