= Shyngyrlau =

Shyngyrlau Шыңғырлау
- Village
- Location within Kazakhstan
- Coordinates: 51°5′42″N 54°4′53″E
- Country: Kazakhstan
- Region: West Kazakhstan Region
- District: Shyngyrlau District

Population (2009)
  - Total: 7,005
- Time zone: UTC+5 (UTC + 5)

Shyngyrlau (Kazakh: Шыңғырлау, Şyñğyrlau; Russian: Чингирлау) is a village in north-western Kazakhstan. It is the administrative center of Shyngyrlau District in West Kazakhstan Region. Population: 7,005 (2009 census results); 6,722 (1999 census results).

== Climate ==
Climate data for Shyngyrlau (1991–2020)
Month	Jan	Feb	Mar	Apr	May	Jun	Jul	Aug	Sep	Oct	Nov	Dec	Year
Mean daily maximum °C (°F)	−7.6 (18.3)	−6.9 (19.6)	0.2 (32.4)	14.1 (57.4)	22.8 (73.0)	27.8 (82.0)	29.8 (85.6)	28.6 (83.5)	21.5 (70.7)	12.3 (54.1)	1.2 (34.2)	−5.6 (21.9)	11.5 (52.7)
Daily mean °C (°F)	−11.4 (11.5)	−11.1 (12.0)	−3.9 (25.0)	8.2 (46.8)	16.3 (61.3)	21.2 (70.2)	23.3 (73.9)	21.7 (71.1)	14.8 (58.6)	6.7 (44.1)	−2.3 (27.9)	−9.0 (15.8)	6.2 (43.2)
Mean daily minimum °C (°F)	−14.6 (5.7)	−14.5 (5.9)	−7.4 (18.7)	3.2 (37.8)	10.4 (50.7)	15.0 (59.0)	17.2 (63.0)	15.4 (59.7)	9.0 (48.2)	2.4 (36.3)	−5.1 (22.8)	−12.0 (10.4)	1.6 (34.9)
Average precipitation mm (inches)	22.8 (0.90)	18.1 (0.71)	17.8 (0.70)	23.2 (0.91)	24.2 (0.95)	28.7 (1.13)	27.9 (1.10)	22.4 (0.88)	20.4 (0.80)	26.7 (1.05)	23.4 (0.92)	25.2 (0.99)	280.8 (11.06)
Average precipitation days (≥ 1.0 mm)	6.9	5.5	5.0	4.5	4.5	4.9	4.4	3.7	4.0	5.0	5.7	7.1	61.2
Source: NOAA
