= Peremyotnoye =

Peremetnoe Перемётное
- Village
- Peremetnoe
- Location within Kazakhstan
- Coordinates: 51°11′0″N 50°49′0″E
- Country: Kazakhstan
- Region: West Kazakhstan Region
- District: Bayterek District

Population (1998)
  - Total: 4,308
- Time zone: UTC+5 (UTC + 5)

Peremyotnoye (Russian: Перемётное) is a village in far north-western Kazakhstan. It is the administrative center of Bayterek District in West Kazakhstan Region. Population: 4,308 (2009 census results); 4,406 (1999 census results).
