= Taskala District =

Coordinates: 50°51′36″N 49°58′48″E

Taskala Тасқала
- District
- Тасқала ауданы
- Entrance sign of Tasqala District

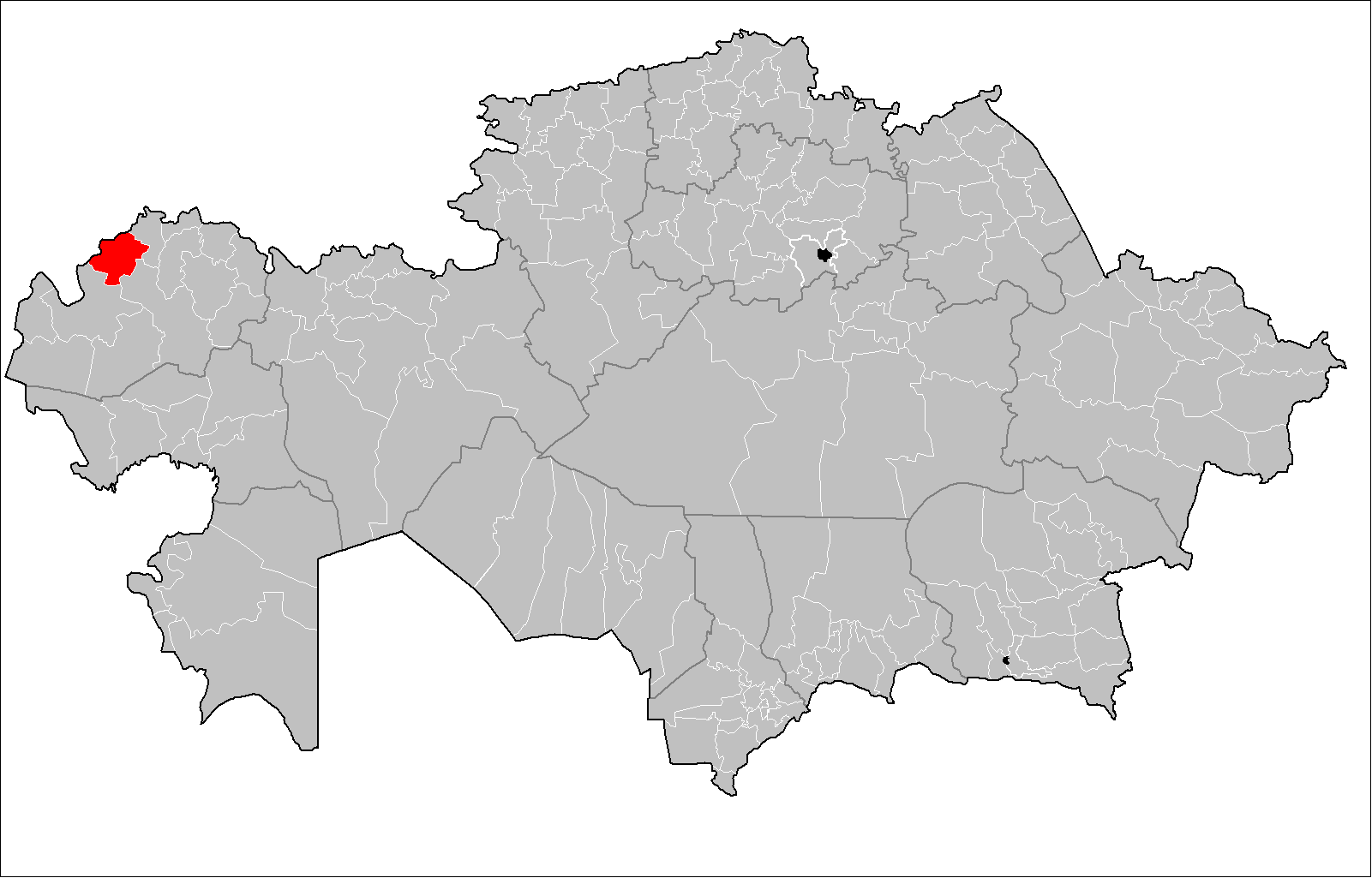
- Location of Taskala District in Kazakhstan
- Country: Kazakhstan
- Region: West Kazakhstan Region
- Administrative center: Taskala

Government
  - Akim: Aitmagambetov Bauyrzhan Oskarovich

Population (2013)
  - Total: 17,091
- Time zone: UTC+5 (West)

Taskala (Kazakh: Тасқала ауданы, Tasqala audany) is a district of West Kazakhstan Region in western Kazakhstan. The administrative center of the district is the selo of Taskala. Population: 17,091 (2013 estimate); 17,202 (2009 census results); 20,645 (1999 census results).
