= Borili District =

Coordinates: 51.167205°N 52.997066°E

Borili Бөрілі
- District
- Бөрілі ауданы
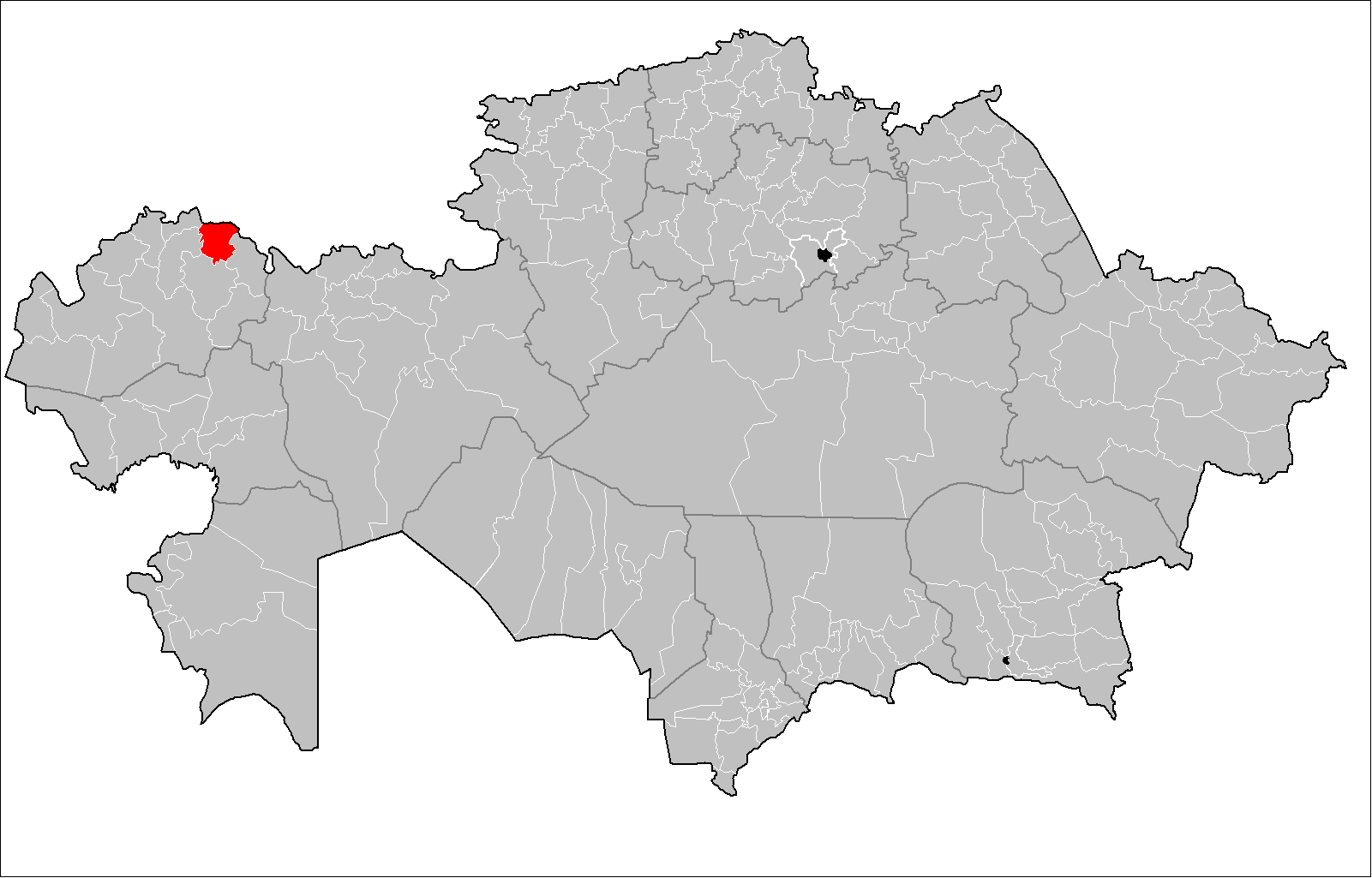
- Location of Borili District in Kazakhstan
- Country: Kazakhstan
- Region: West Kazakhstan Region
- Administrative center: Aksay

Government
  - Akim: Ikhsanov Yerkebulan Nuretdinovich

Population (2013)
  - Total: 54,809
- Time zone: UTC+5 (West)

Borili (Kazakh: Бөрілі ауданы, Börılı audany) is a district of West Kazakhstan Region in western Kazakhstan. The administrative center of the district is the town of Aksay. Population: 54,809 (2013 estimate); 53,235 (2009 census results); 48,958 (1999 census results).

== Geography ==
The district is located in the north-eastern part of the West Kazakhstan region. The district borders on three districts of the West Kazakhstan region and in the north along the Ilek and Ural river with the Orenburg region of the Russian Federation. The territory of the district covers an area of 5.6 thousand square kilometers. The climate is continental. Summers are hot, winters are harsh. The average temperature in January is — −15 °C, in July - 24 °C. The average annual rainfall is 200–250 mm. The subsoil is rich in oil and gas (the Karachaganak Field). Located in the desert zone. The rivers Ural, Ilek, Utva (Shingirlau) flow through the territory of the region. Soils are mostly chestnut and solonchak. Oaks, field elm, poplar, cotoneaster and others grow. There are fox, corsac, wild boar; from birds - bustard, little bustard.
