= Chapaev, Kazakhstan =

Town in Kazakhstan

Chapayev Чапаев Kazakh: Ілбішін, romanized: Ilbishin
- Town
- Ulbishin
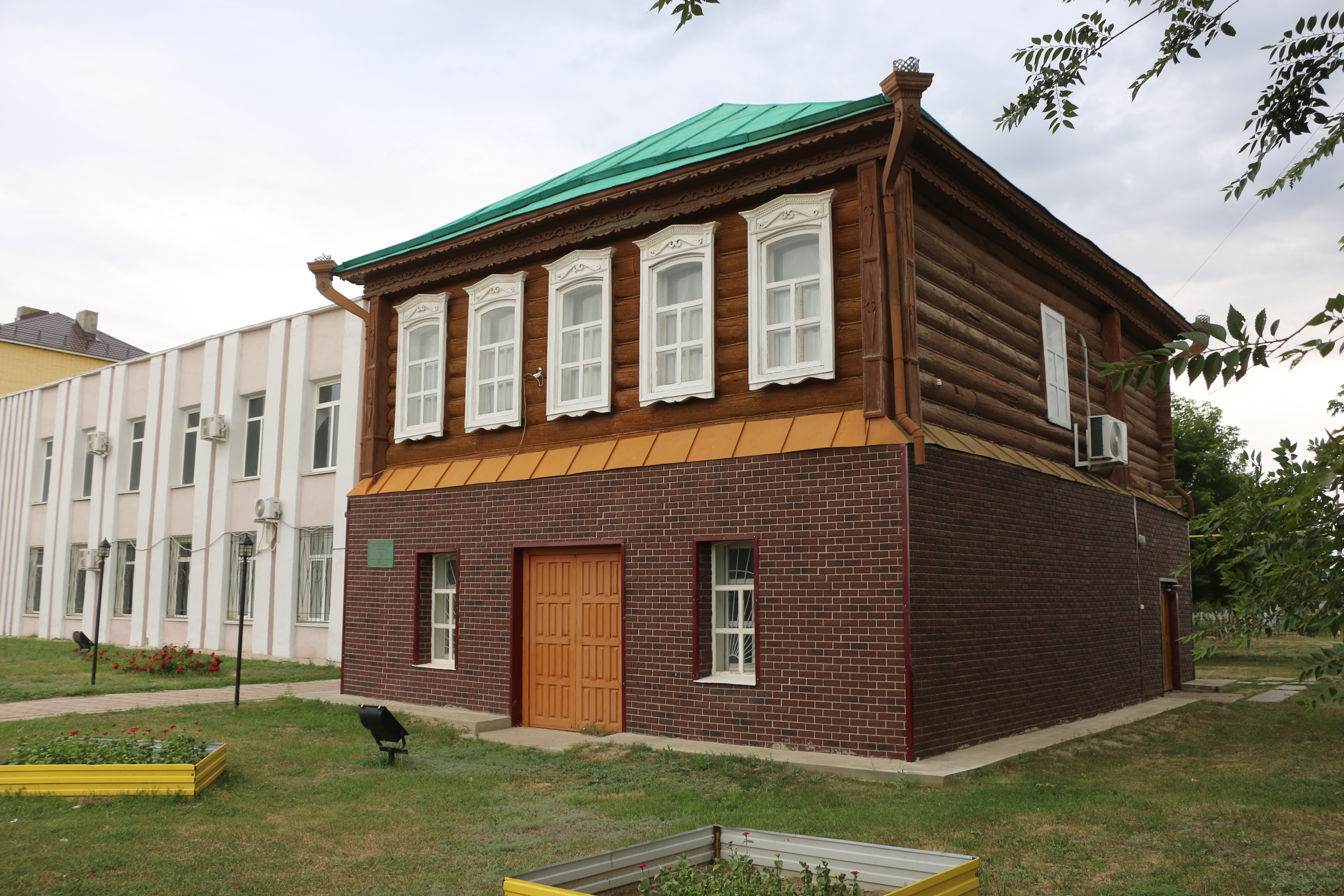
- The Chapaev Museum

- Location within Kazakhstan
- Coordinates: 50°12′N 51°10′E
- Country: Kazakhstan
- Region: West Kazakhstan Region
- District: Akzhaik District

Population (2009)
  - Total: 8,476
- Time zone: UTC+5 (UTC + 5)

Chapaev (Kazakh: Чапаев, Chapaev; Russian: Чапаев) is a town in north-western Kazakhstan. It is the seat of Akzhaik District in West Kazakhstan Region. The town is located 130 km south of Oral, Kazakhstan (Uralsk), on the right bank of the Ural River.

== Population ==
8,476 (2009 census results); 8,344 (1999 census results).

== History ==
According to the Brockhaus and Efron Encyclopedic Dictionary, in 19th century the local residents were reported to be mainly engaged in agriculture, fishing, herding, hunting and gathering liquorice root.

The earlier settlement was named Ilbishin (Ulbishin, Kazakh: Ілбішін) or Lbishchensk (Russian: Лбищенск) since the 20th century and in 1899 the town had 3400 people (2100 of which were Cossacks), 2 churches, 2 schools, and mail and telegraph connections. It was renamed Chapaevo in 1939 and Chapaev in 1992.

In 1997 the town became the capital of Akzhaik District.

== Climate ==
Climate data for Chapaev (1991–2020)
Month	Jan	Feb	Mar	Apr	May	Jun	Jul	Aug	Sep	Oct	Nov	Dec	Year
Mean daily maximum °C (°F)	−5.8 (21.6)	−5.1 (22.8)	2.6 (36.7)	15.6 (60.1)	23.9 (75.0)	29.3 (84.7)	31.5 (88.7)	30.2 (86.4)	22.9 (73.2)	13.5 (56.3)	2.8 (37.0)	−3.9 (25.0)	13.1 (55.6)
Daily mean °C (°F)	−9.5 (14.9)	−9.3 (15.3)	−1.8 (28.8)	9.3 (48.7)	17.2 (63.0)	22.4 (72.3)	24.7 (76.5)	22.9 (73.2)	15.8 (60.4)	7.7 (45.9)	−0.9 (30.4)	−7.3 (18.9)	7.6 (45.7)
Mean daily minimum °C (°F)	−13.1 (8.4)	−13.2 (8.2)	−5.8 (21.6)	3.5 (38.3)	10.6 (51.1)	15.5 (59.9)	17.8 (64.0)	15.9 (60.6)	9.0 (48.2)	2.6 (36.7)	−4.1 (24.6)	−10.6 (12.9)	2.3 (36.1)
Average precipitation mm (inches)	17.9 (0.70)	14.6 (0.57)	17.8 (0.70)	22.0 (0.87)	23.2 (0.91)	32.1 (1.26)	19.8 (0.78)	17.4 (0.69)	20.1 (0.79)	27.8 (1.09)	21.7 (0.85)	19.9 (0.78)	254.3 (10.01)
Average precipitation days (≥ 1.0 mm)	5.2	4.7	4.6	4.1	3.8	4.7	3.4	2.8	3.3	4.8	5.1	5.2	51.7
Source: NOAA
