= Aksay, West Kazakhstan Region =

Aksay Ақсай
- Town
- Ақсай (Aqsay)
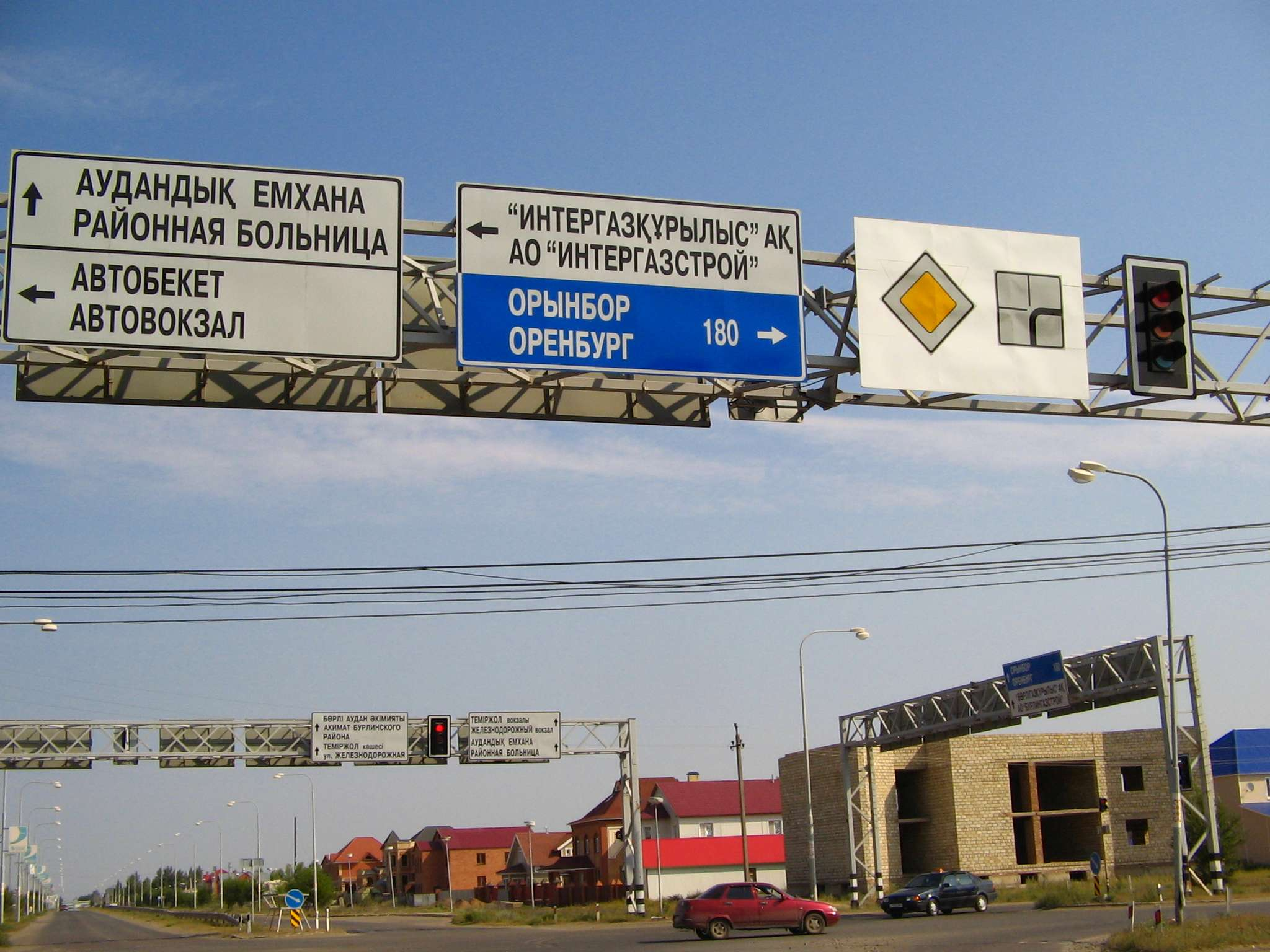

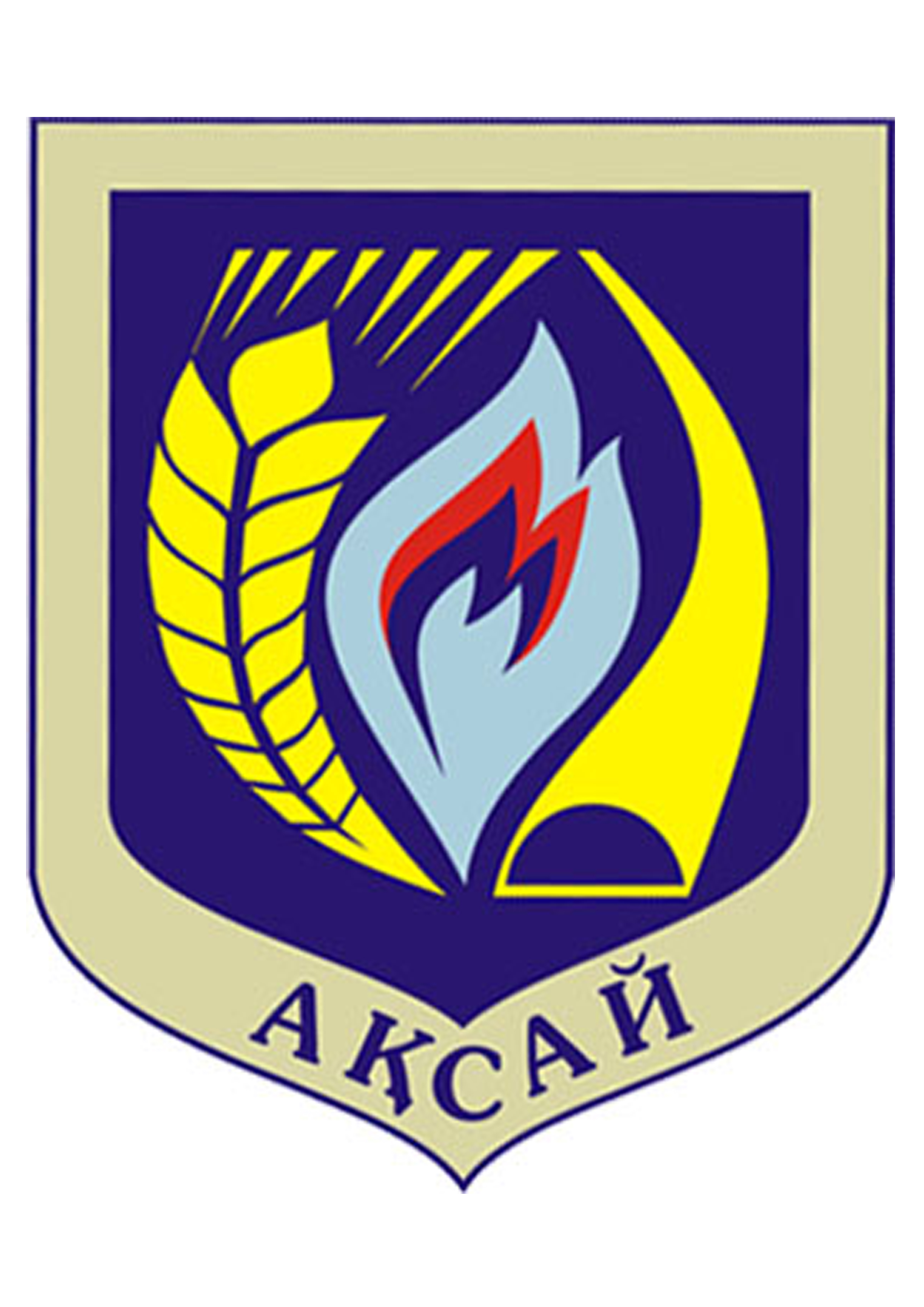
- Coat of arms

- Location within Kazakhstan
- Coordinates: 51°10′04″N 52°59′42″E
- Country: Kazakhstan
- Region: West Kazakhstan Region
- District: Borili District
- Established: 1936

Government
  - Mayor: Yerkebulan Ikhsanov

Population (2009)
  - Total: 32,873
- Time zone: UTC+5 (UTC + 5)
- Postal code: 090300
- Area code: 71133

Aksay (Kazakh: Ақсай, romanized: Aqsai) is a town in north-western Kazakhstan. It is the administrative center of Borili District in West Kazakhstan Region. Population: 32,873 (2009 census results); 28,953 (1999 census results).

It is an important oil and gas town, serving as an operational base for the nearby Karachaganak Field.

== Climate ==
Aksay has a hot-summer humid continental climate (Köppen climate classification Dfa).

Climate data for Aksay
Month	Jan	Feb	Mar	Apr	May	Jun	Jul	Aug	Sep	Oct	Nov	Dec	Year
Mean daily maximum °C (°F)	−8.9 (16.0)	−8.2 (17.2)	−1.2 (29.8)	13.6 (56.5)	23.1 (73.6)	27.5 (81.5)	29.6 (85.3)	27.8 (82.0)	21.3 (70.3)	10.4 (50.7)	0.9 (33.6)	−5.1 (22.8)	10.9 (51.6)
Mean daily minimum °C (°F)	−17.1 (1.2)	−17.3 (0.9)	−9.8 (14.4)	1.9 (35.4)	9.0 (48.2)	13.7 (56.7)	16.1 (61.0)	14.0 (57.2)	8.1 (46.6)	0.7 (33.3)	−5.6 (21.9)	−12.4 (9.7)	0.1 (32.2)
Average precipitation mm (inches)	23 (0.9)	18 (0.7)	18 (0.7)	20 (0.8)	21 (0.8)	37 (1.5)	35 (1.4)	25 (1.0)	28 (1.1)	31 (1.2)	33 (1.3)	32 (1.3)	321 (12.6)
Source: Climate-data.org
