= Zhanakala =

Zhanakala Жаңақала
- Town
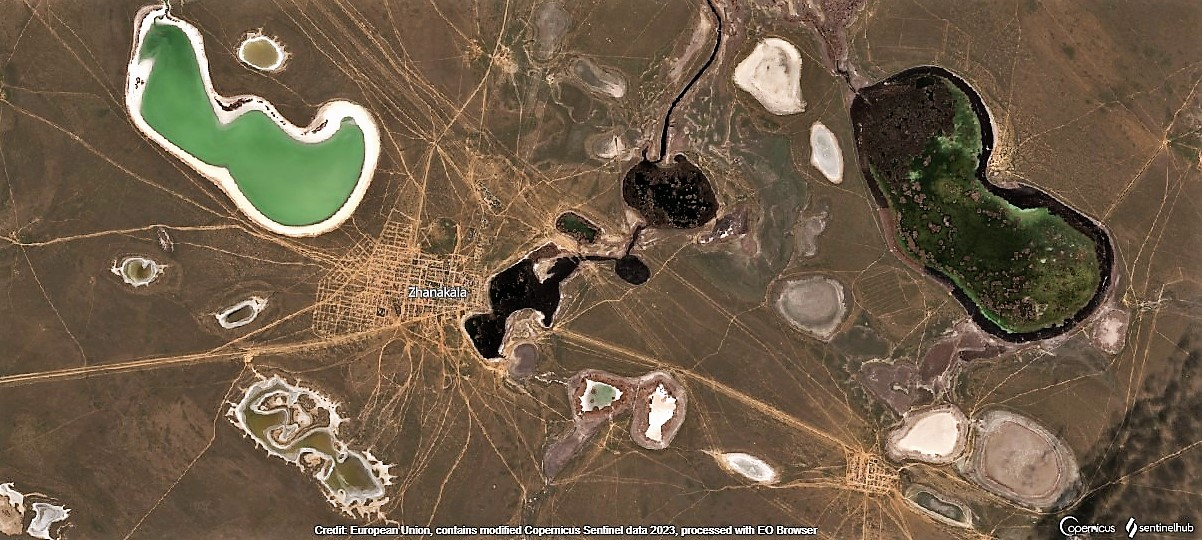
- Zhanakala and the lake area where the Kushum ends

- Location within Kazakhstan
- Coordinates: 49°12′51″N 50°17′47″E
- Country: Kazakhstan
- Region: West Kazakhstan Region
- District: Zhanakala District

Population (2009)
  - Total: 7,202
- Time zone: UTC+5 (UTC + 5)

Zhanakala (Kazakh: Жаңақала, Jañaqala; Russian: Жангала) is a town in north-western Kazakhstan. It is the seat of Zhanakala District in West Kazakhstan Region. Population: 7,202 (2009 census results); 6,250 (1999 census results).

== Geography ==
The town is located close to where the Kushum river flows into lake Birkazan.

=== Climate ===
Zhanakala has a cold semi-arid climate (Köppen: BSk), characterized by cold winters and hot summers.

Climate data for Zhanakala (1991–2020)
Month	Jan	Feb	Mar	Apr	May	Jun	Jul	Aug	Sep	Oct	Nov	Dec	Year
Mean daily maximum °C (°F)	−5.2 (22.6)	−4.1 (24.6)	4.2 (39.6)	16.5 (61.7)	24.8 (76.6)	30.4 (86.7)	32.6 (90.7)	31.3 (88.3)	23.8 (74.8)	14.3 (57.7)	3.5 (38.3)	−3.3 (26.1)	14.1 (57.4)
Daily mean °C (°F)	−8.9 (16.0)	−8.5 (16.7)	−0.8 (30.6)	9.9 (49.8)	17.9 (64.2)	23.4 (74.1)	25.8 (78.4)	24.0 (75.2)	16.6 (61.9)	8.1 (46.6)	−0.5 (31.1)	−6.6 (20.1)	8.4 (47.1)
Mean daily minimum °C (°F)	−12.2 (10.0)	−12.0 (10.4)	−4.6 (23.7)	4.4 (39.9)	11.6 (52.9)	16.8 (62.2)	19.2 (66.6)	17.2 (63.0)	10.2 (50.4)	3.3 (37.9)	−3.4 (25.9)	−9.5 (14.9)	3.4 (38.1)
Average precipitation mm (inches)	13.0 (0.51)	9.8 (0.39)	15.2 (0.60)	19.6 (0.77)	19.7 (0.78)	20.9 (0.82)	19.4 (0.76)	11.6 (0.46)	14.4 (0.57)	24.4 (0.96)	16.3 (0.64)	14.9 (0.59)	199.2 (7.84)
Average precipitation days (≥ 1.0 mm)	4.0	3.2	4.2	3.8	3.8	3.6	2.9	2.5	2.9	4.5	3.8	4.6	43.8
Source: NOAA
