= Shyngyrlau District =

Coordinates: 50°40′48″N 53°55′12″E

Shyngyrlau Шыңғырлау
- District
- Шыңғырлау ауданы
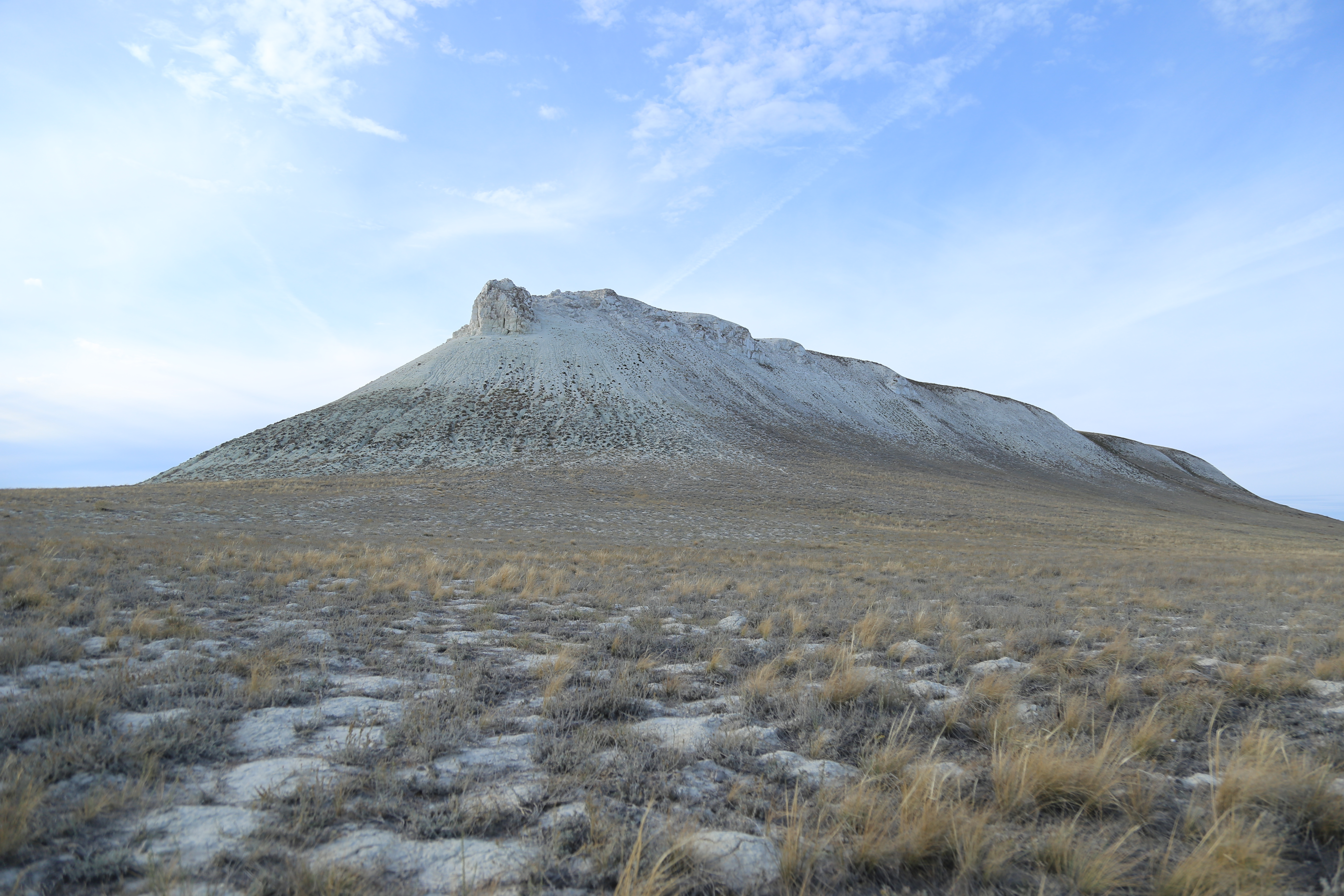
- Mt Toryatbas

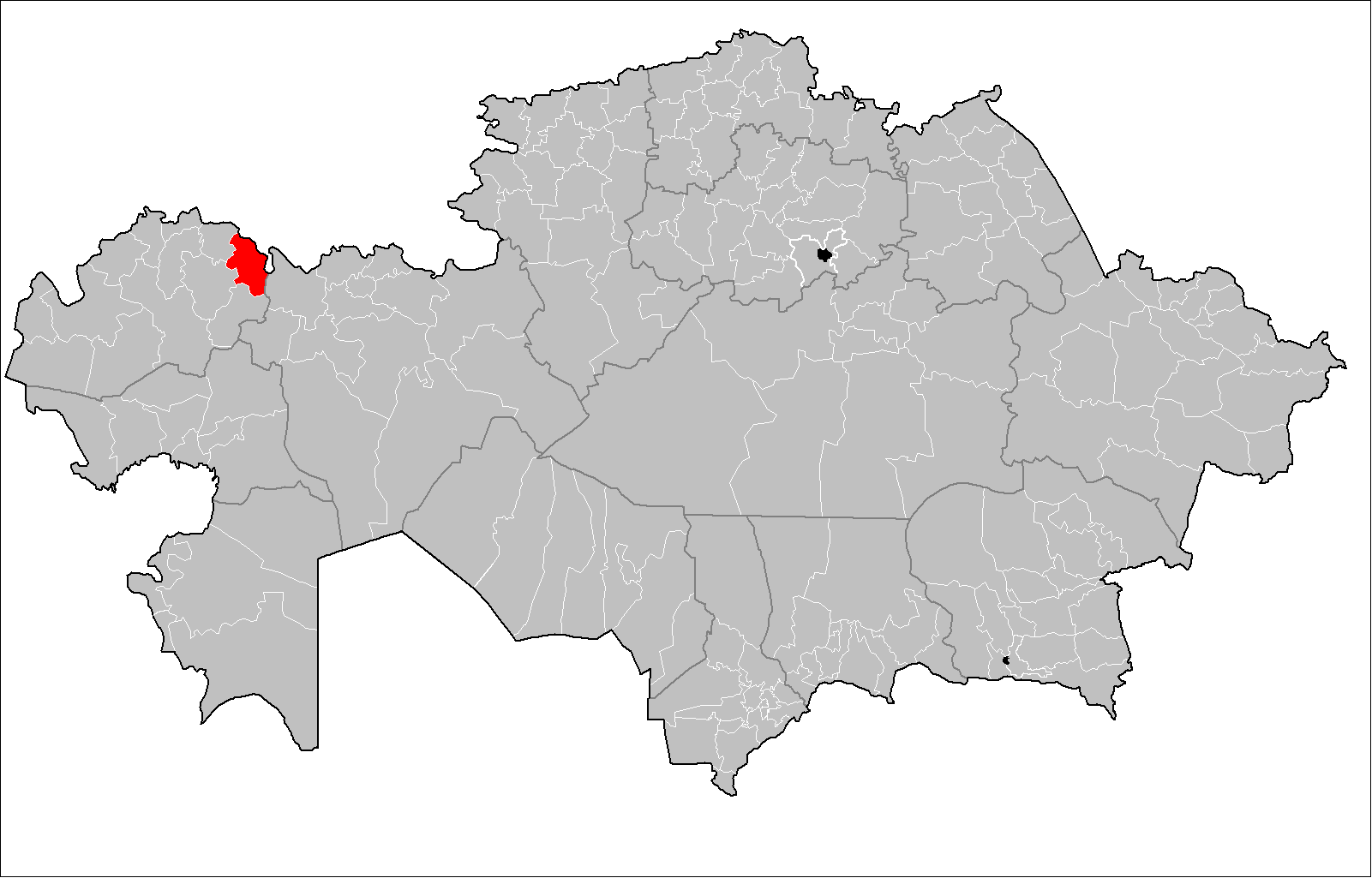
- Location of Shyngyrlau District in Kazakhstan
- Country: Kazakhstan
- Region: West Kazakhstan Region
- Administrative center: Shyngyrlau

Government
  - Akim: Murat Umraleev

Population (2013)
  - Total: 15,304
- Time zone: UTC+5 (West)

Shyngyrlau (Kazakh: Шыңғырлау ауданы, Şyñğyrlau audany) is a district of West Kazakhstan Region in western Kazakhstan. The administrative center of the district is the selo of Shyngyrlau. Population: 15,304 (2013 estimate); 16,116 (2009 census results); 21,799 (1999 census results).

== Geography ==
The Utva, Ilek, Buldyrty and Kaldygaity are some of the main rivers of the Ural basin that flow across the territory of the district.
