= Zhanakala District =

Coordinates: 48°59′24″N 49°56′24″E

Zhanakala Жаңақала
- District
- Жаңақала ауданы
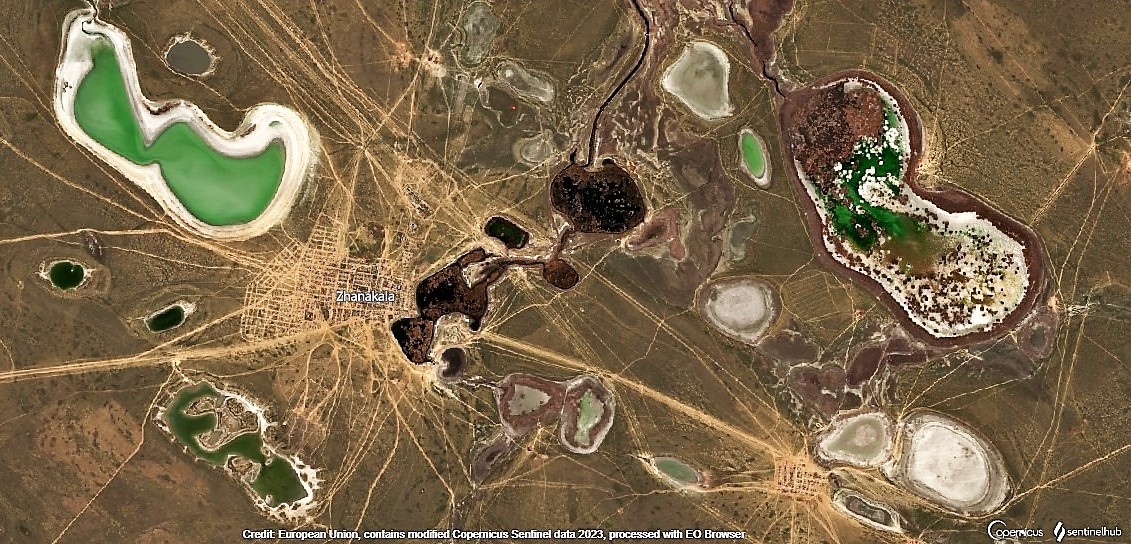
- Zhanakala town and the lake area where the Kushum ends

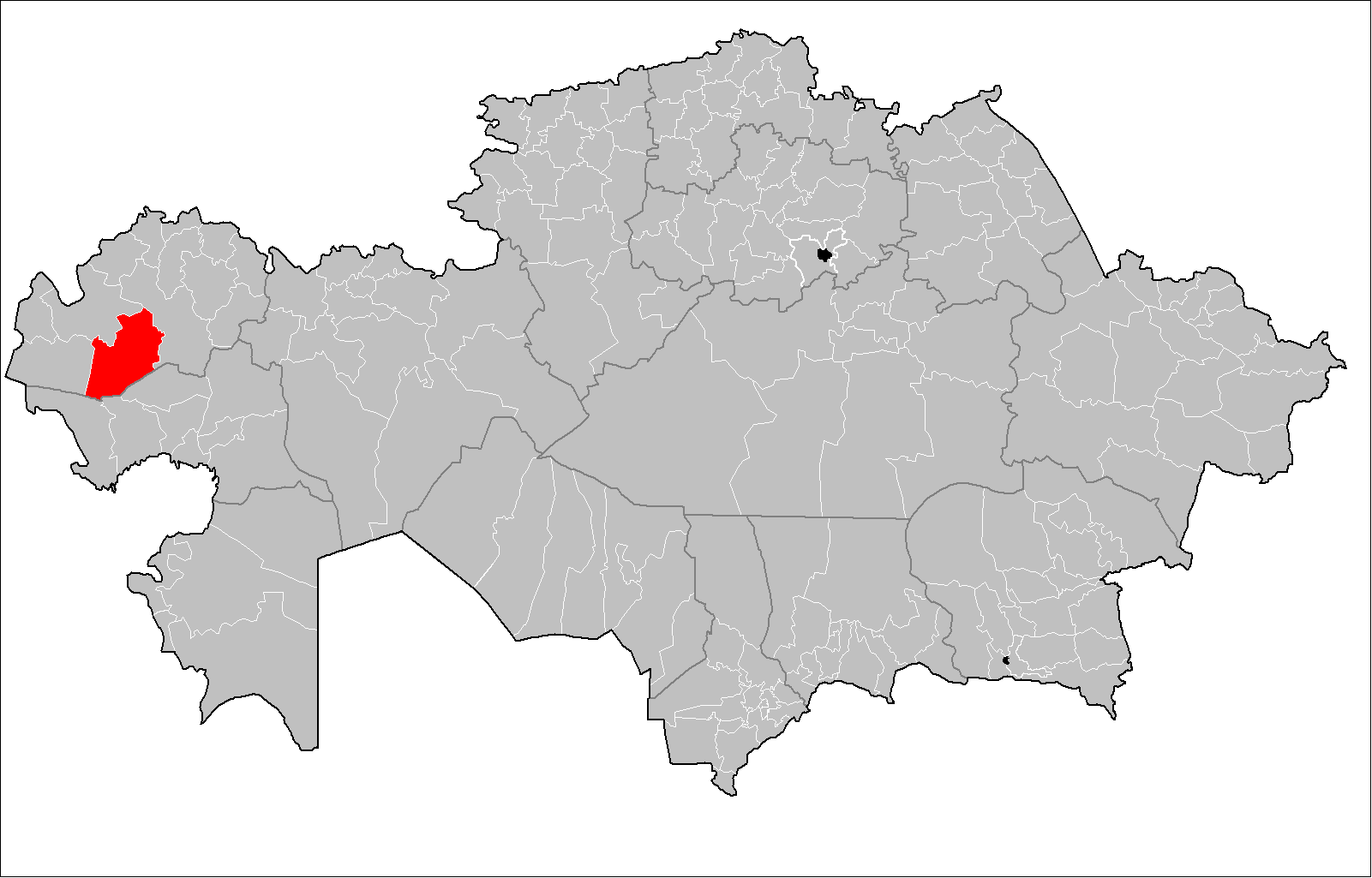
- Location of Zhanakala District in Kazakhstan
- Country: Kazakhstan
- Region: West Kazakhstan Region
- Administrative center: Zhanakala

Government
  - Akim: Zakarin Darkhan Amirkhanovich

Population (2013)
  - Total: 23,742
- Time zone: UTC+5 (West)

Zhanakala (Kazakh: Жаңақала ауданы, Jaŋaqala audany) is a district of West Kazakhstan Region in western Kazakhstan. The administrative center of the district is the selo of Zhanakala. Population: 23,742 (2013 estimate); 23,505 (2009 census results); 23,560 (1999 census results).
