= List of Äkims of West Kazakhstan Region =

This is the list of äkıms of West Kazakhstan Region that have held the position since 1992.

== List of Äkıms ==
- Näjımeden Esqaliev (7 February 1992 – 18 January 1993)
- Qabibolla Jaqypov (19 January 1993 – 18 December 2000)
- Qyrymbek Köşerbaev (18 December 2000 – 18 November 2003)
- Nūrğali Äşım (18 November 2003 – 28 August 2007)
- Baqtyqoja Izmūhambetov (28 August 2007 – 18 January 2012)
- Nūrlan Noğaev (20 January 2012 – 26 March 2016)
- Altai Kölgınov (26 March 2016 – 13 June 2019)
- Ğali Esqaliev (13 June 2019 – 2 December 2022)
- Nariman Töreğaliev (2 December 2022 – present)
