= Terekti =

Terekti Теректі
- Village
- Location within Kazakhstan
- Coordinates: 51°12′N 51°59′E
- Country: Kazakhstan
- Region: West Kazakhstan Region
- District: Terekti District

Population (2009)
  - Total: 4,597
- Time zone: UTC+5 (UTC + 5)

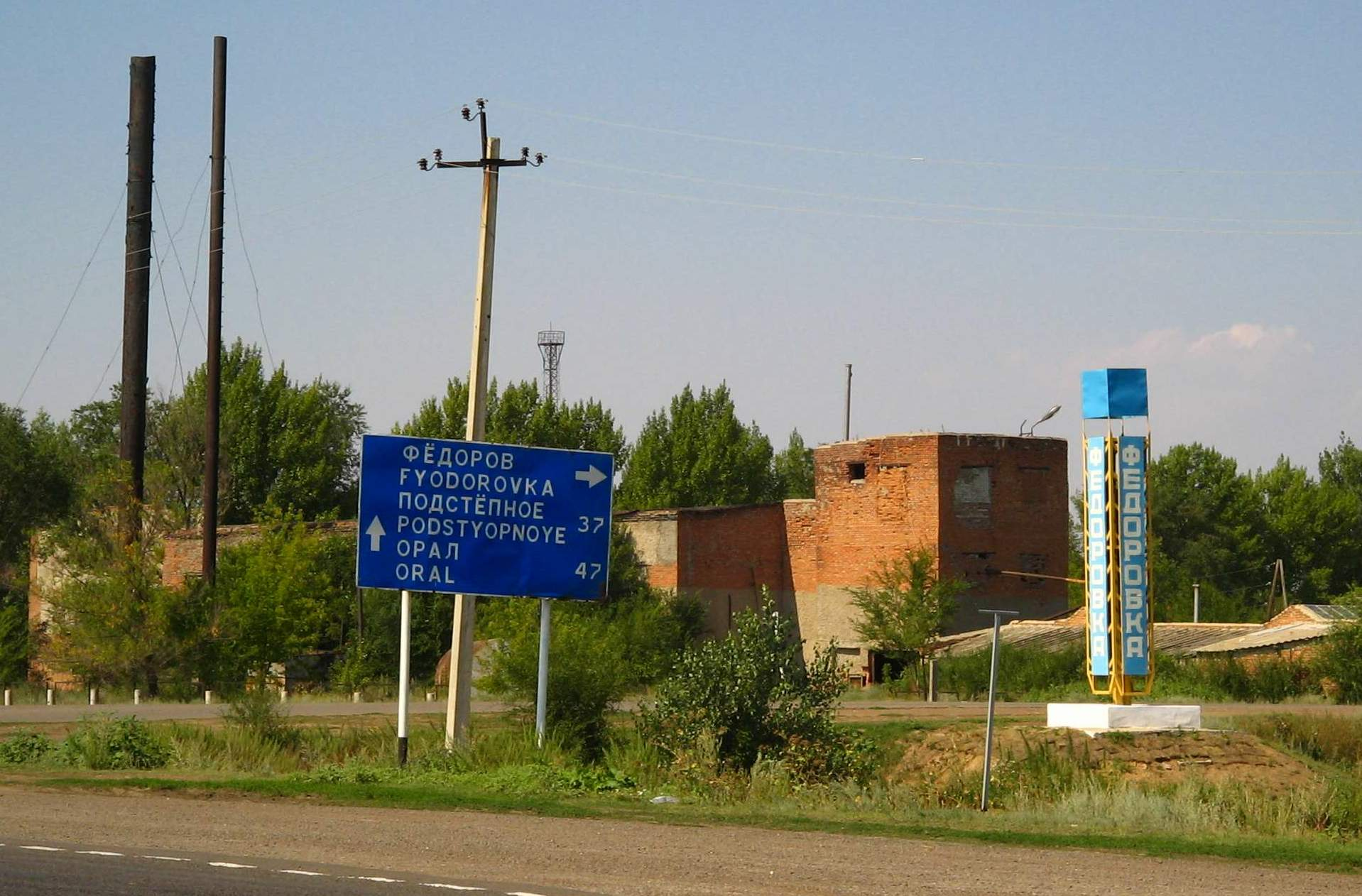
Road sign at the entrance to the village

Terekti (Kazakh: Теректі), until 2022 known as Fyodorovka (Russian: Фёдоровка) is a village in north-western Kazakhstan. It is the administrative center of Terekti District in West Kazakhstan Region. Population: 4,597 (2009 census results); 4,956 (1999 census results).

== Geography ==
The Ural River flows to the north of Terekti.
