= Zhympity =

Zhympity Жымпиты
- Village
- Location within Kazakhstan
- Coordinates: 50°15′13″N 52°35′42″E
- Country: Kazakhstan
- Region: West Kazakhstan Region
- District: Syrym District

Population (2009)
  - Total: 4,931
- Time zone: UTC+5 (UTC + 5)

Zhympity (Kazakh: Жымпиты, [ʐəmpɯjtɯ]; Russian: Жымпиты) is a village in north-western Kazakhstan. It is the administrative center of Syrym District in West Kazakhstan Region. Population: 4,931 (2009 census results); 5,774 (1999 census results).

== Climate ==
Zhympity has a cold semi-arid climate (BSk) according to the Köppen climate classification.

Climate data for Zhympity (1991–2020)
Month	Jan	Feb	Mar	Apr	May	Jun	Jul	Aug	Sep	Oct	Nov	Dec	Year
Mean daily maximum °C (°F)	−6.5 (20.3)	−5.8 (21.6)	1.9 (35.4)	15.5 (59.9)	24.2 (75.6)	29.7 (85.5)	31.7 (89.1)	30.5 (86.9)	23.2 (73.8)	13.6 (56.5)	2.4 (36.3)	−4.5 (23.9)	13.0 (55.4)
Daily mean °C (°F)	−10.4 (13.3)	−10.2 (13.6)	−2.7 (27.1)	8.8 (47.8)	16.9 (62.4)	22.2 (72.0)	24.4 (75.9)	22.7 (72.9)	15.5 (59.9)	7.3 (45.1)	−1.5 (29.3)	−8.0 (17.6)	7.1 (44.8)
Mean daily minimum °C (°F)	−14.0 (6.8)	−14.1 (6.6)	−6.6 (20.1)	3.1 (37.6)	10.0 (50.0)	14.8 (58.6)	17.2 (63.0)	15.5 (59.9)	8.8 (47.8)	2.2 (36.0)	−4.7 (23.5)	−11.3 (11.7)	1.7 (35.1)
Average precipitation mm (inches)	16.4 (0.65)	14.7 (0.58)	17.7 (0.70)	19.9 (0.78)	25.1 (0.99)	25.3 (1.00)	27.8 (1.09)	12.7 (0.50)	19.4 (0.76)	25.3 (1.00)	21.9 (0.86)	18.8 (0.74)	245.0 (9.65)
Average precipitation days (≥ 1.0 mm)	4.8	4.4	4.8	4.3	4.7	4.7	3.5	2.7	3.7	5.1	5.3	5.3	53.3
Source: NOAA
