= Taskala =

Taskala Тасқала
- Town
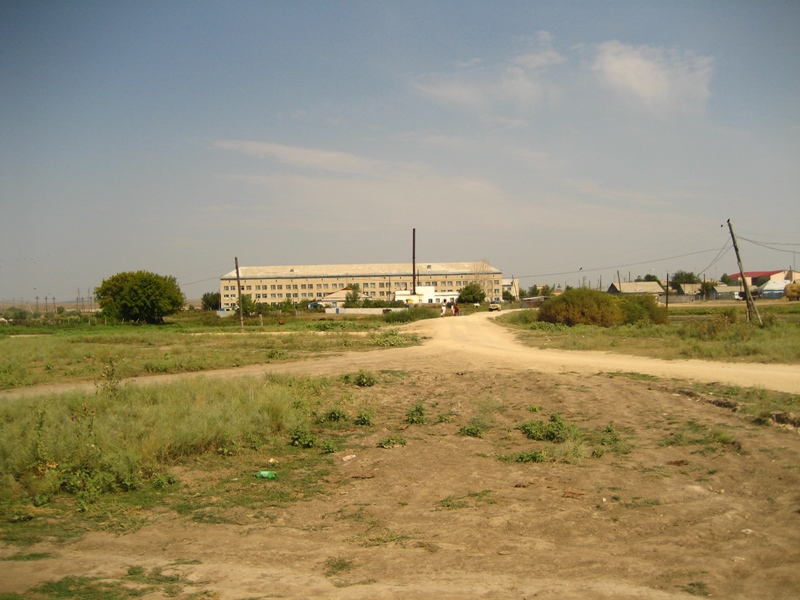
- Taskala Hospital

- Location within Kazakhstan
- Coordinates: 51°07′N 50°19′E
- Country: Kazakhstan
- Region: West Kazakhstan Region
- District: Taskala District

Population (2009)
  - Total: 7,350
- Time zone: UTC+5 (UTC + 5)

Taskala (Kazakh: Тасқала, Tasqala; Russian: Таскала), previously Kamenka, is a small town in north-western Kazakhstan on the border with Russia. It is the administrative center of Taskala District in West Kazakhstan Region. Population: 7,350 (2009 census results); 7,054 (1999 census results).

== Climate ==
Climate data for Taskala (1991–2020)
Month	Jan	Feb	Mar	Apr	May	Jun	Jul	Aug	Sep	Oct	Nov	Dec	Year
Mean daily maximum °C (°F)	−6.9 (19.6)	−6.2 (20.8)	0.9 (33.6)	14.1 (57.4)	23.3 (73.9)	28.1 (82.6)	30.4 (86.7)	29.1 (84.4)	21.8 (71.2)	12.2 (54.0)	1.8 (35.2)	−5.0 (23.0)	12.0 (53.6)
Daily mean °C (°F)	−10.5 (13.1)	−10.6 (12.9)	−3.8 (25.2)	7.4 (45.3)	15.6 (60.1)	20.5 (68.9)	22.7 (72.9)	21.1 (70.0)	14.0 (57.2)	6.2 (43.2)	−2.0 (28.4)	−8.6 (16.5)	6.0 (42.8)
Mean daily minimum °C (°F)	−14.1 (6.6)	−14.5 (5.9)	−7.7 (18.1)	1.8 (35.2)	8.6 (47.5)	13.1 (55.6)	15.3 (59.5)	13.7 (56.7)	7.4 (45.3)	1.5 (34.7)	−5.0 (23.0)	−11.9 (10.6)	0.7 (33.3)
Average precipitation mm (inches)	23.3 (0.92)	19.8 (0.78)	19.8 (0.78)	24.2 (0.95)	26.4 (1.04)	38.6 (1.52)	26.2 (1.03)	20.3 (0.80)	23.7 (0.93)	33.6 (1.32)	25.3 (1.00)	22.0 (0.87)	303.2 (11.94)
Average precipitation days (≥ 1.0 mm)	6.0	5.0	5.0	4.7	4.7	5.8	3.7	3.3	4.4	6.0	5.9	6.4	60.9
Source: NOAA
