= Terekti District =

Coordinates: 51°08′24″N 51°52′48″E

Terekti Теректі
- District
- Теректі ауданы
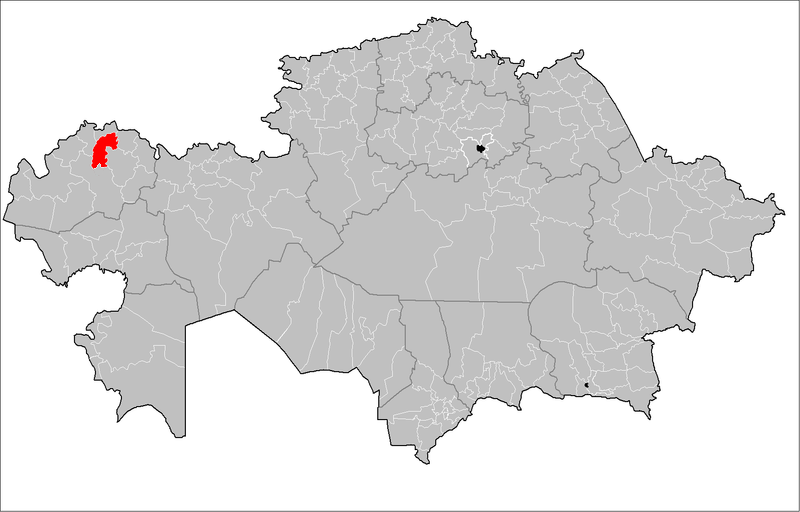
- Location of Terekti District in Kazakhstan
- Country: Kazakhstan
- Region: West Kazakhstan Region
- Administrative center: Terekti

Government
  - Akim: Gabdushev Tlekkabyl Alexandrovich

Population (2013)
  - Total: 38,284
- Time zone: UTC+5 (West)

Terekti (Kazakh: Теректі ауданы, Terektı audany) is a district of West Kazakhstan Region in western Kazakhstan. The administrative center of the district is the selo of Terekti. Population: 38,284 (2013 estimate); 39,463 (2009 census results); 44,603 (1999 census results).

== Geography ==
Lake Shalkar is located in the district.
