= Akzhaik, Atyrau =

Akzhaik
- village
- Location within Kazakhstan
- Coordinates: 47°4′0″N 51°52′16″E
- Country: Kazakhstan
- Region: Atyrau Region
- City: Atyrau

Population (2009)
  - Total: 2,191
- Time zone: UTC+7

Akzhaik (Kazakh: Ақжайық Russian: Акжайык) is a village under the administrative jurisdiction of the city of Atyrau in the Atyrau Region, Kazakhstan. Population: 2,191 (2009 census results);.
