= Karatobe District =

Coordinates: 49°44′24″N 53°32′24″E

Karatobe Қаратөбе
- District
- Қаратөбе ауданы
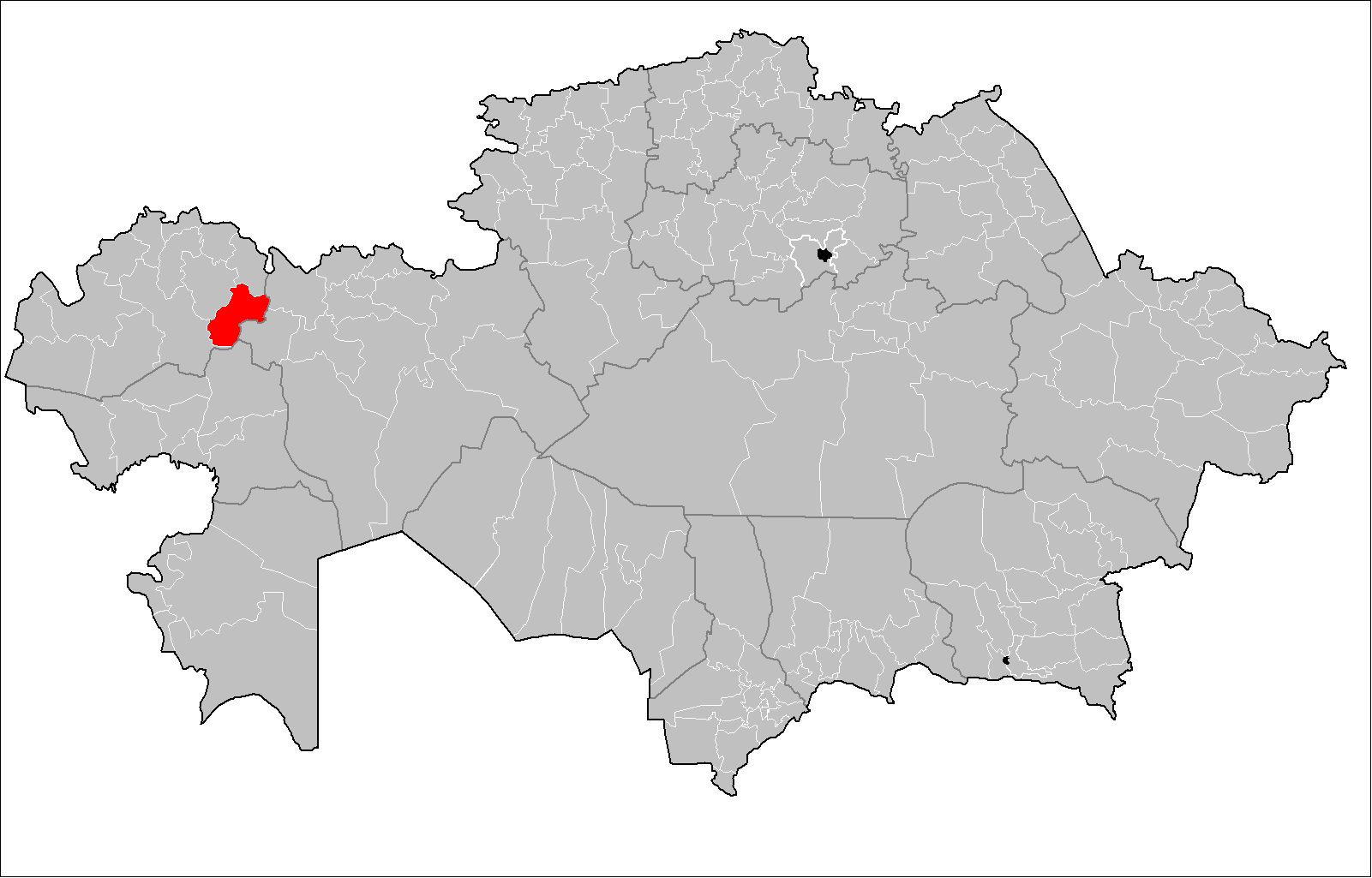
- Location of Karatobe District in Kazakhstan
- Country: Kazakhstan
- Region: West Kazakhstan Region
- Administrative center: Karatobe

Government
  - Akim: Suyeugaliev Kadyrzhan Orynbasarovich

Population (2013)
  - Total: 16,281
- Time zone: UTC+5 (West)

Karatobe (Kazakh: Қаратөбе ауданы; Qaratöbe audany) is a district of West Kazakhstan Region in western Kazakhstan. The administrative center of the district is the selo of Karatobe. Population: 16,281 (2013 estimate); 16,879 (2009 census results); 21,115 (1999 census results).

== Geography ==
Karatobe District lies at the northern edge of the Caspian Depression. The Buldyrty and Kaldygaity rivers flow across the territory of the district.
