= Syrym District =

Coordinates: 50°15′00″N 52°33′36″E

Syrym Сырым
- District
- Сырым ауданы
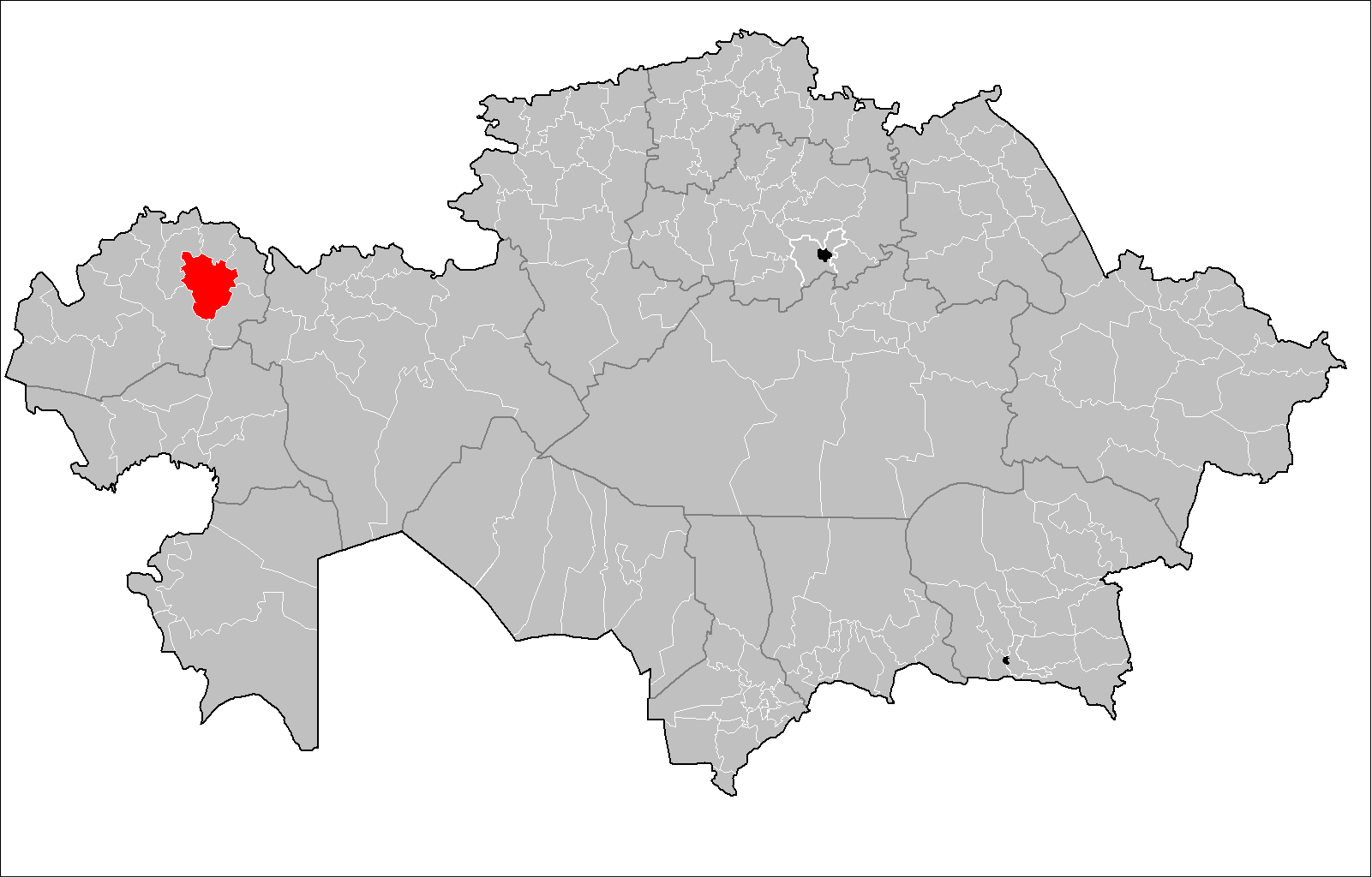
- Location of Syrym District in Kazakhstan
- Country: Kazakhstan
- Region: West Kazakhstan Region
- Administrative center: Zhympity

Population (2013)
  - Total: 20,652
- Time zone: UTC+5 (West)

Syrym (Kazakh: Сырым ауданы, Syrym audany) is a district of West Kazakhstan Region in western Kazakhstan. The administrative center of the district is the auyl of Zhympity. Population: 20,652 (2013 estimate); 21,575 (2009 census results); 30,569 (1999 census results).

== History ==
It was formed as the Dzhambeytinsky district. In 1992, it was renamed Syrymsky district in honor of batyr Syrym Datov.

== Geography ==
Syrym District lies in a flat area north of the Caspian Depression. The Buldyrty (Бұлдырты) and Olenti rivers flow across the territory of the district.
