= Shalkar (Terekti District) =

Lake in Kazakhstan

- Шалқар
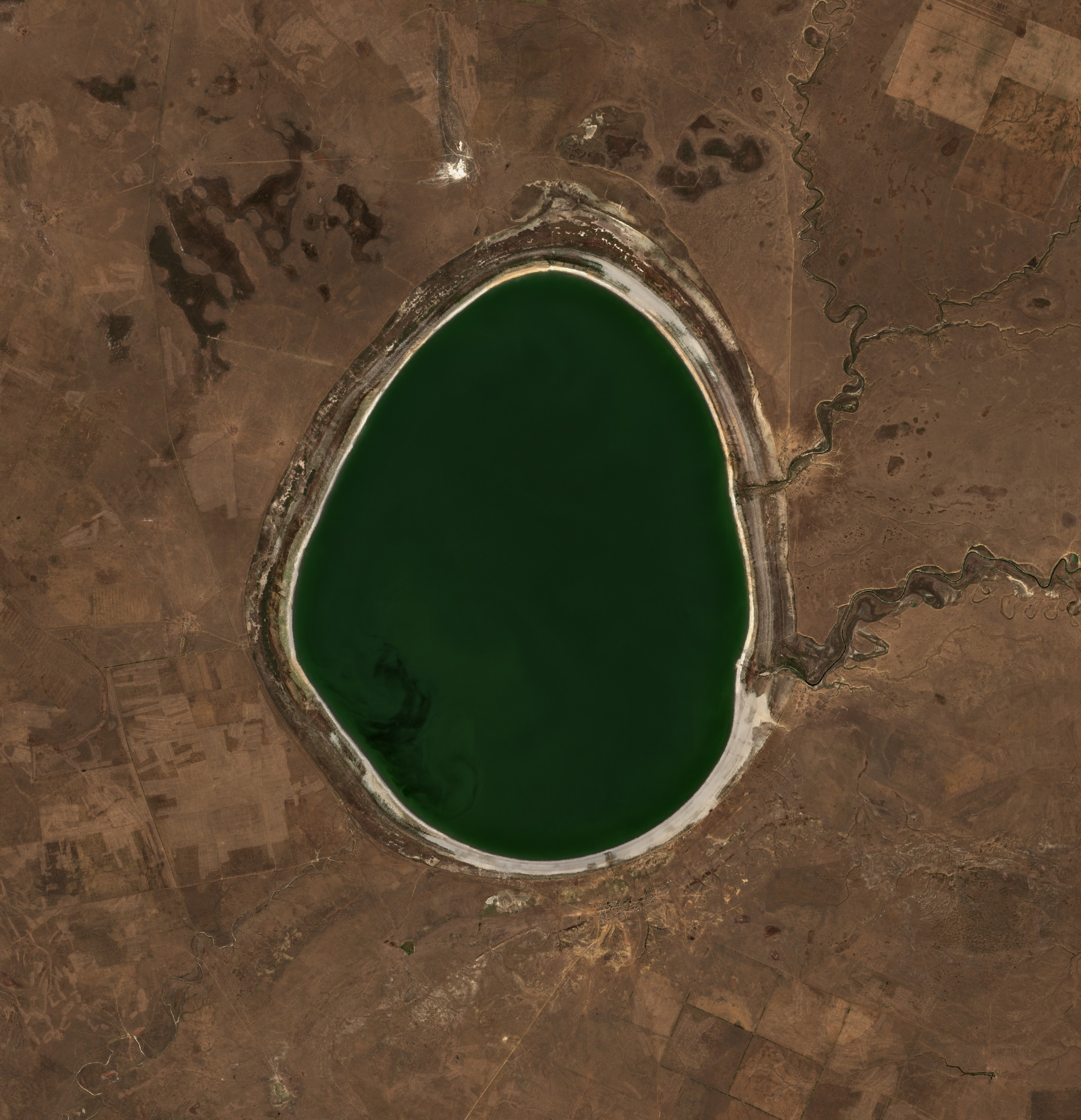
- Sentinel-2 image of Shalkar in 2021

- Location within Kazakhstan
- Location: Caspian Lowland
- Coordinates: 50°33′N 51°41′E
- Type: brackish
- Primary inflows: Sholakankaty and Yesenankaty
- Primary outflows: Solyanka
- Basin countries: Kazakhstan
- Max. length: 18.4 kilometers (11.4 mi)
- Max. width: 14.7 kilometers (9.1 mi)
- Surface area: 205.8 square kilometers (79.5 sq mi) to 200 square kilometers (77 sq mi)
- Average depth: 5.1 meters (17 ft)
- Max. depth: 13 meters (43 ft)
- Surface elevation: 17.5 meters (57 ft)

Shalkar (Kazakh: Шалқар; Russian: Шалкар) is a brackish lake in Terekti District, West Kazakhstan Region, Kazakhstan.

The lake lies about 70 kilometers (43 mi) to the SSE of the city of Oral. Shalkar lake is an important bird area.

== Geography ==
Lake Shalkar lies at the bottom of a depression located in the northernmost sector of the Caspian Lowland. It is a brackish lake bound by salt marshes on the northern side.

The lake is fed by snow, as well as groundwater. It freezes in November and stays under ice until May. The main inflowing rivers are the Sholakankaty and Yesenankaty, having their mouths in the eastern shore. The outflowing Solyanka connects the lake basin with the Ural River basin and is mostly dry.

== Flora and fauna ==
Among the fish species found in the lake, bream, carp, tench, perch, pike, catfish and gudgeon deserve mention. There are reed thickets on the Shalkar shores and in the areas of the river mouths. These provide a habitat for birds such as swans, geese, ducks, flamingos, seagulls and herons, among others.

== See also ==
- List of lakes of Kazakhstan
