= Bayterek, Almaty Region =

Bayterek Бәйтерек
- Town
- Location in Kazakhstan
- Coordinates: 43°24′10″N 77°13′30″E
- Country: Kazakhstan
- Region: Almaty Region
- District: Enbekshikazakh District

Population (2009)
  - Total: 9,679
- Time zone: UTC+6 (Omsk Time)

Bayterek (Kazakh: Бәйтерек, Báıterek), previously Novoalekseevka, is a small town in Almaty Region, in south-eastern Kazakhstan. Population 4731 (1979).
