= Bayterek District =

Coordinates: 51°12′36″N 50°52′12″E

Bayterek Бәйтерек
- District
- Бәйтерек ауданы
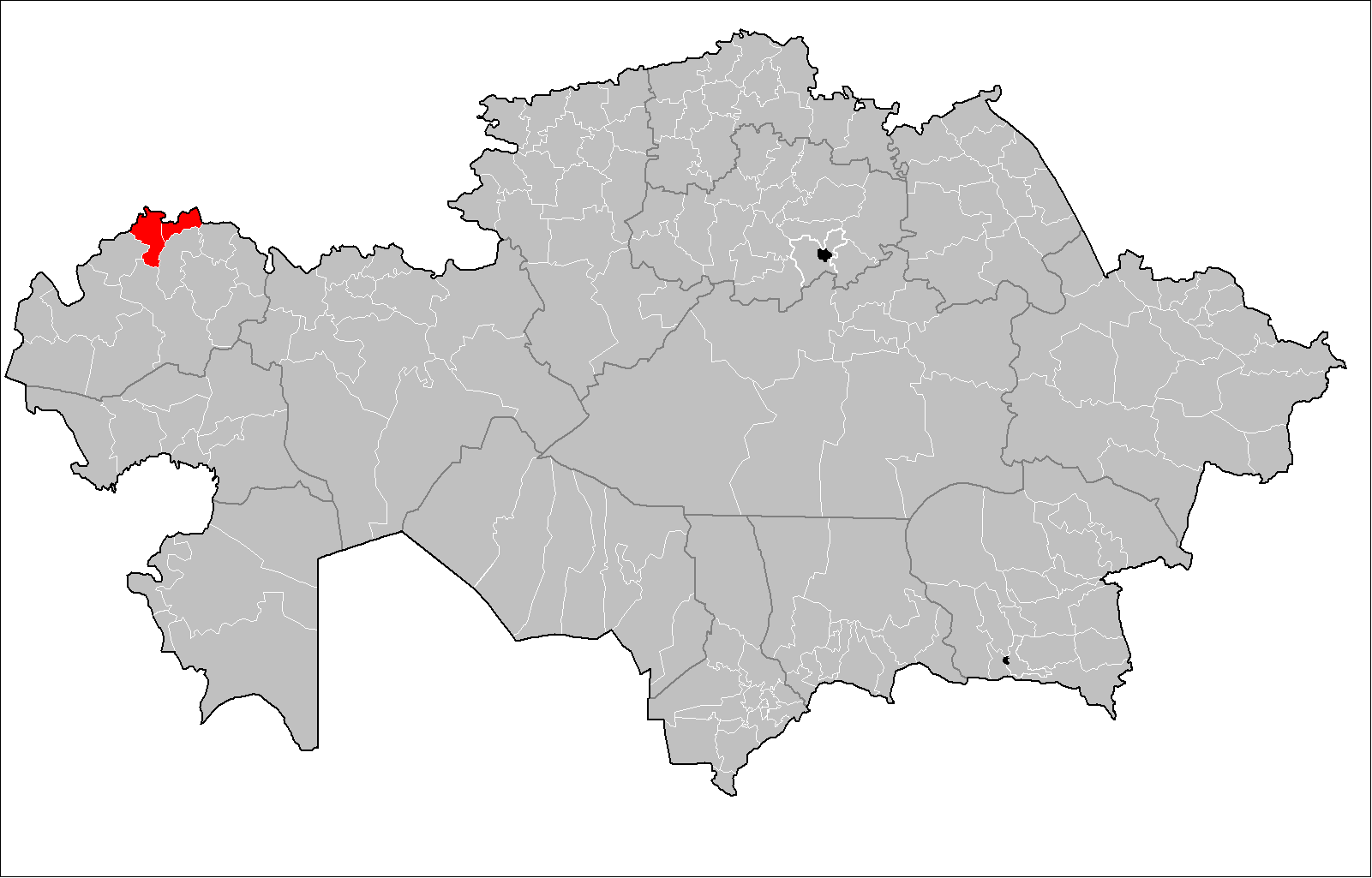
- Location of Zelenov District in Kazakhstan
- Country: Kazakhstan
- Region: West Kazakhstan Region
- Administrative center: Peremyotnoye

Government
  - Akim: Tokzhanov Marat Lukpanovich

Population (2013)
  - Total: 54,831
- Time zone: UTC+5 (West)

Bayterek (Kazakh: Бәйтерек ауданы, Bäiterek audany), previously Zelenov is a district of West Kazakhstan Region in western Kazakhstan. The administrative center of the district is the selo of Peremyotnoye. Population: 54,831 (2013 estimate); 55,420 (2009 census results); 56,611 (1999 census results).
