= Akzhaik District =

Coordinates: 49.714°N 51.662°E

Akzhaik Ақжайық
- District
- Ақжайық ауданы
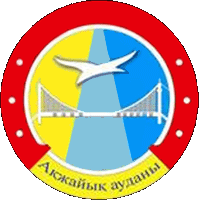
- Coat of arms

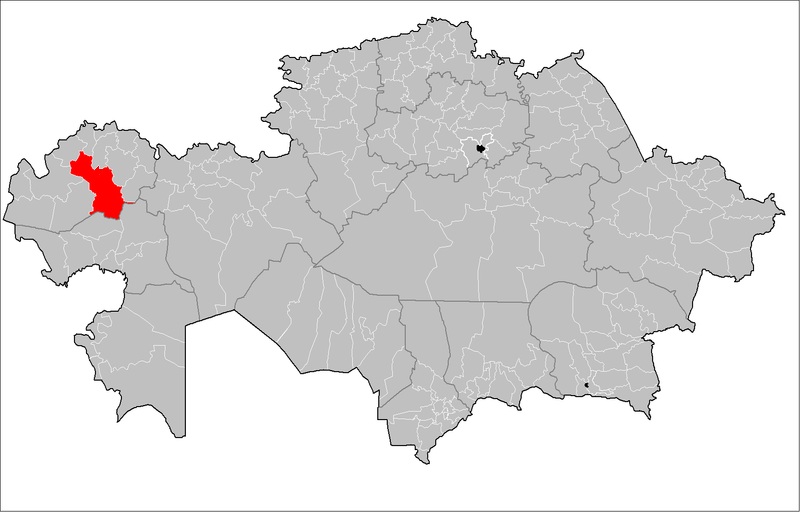
- Location of Akzhaik District in Kazakhstan
- Country: Kazakhstan
- Region: West Kazakhstan Region
- Administrative center: Chapaev

Government
  - Akim: Murat Serdalin

Area
  - Total: 17,600 sq mi (45,500 km^{2})

Population (2013)
  - Total: 41,067
- Time zone: UTC+5 (West)

Akzhaik (Kazakh: Ақжайық ауданы, Aqjaiyq audany) is a district of West Kazakhstan Region in western Kazakhstan. The administrative center of the district is the selo of Chapaev. Population: 41,067 (2013 estimate); 41,777 (2009 census results); 49,364 (1999 census results).

As of 2005 the district had an area of 45,500 km^{2}.

== Geography ==
Akzhaik District lies in the Caspian Depression. The Ural, Bagyrlai (Бағырлай), Kushum (Көшім), Uil, and Olenti rivers flow across the territory of the district.
