= West Kazakhstan Region =

Region in western Kazakhstan

West Kazakhstan Region Батыс Қазақстан облысы (Kazakh) Западно-Казахстанская область (Russian)
- Region
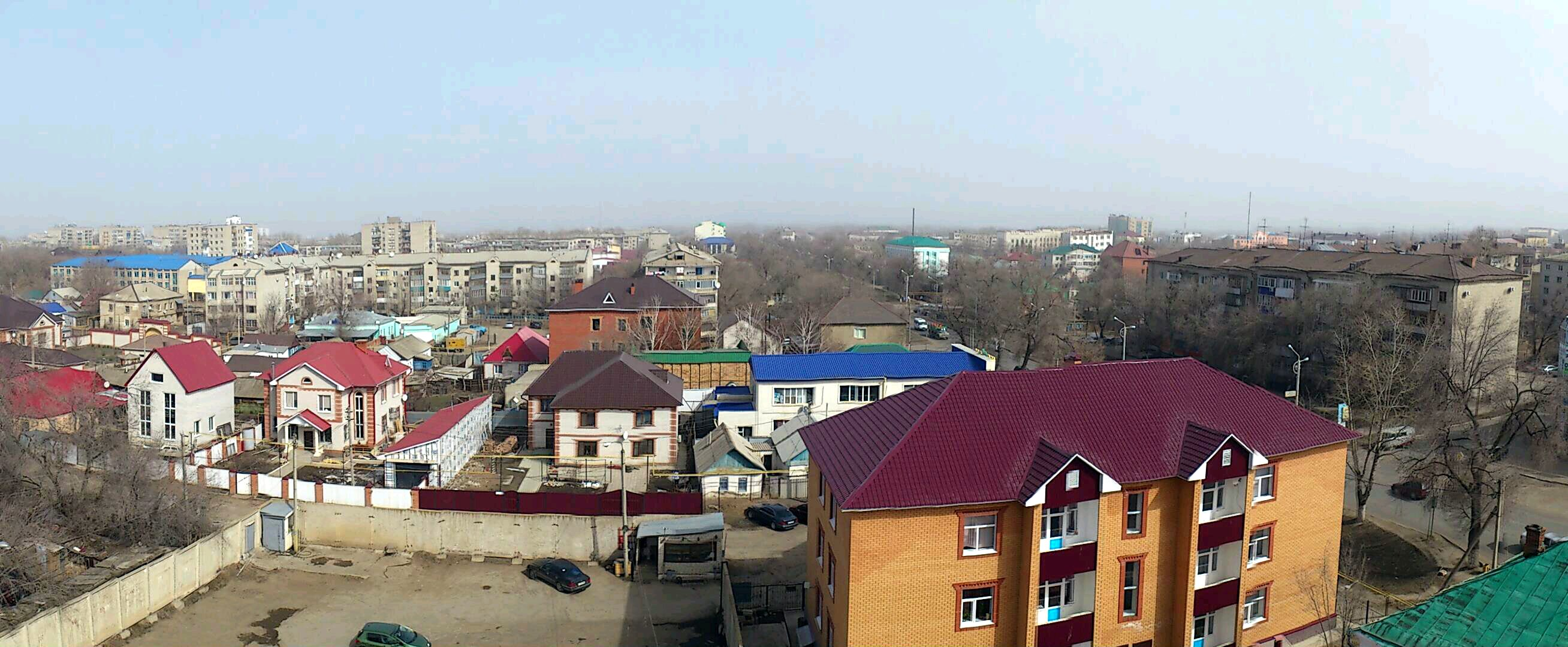
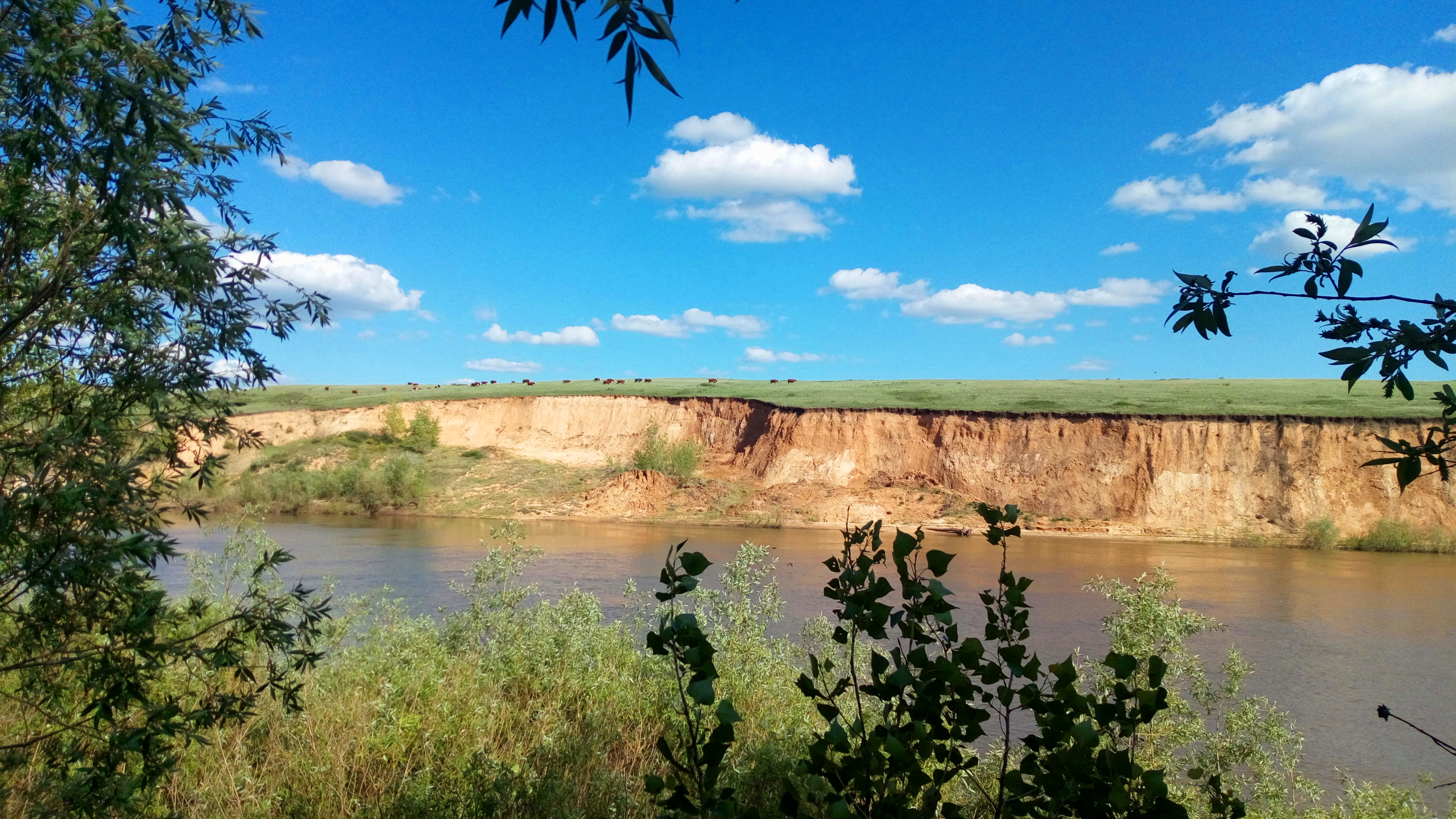
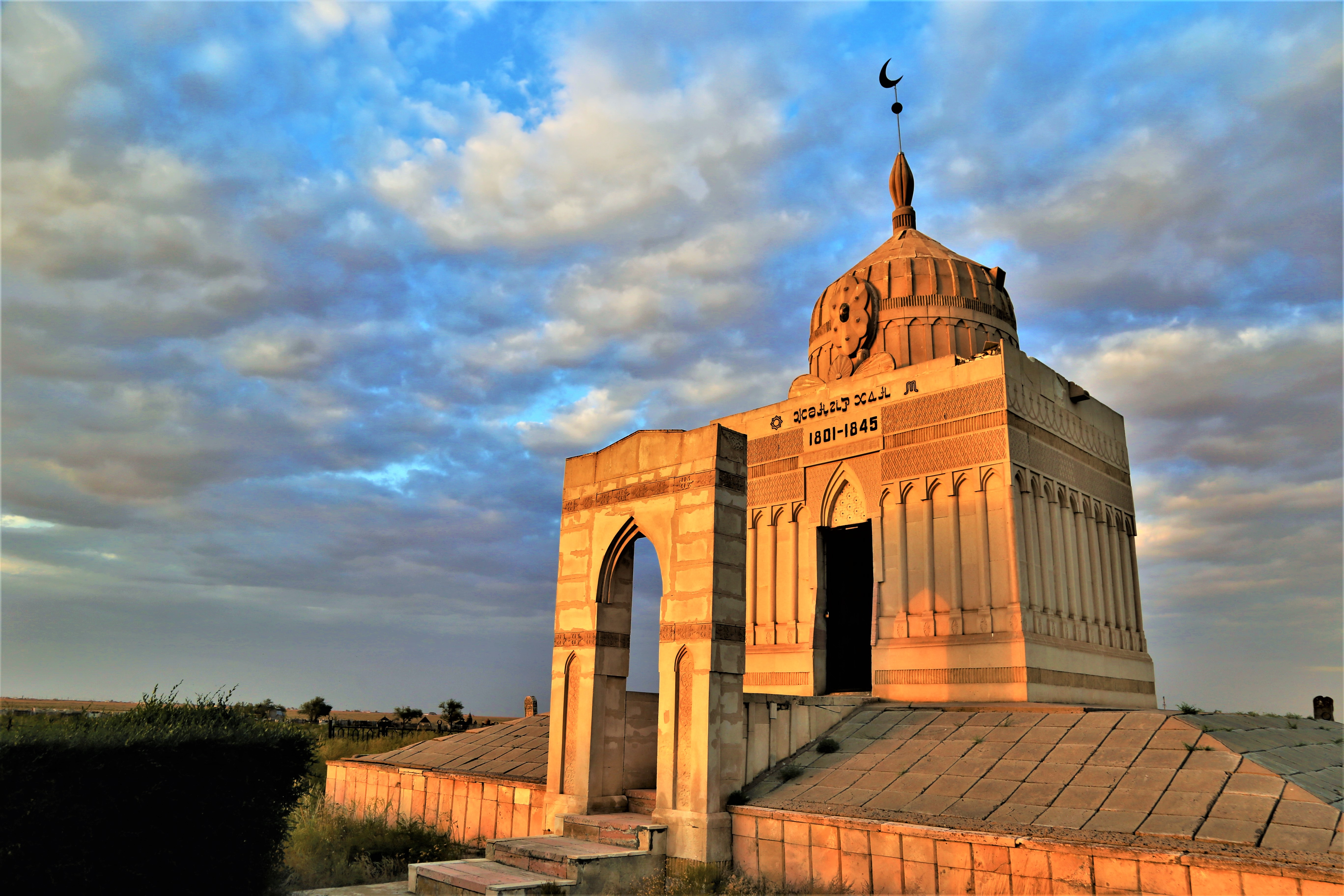
- From the top, Oral, Kirsanov Sanctuary, Zhangir Khan Mausoleum

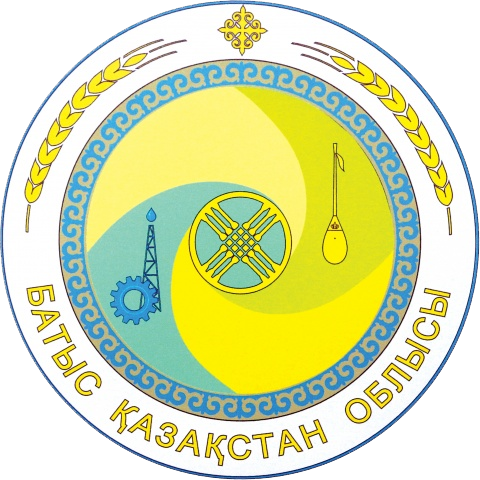
- Coat of arms

- Map of Kazakhstan, location of West Kazakhstan Region highlighted
- Coordinates: 51°14′N 51°22′E
- Country: Kazakhstan
- Capital: Oral

Government
  - Akim: Nariman Turegaliev

Area
  - Total: 151,339 km^{2} (58,432 sq mi)

Population (2025)
  - Total: 695,900
  - Density: 4.598/km^{2} (11.91/sq mi)

GDP (Nominal, 2024)
  - Total: KZT 4,748 billion (US$ 9.971 billion) · 11th
  - Per capita: KZT 6,835,300 (US$ 14,354)
- Time zone: UTC+5
  - Summer (DST): UTC+5 (not observed)
- Postal codes: 090000
- Area codes: +7 (711)
- ISO 3166 code: KZ-ZAP
- Vehicle registration: 07, L
- Districts: 12
- Cities: 2
- Villages: 512
- HDI (2022): 0.794 high · 4th
- Website: bko.gov.kz/en/

West Kazakhstan Region (Note: Kazakh: Батыс Қазақстан облысы, romanized: Batys Qazaqstan oblysy; Russian: Западно-Казахстанская область) is a region of Kazakhstan. As of 1 August 2025, it had a population of 695,900. Its administrative centre is Oral (also known as Uralsk), a city of about 250,000 inhabitants.

The region was created as West Kazakhstan Oblast in the Kazakh Soviet Socialist Republic during the Soviet-era. Between 1962 and 1992, it was named Uralsk Oblast. It was renamed in 1993 following the independence of Kazakhstan from the Soviet Union.

== Geography ==
The region borders Russia and is near the Ural Mountains. The Ural River is the border between Asia and Europe and flows from Russia to the Caspian Sea through the region, meaning the extreme west of Kazakhstan is in Eastern Europe. West Kazakhstan region borders Aktobe Region to the east and Atyrau Region to the south, in addition to the following Russian Oblasts: Astrakhan Oblast to the south-west, Volgograd Oblast to the west, Saratov Oblast to the north-west, Samara Oblast to the north and Orenburg Oblast to the north-east.

It is traversed by the northeasterly line of equal latitude and longitude. There are numerous lakes in the region, including Shalkar, Balykty Sarkyl, Botkul and Aralsor.

== Demographics ==
As of July 1, 2024, West Kazakhstan Region has a population of 695,000.

Ethnic groups (2020):

- Kazakh: 76.83%
- Russian: 18.86%
- Ukrainian: 1.36%
- Tatar: 1.28%
- Others: 1.67%

== Administrative divisions ==
The region is divided into twelve districts and the city of Oral.

Name	Population (2019)	Area (km²)	Density (/km^{2})	Capital	Continent
Oral	314,657	731	430.45	Oral	Europe
Akzhaik	40,102	25,200	1.59	Chapaev	both
Bokey Orda	15,026	19,200	0.78	Saykyn	Europe
Borili	56,533	5,600	10.10	Aksay	Asia
Kaztal	28,823	18,600	1.55	Kaztal	Europe
Karatobe	15,328	10,000	1.53	Karatobe	Asia
Zhanakala	24,023	20,800	1.15	Zhanakala	Europe
Zhanybek	16,083	8,200	1.96	Zhanybek	Europe
Shyngyrlau	14,598	7,200	2.03	Shyngyrlau	Asia
Bayterek	58,595	7,400	7.92	Peremyotnoye	Europe
Syrym	18,520	11,900	1.56	Zhympity	Asia
Taskala	16,582	8,100	2.05	Taskala	Europe
Terekti	37,974	8,400	4.52	Fyodorovka	both

Two localities in the region have town status. These are Oral and Aksay.

== Economy ==
In the first half of 2019, the gross regional product amounted to ₸1.4 trillion, an increase of ₸145 million from the previous year. For 9 months of this year, industrial output amounted to almost ₸1.8 trillion. For the first quarter of 2020, the West Kazakhstan Region reported an unemployment rate of 4.8%, and an average monthly salary of ₸186,857.

The development of the agro-industrial complex is also one of the drivers of the region’s economy. During the first half of 2020, the gross agricultural production of the region totaled ₸59.8252 billion, of which ₸59.6761 billion came from livestock farming, and the remaining amount coming from crop production and various agricultural services. The main crops grown in the region include wheat, barley, sunflower, safflower, and potatoes. As of July 1, 2020, the region has approximately 691,800 heads of cattle, 227,100 horses, 1.63 million heads of poultry, 1.21 million heads of sheep, 243,900 goats, 16,200 pigs, and 2,300 camels. There are 196 agricultural cooperatives registered in the region.

In general, today 42 large new investment projects worth over ₸1 trillion are being implemented in the region, creating about 5,000 jobs. As of 2020, the region has 7 large-scale investment projects with foreign participation, totaling about ₸1.9 trillion, and projected by the regional government to create more than 500 jobs.

== Culture ==
The West Kazakhstan Region has a rich historical and cultural heritage. In the region, there are more than 6,000 historical and archaeological sites of different eras and more than 500 historical, architectural and art monuments, 14 of which are monuments of national significance. In the field of culture and art of the region there are 717 state-run organizations. In order to study, preserve and popularize the historical and cultural heritage in the region there are 24 museums in the region, including 2 private ones, and 13 in rural areas. At the end of 2019, the region was home to 364 libraries, of which, 340 were in rural areas, hosting 1,303,352 visitors and 5,819,524 works. The region's libraries are in a process of digitalizing their works, with 4,642 books and 175 other works being digitalized in the first half of 2020. The region is also home to 263 cultural centers, 237 of which are located in rural areas.

== Sport ==
The capital Oral is home to Kazakhstan's only professional bandy club, Akzhaiyk. In 2016 the national championship was won by the regional team and in the variety rink bandy, a national title was obtained in 2014.
