= Selyanka =

Selyanka Селянка
- Khutor
- Location within Volgograd Oblast Location within Russia
- Coordinates: 50°07′N 46°34′E
- Country: Russia
- Region: Volgograd Oblast
- District: Pallasovsky District
- Time zone: UTC+4:00

Selyanka (Russian: Селянка) is a rural locality (a khutor) in Romashkovksoye Rural Settlement, Pallasovsky District, Volgograd Oblast, Russia. The population was 40 as of 2010. There are 2 streets.

== History ==
The village was founded as Frankreich in 1861 by the Volga German colonists resettling from Galka. The parish was Lutheran and it was severely effected by the Povolzhye famine in 1921.

== Geography ==
Selyanka is located on the Caspian Depression, 27 km northwest of Pallasovka (the district's administrative centre) by road. Zavolzhsky is the nearest rural locality.
