= Aralsor =

Lake in Kazakhstan

- Аралсор
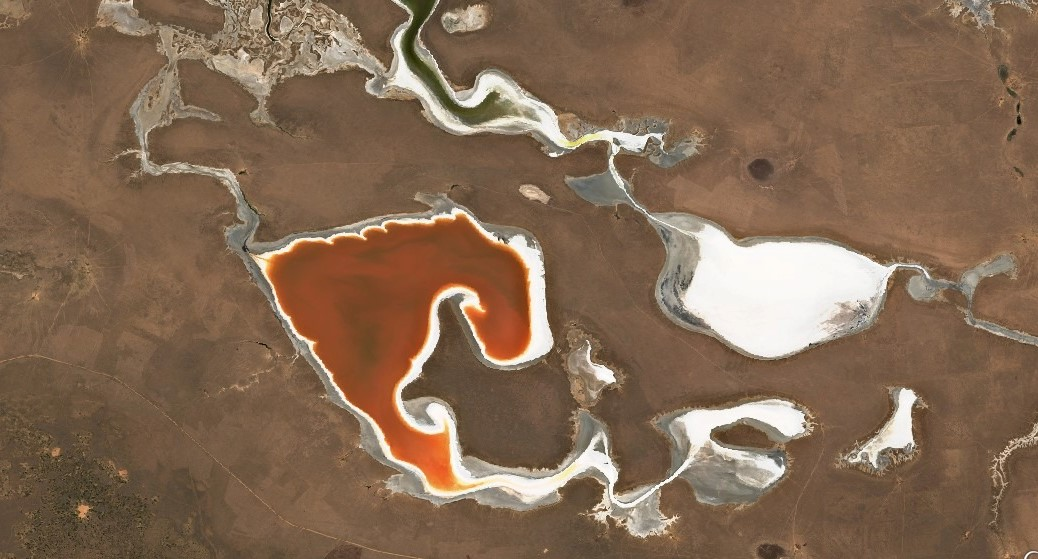
- Sentinel-2 image of Aralsor in 2024

- Location within Kazakhstan
- Location: Caspian Lowland
- Coordinates: 49°04′N 48°11′E
- Type: endorheic
- Primary inflows: Ashchyozek
- Basin countries: Kazakhstan
- Max. length: 34.3 kilometers (21.3 mi)
- Max. width: 13 kilometers (8.1 mi)
- Surface area: 124 square kilometers (48 sq mi) to 200 square kilometers (77 sq mi)
- Surface elevation: 1.6 meters (5 ft 3 in)

Aralsor (Kazakh: Аралсор; Russian: Аралсор) is a bittern salt lake group in Bokey Orda District, West Kazakhstan Region, Kazakhstan.

The lake lies about 80 kilometers (50 mi) to the east of the Russian border, north of the R-97 Highway (Kazakhstan). The road connects Saykyn station of the Volga Railway near lake Botkul with the village of Taipak on the right bank of the Ural River. Salt extraction on an industrial scale is carried out at the lake.

== Geography ==
Lying at the northern edge of the Ryn Desert, east of the Russian border, Aralsor is an endorheic lake group. The main water body is colored pink and is surrounded by a string of smaller lakes and salt pans. The latter contain clay salt-mud deposits covered with a crust of halite reaching 0.3 meters (1 ft 0 in). The western and eastern banks of Aralsor are steep and cliff-like in places.

Flowing from the north, the Ashchyozek is the main river in the area. A short channel connects the end of the river with Aralsor. This channel is periodically dry. The Kamys-Samar Lakes lie to the east.

== Flora and fauna ==
There is desert and steppe vegetation in the terraced flat areas of the Aralsor lakeside cliff-like formations. In the ravines of the shoreline cliffs there are plants such as tamarisk, anabasis, Halocnemum and winterfat, providing a habitat and breeding ground for the local fauna of small mammals, birds and reptiles.

== See also ==
- List of lakes of Kazakhstan
- Pink lake
