= Gormaki =

Gormaki Гормаки
- Khutor
- Location within Volgograd Oblast Location within Russia
- Coordinates: 49°39′N 46°05′E
- Country: Russia
- Region: Volgograd Oblast
- District: Pallasovsky District
- Time zone: UTC+4:00

Gormaki (Russian: Гормаки) is a rural locality (a khutor) in Revolyutsionnoye Rural Settlement, Pallasovsky District, Volgograd Oblast, Russia. The population was 180 as of 2010. There are 5 streets.

== Geography ==
Gormaki is located on the Caspian Depression, 101 km southwest of Pallasovka (the district's administrative centre) by road. Sadovoye is the nearest rural locality.
