= Yesin =

Yesin Есин
- Khutor
- Location within Volgograd Oblast Location within Russia
- Coordinates: 49°45′N 46°43′E
- Country: Russia
- Region: Volgograd Oblast
- District: Pallasovsky District
- Time zone: UTC+4:00

Yesin (Russian: Есин) is a rural locality (a khutor) in Kaysatskoye Rural Settlement, Pallasovsky District, Volgograd Oblast, Russia. The population was 110 as of 2010. There are 3 streets.

== Geography ==
Yesin is located in steppe, on the Caspian Depression, on the right bank of the Torgun River, 49 km southwest of Pallasovka (the district's administrative centre) by road. Kaysatskoye is the nearest rural locality.
