= Sapunkov =

Sapunkov Сапунков
- Khutor
- Location within Volgograd Oblast Location within Russia
- Coordinates: 49°50′N 46°22′E
- Country: Russia
- Region: Volgograd Oblast
- District: Pallasovsky District
- Time zone: UTC+4:00

Sapunkov (Russian: Сапунков) is a rural locality (a khutor) in Goncharovskoye Rural Settlement, Pallasovsky District, Volgograd Oblast, Russia. The population was 100 as of 2010. There are 3 streets.

== Geography ==
Sapunkov is located in steppe, on the Caspian Depression, 51 km southwest of Pallasovka (the district's administrative centre) by road. Kobzev is the nearest rural locality.
