= Khudushny =

Khudushny Худушный
- Khutor
- Location within Volgograd Oblast Location within Russia
- Coordinates: 49°54′N 46°47′E
- Country: Russia
- Region: Volgograd Oblast
- District: Pallasovsky District
- Time zone: UTC+4:00

Khudushny (Russian: Худушный) is a rural locality (a khutor) in Kalashnikovskoye Rural Settlement, Pallasovsky District, Volgograd Oblast, Russia. The population was 139 as of 2010. There are 5 streets.

== Geography ==
Khudushny is located in steppe, on the Caspian Depression, 19 km southwest of Pallasovka (the district's administrative centre) by road. Kalashniki is the nearest rural locality.
