= Zolotari =

Zolotari Золотари
- Settlement
- Location within Volgograd Oblast Location within Russia
- Coordinates: 49°45′N 46°27′E
- Country: Russia
- Region: Volgograd Oblast
- District: Pallasovsky District
- Time zone: UTC+4:00

Zolotari (Russian: Золотари) is a rural locality (a settlement) and the administrative center of Goncharovskoye Rural Settlement, Pallasovsky District, Volgograd Oblast, Russia. The population was 1,394 as of 2010. There are 37 streets.

== Geography ==
Zolotari is located in on the Caspian Depression, 69 km southwest of Pallasovka (the district's administrative centre) by road. Gonchary is the nearest rural locality.
