= Staraya Ivantsovka =

Staraya Ivantsovka Старая Иванцовка
- Selo
- Location within Volgograd Oblast Location within Russia
- Coordinates: 50°02′N 46°42′E
- Country: Russia
- Region: Volgograd Oblast
- District: Pallasovsky District
- Time zone: UTC+4:00

Staraya Ivantsovka (Russian: Старая Иванцовка) is a rural locality (a selo) in Zavolzhskoye Rural Settlement, Pallasovsky District, Volgograd Oblast, Russia. The population was 555 as of 2010. There are 8 streets.

== Geography ==
Staraya Ivantsovka is located on the Caspian Depression, on the right bank of the Torgun River, 16 km west of Pallasovka (the district's administrative centre) by road. Novaya Ivantsovka is the nearest rural locality.
