= Korolyovka =

Korolyovka Королёвка
- Khutor
- Location within Volgograd Oblast Location within Russia
- Coordinates: 49°46′N 46°49′E
- Country: Russia
- Region: Volgograd Oblast
- District: Pallasovsky District
- Time zone: UTC+4:00

Korolyovka (Russian: Королёвка) is a rural locality (a khutor) in Kaysatskoye Rural Settlement, Pallasovsky District, Volgograd Oblast, Russia. The population was 11 as of 2010.

== Geography ==
Korolyovka is located in steppe, on the Caspian Depression, 35 km south of Pallasovka (the district's administrative centre) by road. Kaysatskoye is the nearest rural locality.
