= Sadchikov =

Sadchikov Садчиков
- Khutor
- Location within Volgograd Oblast Location within Russia
- Coordinates: 49°37′N 46°29′E
- Country: Russia
- Region: Volgograd Oblast
- District: Pallasovsky District
- Time zone: UTC+4:00

Sadchikov (Russian: Садчиков) is a rural locality (a khutor) in Revolyutsionnoye Rural Settlement, Pallasovsky District, Volgograd Oblast, Russia. The population was 94 as of 2010. There are 2 streets.

== Geography ==
Sadchikov is located in steppe, on the Caspian Depression, 100 km southwest of Pallasovka (the district's administrative centre) by road. Prudentov is the nearest rural locality.
