= Vengelovka =

Vengelovka Венгеловка
- Settlement
- Location within Volgograd Oblast Location within Russia
- Coordinates: 49°17′N 46°48′E
- Country: Russia
- Region: Volgograd Oblast
- District: Pallasovsky District
- Time zone: UTC+4:00

Vengelovka (Russian: Венгеловка) is a rural locality (a settlement) in Priozyornoye Rural Settlement, Pallasovsky District, Volgograd Oblast, Russia. The population was 536 as of 2010. There are 5 streets.

== Geography ==
Vengelovka is located on the Caspian Depression, 94 km south of Pallasovka (the district's administrative centre) by road. Put Ilyicha is the nearest rural locality.
