= Novaya Ivantsovka =

Novaya Ivantsovka Новая Иванцовка
- Selo
- Location within Volgograd Oblast Location within Russia
- Coordinates: 50°01′N 46°48′E
- Country: Russia
- Region: Volgograd Oblast
- District: Pallasovsky District
- Time zone: UTC+4:00

Novaya Ivantsovka (Russian: Новая Иванцовка) is a rural locality (a selo) in Zavolzhskoye Rural Settlement, Pallasovsky District, Volgograd Oblast, Russia. The population was 476 as of 2010. There are 5 streets.

== Geography ==
Novaya Ivantsovka is located on the Caspian Depression, on the right bank of the Torgun River, 11 km southwest of Pallasovka (the district's administrative centre) by road. Pallasovka is the nearest rural locality.
