= Kamyshovka, Volgograd Oblast =

Kamyshovka Камышовка
- Khutor
- Location within Volgograd Oblast Location within Russia
- Coordinates: 49°48′N 46°47′E
- Country: Russia
- Region: Volgograd Oblast
- District: Pallasovsky District
- Time zone: UTC+4:00

Kamyshovka (Russian: Камышовка) is a rural locality (a khutor) in Kaysatskoye Rural Settlement, Pallasovsky District, Volgograd Oblast, Russia. The population was 26 as of 2010.

== Geography ==
Kamyshovka is located in steppe, on the Caspian Depression, 31 km southwest of Pallasovka (the district's administrative centre) by road. Korolyovka is the nearest rural locality.
