= Sakharovka, Volgograd Oblast =

Sakharovka Сахаровка
- Khutor
- Location within Volgograd Oblast Location within Russia
- Coordinates: 49°42′N 46°47′E
- Country: Russia
- Region: Volgograd Oblast
- District: Pallasovsky District
- Time zone: UTC+4:00

Sakharovka (Russian: Сахаровка) is a rural locality (a khutor) in Kaysatskoye Rural Settlement, Pallasovsky District, Volgograd Oblast, Russia. The population was 15 as of 2010. There is 1 street.

== Geography ==
Sakharovka is located in steppe, on the Caspian Depression, 45 km south of Pallasovka (the district's administrative centre) by road. Novy is the nearest rural locality.
