= Prudentov =

Prudentov Прудентов
- Khutor
- Location within Volgograd Oblast Location within Russia
- Coordinates: 49°38′N 46°18′E
- Country: Russia
- Region: Volgograd Oblast
- District: Pallasovsky District
- Time zone: UTC+4:00

Prudentov (Russian: Прудентов) is a rural locality (a khutor) and the administrative center of Revolyutsionnoye Rural Settlement, Pallasovsky District, Volgograd Oblast, Russia. The population was 997 as of 2010. There are 18 streets.

== Geography ==
Prudentov is located 87 km southwest of Pallasovka (the district's administrative centre) by road. Zolotari is the nearest rural locality.
