= Maly Uzen =

Maly Uzen Kishi Uzen (Saryozen) Малый Узень / Кіші Өзен
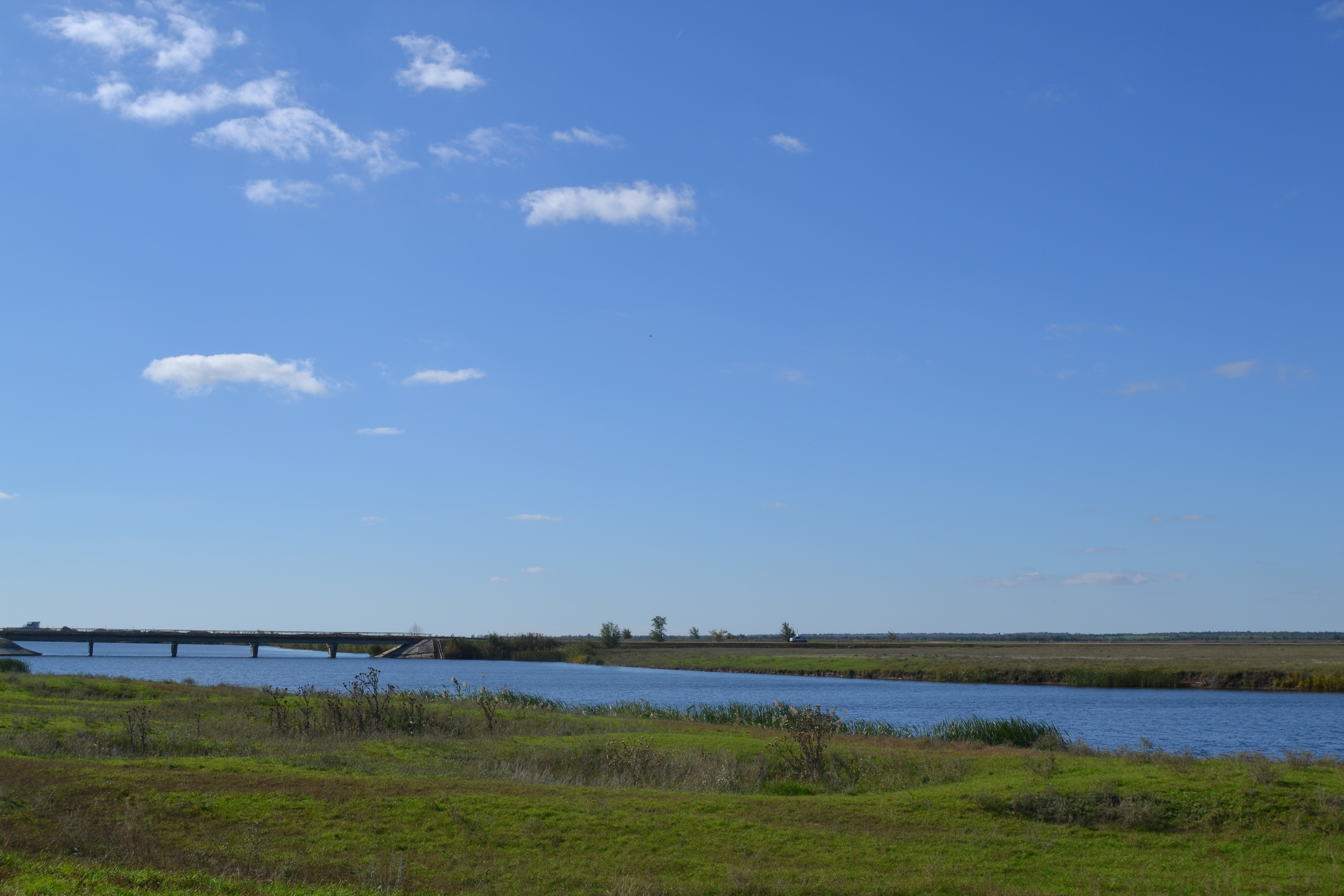
- View of the river at Novotulka

- Mouth location in Kazakhstan

Location
- Countries: Russia; Kazakhstan

Physical characteristics
- Source: Obshchy Syrt
  - coordinates: 51°22′59″N 48°19′05″E
  - elevation: ca 100 m (330 ft)
- Mouth: Saryaydyn, Kamys-Samar Lakes
  - coordinates: 48°56′21″N 49°39′24″E
  - elevation: −8 m (−26 ft)
- Length: 638 km (396 mi)
- Basin size: 18,250 km^{2} (7,050 sq mi)
- Discharge
  - average: 3.4 to 782 cubic metres per second (120 to 27,620 cu ft/s) at Maly Uzen

Maly Uzen (Russian: Малый Узень) or Kishi Uzen (Kazakh: Кіші Өзен, Kıshı Özen; Tatar: Кече Үзән), also known as the Saryozen in Kazakhstan, is a river in Saratov Oblast of Russia and West Kazakhstan Province of Kazakhstan. It is 638 kilometres (396 mi) long, with a drainage basin of 18,250 square kilometres (7,050 mi^{2}), The river is part of the Kazakhstan–Russia border area.

The river is used for water supply and irrigation. Water quality tests conducted in 2005 in the Russian section indicated 'moderately polluted'. A 2011 report by the United Nations Economic Commission for Europe listed the discharge of wastewater, surface run-off, sediments and riverbank erosion as damaging to water quality.

== Course ==
The Maly Uzen has its sources on the western edge of the Obshchy Syrt to the north of Yershov town. It flows in a roughly SSE direction over the steppes of the Caspian Depression. The river runs parallel to the Bolshoy Uzen, some 50 kilometres (31 mi) further east. The Maly Uzen has its mouth in lake Saryaydyn, part of the Kamys-Samar Lakes of West-Kazakhstan. Lake Balykty Sarkyl lies between the Maly Uzen and the Bolshoy Uzen.

Most of the river's waters come from melting snow and its discharge is at its peak in April. Some stretches of the river usually dry up completely in the summer. At Maly Uzen village the discharge varies from 3.4 to 782 cubic metres per second (120 to 27,620 cu ft/s). The Maly Uzen freezes over in December, and stays icebound to the end of March or beginning of April.
