= Elton, Volgograd Oblast =

Elton Эльтон
- Settlement
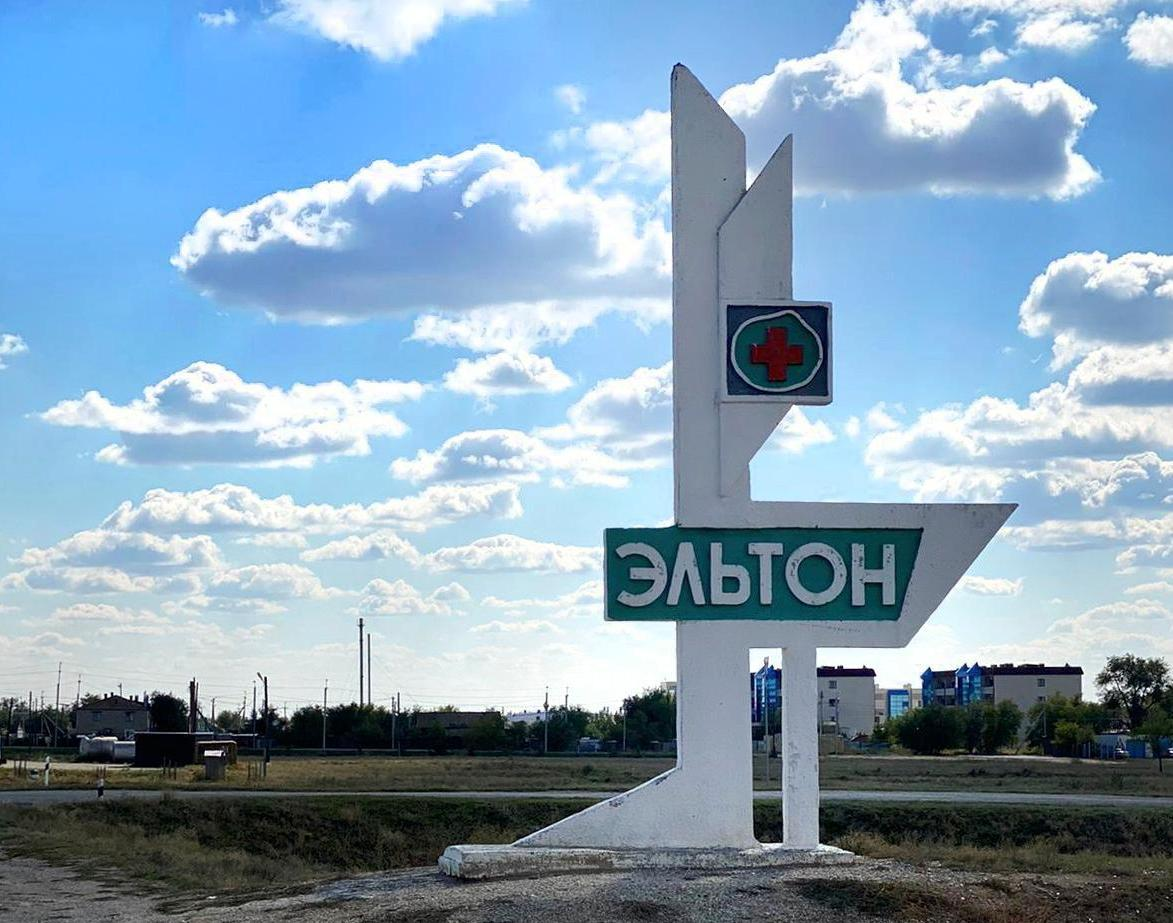
- Elton 001.jpg

- Location within Volgograd Oblast Location within Russia
- Coordinates: 49°07′N 46°50′E
- Country: Russia
- Region: Volgograd Oblast
- District: Pallasovsky District
- Time zone: UTC+3:00

Elton (Russian: Эльтон) is a rural locality (a settlement) and the administrative center of Eltonskoye Rural Settlement, Pallasovsky District, Volgograd Oblast, Russia. The population was 2,723 as of 2010. There are 47 streets.

== Geography ==
Elton is located on the Caspian Depression, 113 km south of Pallasovka (the district's administrative centre) by road. Zhanibek is the nearest rural locality.
