= Kumysolechebnitsa, Pallasovsky District, Volgograd Oblast =

Kumysolechebnitsa Кумысолечебница
- Settlement
- Location within Volgograd Oblast Location within Russia
- Coordinates: 50°10′N 47°11′E
- Country: Russia
- Region: Volgograd Oblast
- District: Pallasovsky District
- Time zone: UTC+4:00

Kumysolechebnitsa (Russian: Кумысолечебница) is a rural locality (a settlement) in Savinskoye Rural Settlement, Pallasovsky District, Volgograd Oblast, Russia. The population was 245 as of 2010. There are 4 streets.

== Geography ==
Kumysolechebnitsa is located on the left bank of the Torgun River, 35 km northeast of Pallasovka (the district's administrative centre) by road. Maximovka is the nearest rural locality.
