= Galka =

Galka may refer to:

- Galka, Perm Krai, a settlement in Russia
- Galka, Volgograd Oblast, a settlement in Russia
- Konrad Gałka (born 1974), a Polish swimmer
- Galka, a race of warriors in Final Fantasy XI
