= Lisunovo =

Lisunovo Лисуново
- Settlement
- Location within Volgograd Oblast Location within Russia
- Coordinates: 50°06′N 47°09′E
- Country: Russia
- Region: Volgograd Oblast
- District: Pallasovsky District
- Time zone: UTC+4:00

Lisunovo (Russian: Лисуново) is a rural locality (a settlement) in Savinskoye Rural Settlement, Pallasovsky District, Volgograd Oblast, Russia. The population was 119 as of 2010. There are 5 streets.

== Geography ==
Lisunovo is located on the right bank of the Torgun River, 41 km northeast of Pallasovka (the district's administrative centre) by road. Smychka is the nearest rural locality.
