= Kalashniki =

Kalashniki Калашники
- Selo
- Location within Volgograd Oblast Location within Russia
- Coordinates: 49°54′N 46°43′E
- Country: Russia
- Region: Volgograd Oblast
- District: Pallasovsky District
- Time zone: UTC+4:00

Kalashniki (Russian: Калашники) is a rural locality (a selo) in Kalashnikovskoye Rural Settlement, Pallasovsky District, Volgograd Oblast, Russia. The population was 143 as of 2010. There are 6 streets.

== Geography ==
Kalashniki is located in steppe, 23 km southwest of Pallasovka (the district's administrative centre) by road. Khudushny is the nearest rural locality.
