= Romashki =

Romashki Ромашки
- Settlement
- Location within Volgograd Oblast Location within Russia
- Coordinates: 50°11′N 46°40′E
- Country: Russia
- Region: Volgograd Oblast
- District: Pallasovsky District
- Time zone: UTC+4:00

Romashki (Russian: Ромашки) is a rural locality (a settlement) and the administrative center of Romashkovksoye Rural Settlement, Pallasovsky District, Volgograd Oblast, Russia. The population was 1,253 as of 2010. There are 11 streets.

== Geography ==
Romashki is located 24 km northwest of Pallasovka (the district's administrative centre) by road. Prigarino is the nearest rural locality.
