= Segorodsky =

Segorodsky Серогодский
- Settlement
- Location within Volgograd Oblast Location within Russia
- Coordinates: 49°56′N 47°02′E
- Country: Russia
- Region: Volgograd Oblast
- District: Pallasovsky District
- Time zone: UTC+4:00

Segorodsky (Russian: Серогодский) is a rural locality (a settlement) in Limannoye Rural Settlement, Pallasovsky District, Volgograd Oblast, Russia. The population was 287 as of 2010. There are 7 streets.

== Geography ==
Segorodsky is located in steppe, 20 km southeast of Pallasovka (the district's administrative centre) by road. Pallasovka is the nearest rural locality.
