= Kalinina, Pallasovsky District, Volgograd Oblast =

Kalinina Калинина
- Settlement
- Location within Volgograd Oblast Location within Russia
- Coordinates: 49°07′N 46°56′E
- Country: Russia
- Region: Volgograd Oblast
- District: Pallasovsky District
- Time zone: UTC+4:00

Kalinina (Russian: Калинина) is a rural locality (a settlement) in Eltonskoye Rural Settlement, Pallasovsky District, Volgograd Oblast, Russia. The population was 179 as of 2010. There are 2 streets.

== Geography ==
Kalinina is located 121 km south of Pallasovka (the district's administrative centre) by road. Elton is the nearest rural locality.
