= Limanny =

Limanny Лиманный
- Settlement
- Location within Volgograd Oblast Location within Russia
- Coordinates: 50°01′N 47°02′E
- Country: Russia
- Region: Volgograd Oblast
- District: Pallasovsky District
- Time zone: UTC+4:00

Limanny (Russian: Лиманный) is a rural locality (a settlement) and the administrative center of Limannoye Rural Settlement, Pallasovsky District, Volgograd Oblast, Russia. The population was 693 as of 2010. There are 11 streets.

== Geography ==
Limanny is located on the left bank of the Torgun River, 17 km east of Pallasovka (the district's administrative centre) by road. Zalivnoy is the nearest rural locality.
