= Balykty Sarkyl =

Lake in Kazakhstan

- Балықты Сарқыл
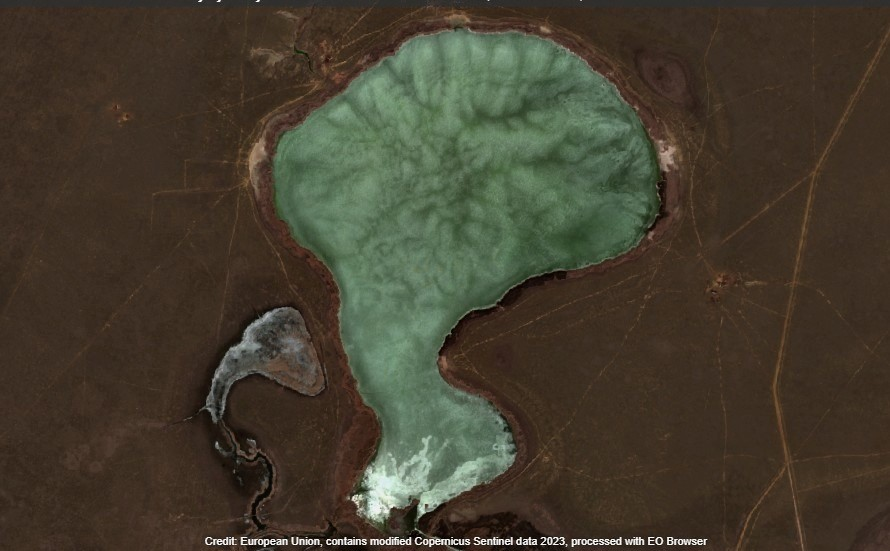
- Balykty Sarkyl Sentinel-2 image in March

- Location within Kazakhstan
- Location: Ural basin
- Coordinates: 49°36′01″N 49°20′33″E
- Primary inflows: Ozek
- Basin countries: Kazakhstan
- Max. length: 6.4 kilometers (4.0 mi)
- Max. width: 4.8 kilometers (3.0 mi)
- Surface area: 60 square kilometers (23 sq mi)
- Average depth: 3.2 meters (10 ft)
- Surface elevation: 4.8 meters (16 ft)
- Islands: none

Balykty Sarkyl (Kazakh: Балықты Сарқыл; Russian: Рыбный Сакрыл) is a brackish lake in Kaztal District, West Kazakhstan Region, Kazakhstan.

The lake lies about 8 kilometers (5.0 mi) southwest of Zhalpaktal village.

== Geography ==
Balykty Sarkyl lies between the Maly Uzen and the Bolshoy Uzen rivers of the Ural basin. The lake is roughly hourglass-shaped with the northern part larger than the southern.

Balykty Sarkyl freezes in November and thaws in early April. River Ozek flows into the lake from the southern end. The lake is located in a semidesert area, to the north of the Kamys-Samar Lakes.

== See also ==
- List of lakes of Kazakhstan
