= Smychka, Volgograd Oblast =

Smychka Смычка
- Khutor
- Location within Volgograd Oblast Location within Russia
- Coordinates: 50°06′N 47°09′E
- Country: Russia
- Region: Volgograd Oblast
- District: Pallasovsky District
- Time zone: UTC+4:00

Smychka (Russian: Смычка) is a rural locality (a khutor) in Savinskoye Rural Settlement, Pallasovsky District, Volgograd Oblast, Russia. The population was 271 as of 2010. There are 3 streets.

== Geography ==
Smychka is located on the left bank of the Torgun River, 24 km northeast of Pallasovka (the district's administrative centre) by road. Savinka is the nearest rural locality.
