= Zalivnoy, Volgograd Oblast =

Zalivnoy Заливной
- Settlement
- Location within Volgograd Oblast Location within Russia
- Coordinates: 50°02′N 47°02′E
- Country: Russia
- Region: Volgograd Oblast
- District: Pallasovsky District
- Time zone: UTC+4:00

Zalivnoy (Russian: Заливной) is a rural locality (a settlement) in Savinskoye Rural Settlement, Pallasovsky District, Volgograd Oblast, Russia. The population was 155 as of 2010. There are 7 streets.

== Geography ==
Zalivnoy is located on the right bank of the Torgun River, 17 km east of Pallasovka (the district's administrative centre) by road. Limanny is the nearest rural locality.
