= Karpov, Volgograd Oblast =

Karpov Карпов
- Khutor
- Location within Volgograd Oblast Location within Russia
- Coordinates: 49°12′N 46°52′E
- Country: Russia
- Region: Volgograd Oblast
- District: Pallasovsky District
- Time zone: UTC+4:00

Karpov (Russian: Карпов) is a rural locality (a khutor) in Eltonskoye Rural Settlement, Pallasovsky District, Volgograd Oblast, Russia. The population was 117 as of 2010. There are 3 streets.

== Geography ==
Karpov is located 13 km from Elton, 105 km south of Pallasovka (the district's administrative centre) by road. Vengelovka is the nearest rural locality.
