= Zyoleny =

Zyoleny Зёленый
- Settlement
- Location within Volgograd Oblast Location within Russia
- Coordinates: 50°01′N 47°00′E
- Country: Russia
- Region: Volgograd Oblast
- District: Pallasovsky District
- Time zone: UTC+4:00

Zyoleny (Russian: Зёленый) is a rural locality (a settlement) in Limannoye Rural Settlement, Pallasovsky District, Volgograd Oblast, Russia. The population was 42 as of 2010. There are 2 streets.

== Geography ==
Zyoleny is located on the Torgun River, 13 km east of Pallasovka (the district's administrative centre) by road. Limanny is the nearest rural locality.
