= Krasny Oktyabr, Pallasovsky District, Volgograd Oblast =

Krasny Oktyabr Красный Октябрь
- Settlement
- Location within Volgograd Oblast Location within Russia
- Coordinates: 49°58′N 46°32′E
- Country: Russia
- Region: Volgograd Oblast
- District: Pallasovsky District
- Time zone: UTC+4:00

Krasny Oktyabr (Russian: Красный Октябрь) is a rural locality (a settlement) and the administrative center of Krasnooktyabrskoye Rural Settlement, Pallasovsky District, Volgograd Oblast, Russia. The population was 1,836 as of 2010. There are 23 streets.

== Geography ==
Krasny Oktyabr is located on the left bank of the Torgun River, 29 km west of Pallasovka (the district's administrative centre) by road. Staraya Ivantsovka is the nearest rural locality.
