= Bolshoy Uzen =

Bolshoy Uzen Ulken Uzen (Karaozen) Большой Узень Үлкен Өзен (Қараөзен)
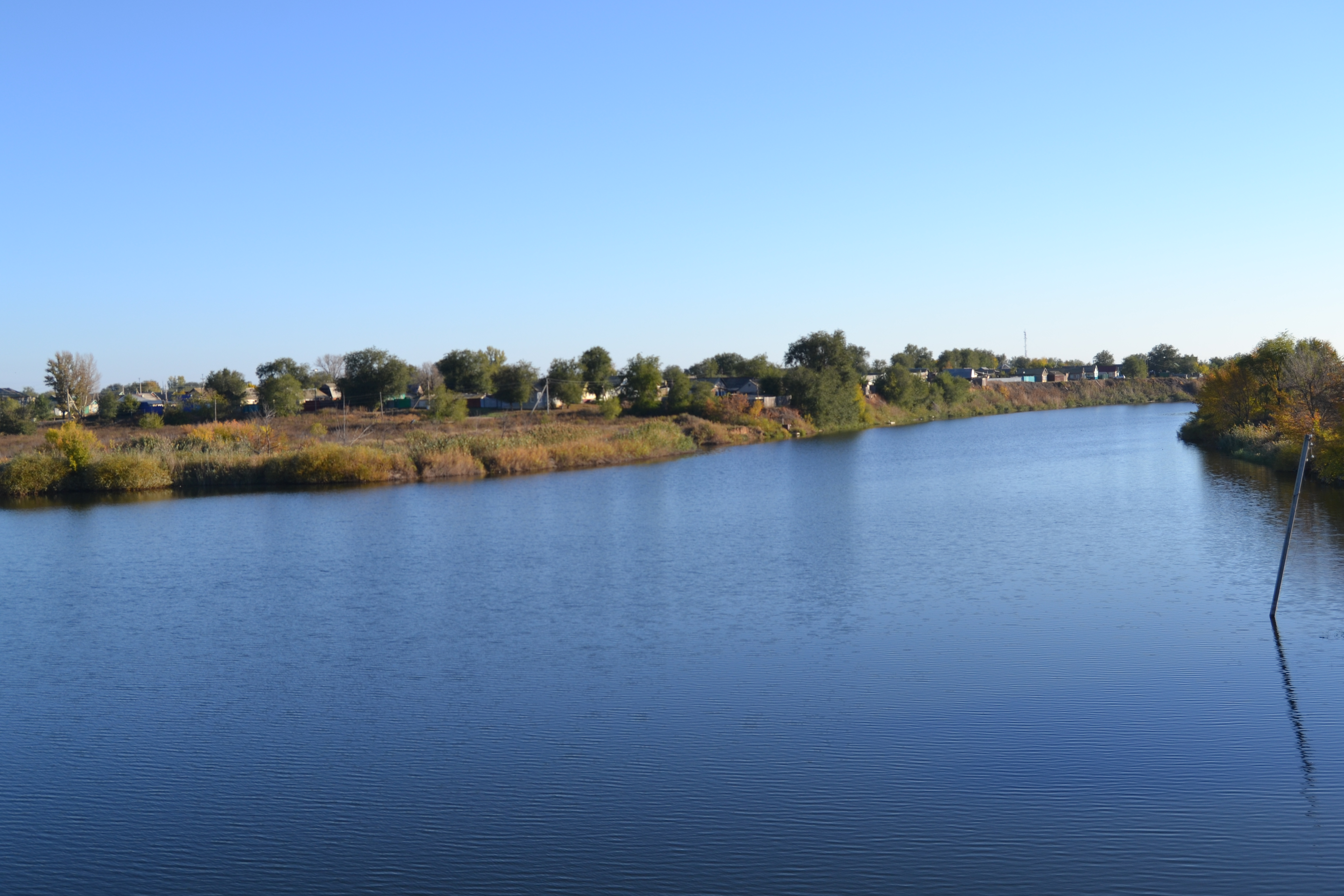
- View of the river near Novouzensk

- Mouth location in Kazakhstan

Location
- Countries: Russia; Kazakhstan

Physical characteristics
- Source: Obshchy Syrt
  - coordinates: 51°39′07″N 48°42′41″E
  - elevation: ca 120 m (390 ft)
- Mouth: Kamys-Samar Lakes
  - coordinates: 48°55′46″N 49°54′46″E
  - elevation: −8 m (−26 ft)
- Length: 650 km (400 mi)
- Basin size: 15,600 km^{2} (6,000 sq mi)
- Discharge
  - average: 7.3 to 393 cubic metres per second (260 to 13,880 cu ft/s) at Novouzensk

The Bolshoy Uzen (Russian: Большой Узень, lit. 'Big Uzen') or Ulken Uzen (Kazakh: Үлкен Өзен, lit. 'Big River' Ülken Özen or Kazakh: Қараөзен, lit. 'Black River') is a river in Saratov Oblast of Russia and West Kazakhstan Province of Kazakhstan. It is 650 kilometres (400 mi) long, with a drainage basin of 15,600 square kilometres (6,000 mi^{2}).

The town of Novouzensk is situated at the Bolshoy Uzen. The river is used for water supply and irrigation.

== Course ==
The Bolshoy Uzen has its sources on the western edge of the Obshchy Syrt highlands of Russia, and flows in a generally southerly direction over the steppes of the Caspian Depression. The Bolshoy Uzen runs parallel to the Maly Uzen, some 50 kilometres (31 mi) further west. Lake Balykty Sarkyl lies between both rivers. The river ends close to Sarykol village in one of the Kamys-Samar Lakes, a group of small lakes and swamps in Western Kazakhstan.

The river's flow peaks in April, since most of its waters come from snowmelt. In the summer some stretches of the Bolshoy Uzen may dry up completely. At Novouzensk the discharge varies from 7.3 to 393 cubic metres per second (260 to 13,880 cu ft/s). The river freezes over in December and stays icebound until the end of March or the beginning of April.
