= Salix caspica =

Scientific classification
- Kingdom: Plantae
- Clade: Tracheophytes
- Clade: Angiosperms
- Clade: Eudicots
- Clade: Rosids
- Order: Malpighiales
- Family: Salicaceae
- Genus: Salix
- Species: S. caspica

Binomial name
- Salix caspica Pall.

Synonyms
- Salix volgensis Andersson

Plant in the genus of willows

Salix caspica is a plant from the willow genus (Salix) within the willow family (Salicaceae). The natural range extends from eastern European Russia to far western China.

== Taxonomy ==
Salix caspica is a species from the section Helix in the genus of willows (Salix) within the willow family (Salicaceae). It was first published in 1788 by Peter Simon Pallas. The specific epithet 'caspica' refers to the distribution area along the Caspian Sea.

The holotype was collected in the Ryn Desert and is housed in the Komarov Botanical Institute in St. Petersburg.

It forms the natural hybrid S. × turgaiskensis E.L.Wolf with S. rosmarinifolia in Kazakhstan. It also hybridises with S. siberica, S. tenuijulis and S. viminalis sensu lato.

=== Infraspecific variation ===
- Salix caspica f. longifolia was described by Nils Johan Andersson in the Prodromus, it has leaves up to 12 cm in length and 0.4 to 0.6 cm broad.
- Salix caspica f. pruinosa is another form described by Andersson. It is very rare. It has dark purple branches covered in a thick pruinose (waxy) bloom.

== Description ==
=== Vegetative characteristics ===
Salix caspica is a large shrub with a height of up to 5 meters. The bark is gray. The bark of the relatively thin branches is yellowish and shiny. The buds are about 5 millimeters long and pointed.

The alternate leaves arranged on the branches are divided into a petiole and a leaf blade. The petiole is 3 to 5 millimeters long and glabrous. With a length of 5 to 8 centimeters and a width of 4 to 5 centimeters, the simple leaf blade is linear-lanceolate or linear with a wedge-shaped base, long, pointed and entire. Both sides of the leaf are the same color, initially slightly tomentose and later glabrous. The caducous stipules are linear.

The number of chromosomes is 2n=38.

=== Generative characteristics ===
The inflorescences are long, cylindrical, almost subsessile, terete, densely flowered catkins with deciduous, scale-like leaflets at the base. The inflorescence rachis is tomentose-hairy. The bracts are brownish, pilose-hairy with a blunt tip. Male flowers have two stamens, with their filaments fused to each other and downy-haired at the base, and with yellow anthers. Female flowers have an ovoid-conical, densely tomentose, subsessile ovary. The style is very short, the stigma is capitulate. The fruit is a brownish, pubescent capsule.

== Distribution ==
The natural range extends from the eastern European Russia in the northern Caucausus, Southern Federal District, Volga Federal District and the Ural Federal District, eastwards to Kazakhstan, Turkmenistan, and Iran, extending to Dauria, Mongolia and the western part of the Chinese province of Xinjiang.

== Ecology ==
It grows in open forests along rivers in China, elsewhere it grows along rivers in deserts and steppes in loose sandy soil or sand dunes with a high water table, and in mountain valleys up to 2,000 metres in altitude. It is also typically found in blow outs. It requires much light to grow.

Salix caspica blooms before the leaves appear, in Xinjiang from April to May. The fruits ripen in Xinjiang in June. In Russia it also flowers in May and fruits in June.

== Uses ==
Salix caspica is planted to stabilize slopes and sandy soils. Baskets and other wicker articles are woven from the branches. It is considered an excellent species for this purpose, growing straight, thin, pliable stems to 2m or longer in a season. It was also grown as an ornamental plant in the Soviet Union.
