= Zhanybek District =

Coordinates: 49°27′00″N 46°53′24″E

Zhanybek Жәнібек
- District
- Жәнібек ауданы
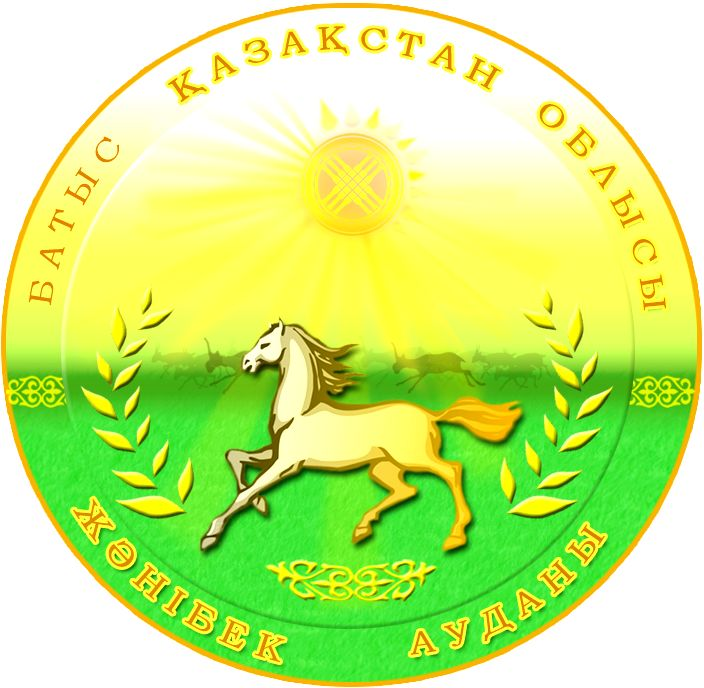
- Seal

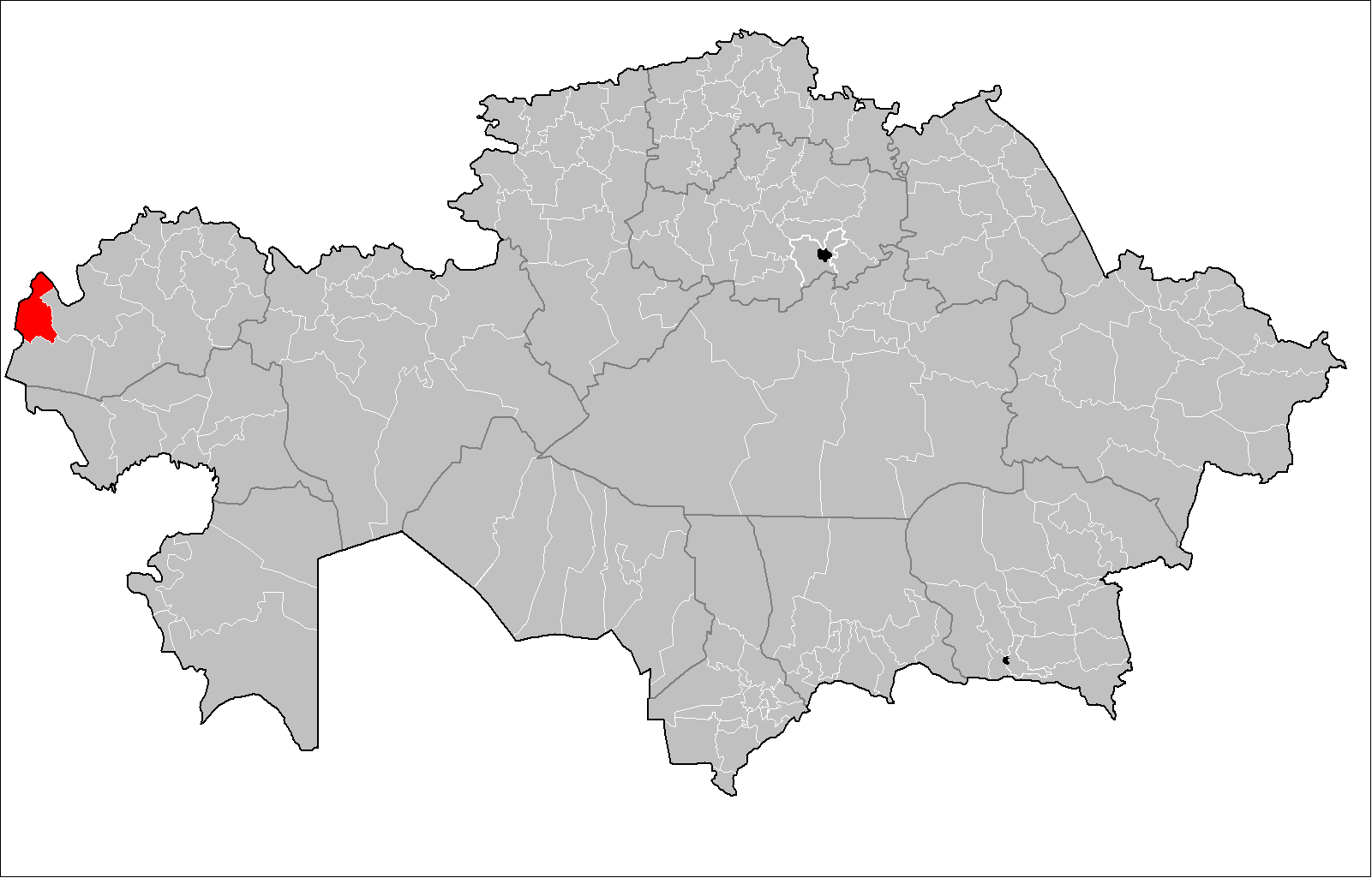
- Location of Zhanybek District in Kazakhstan
- Country: Kazakhstan
- Region: West Kazakhstan Region
- Administrative center: Zhanybek

Government
  - Akim: Timur Shiniyazov

Population (2013)
  - Total: 16,639
- Time zone: UTC+5 (West)

Zhanybek (Kazakh: Жәнібек ауданы, Jänıbek audany) is a district of West Kazakhstan Region in western Kazakhstan. The administrative center of the district is the selo of Zhanybek. Population: 16,639 (2013 estimate); 16,896 (2009 census results); 19,511 (1999 census results).

== Geography ==
The district is located in the northern part of the Caspian Depression. The Ashchyozek river flows across it.
