= Botkul =

Lake in Kazakhstan and Russia

- Боткуль / Боткөл
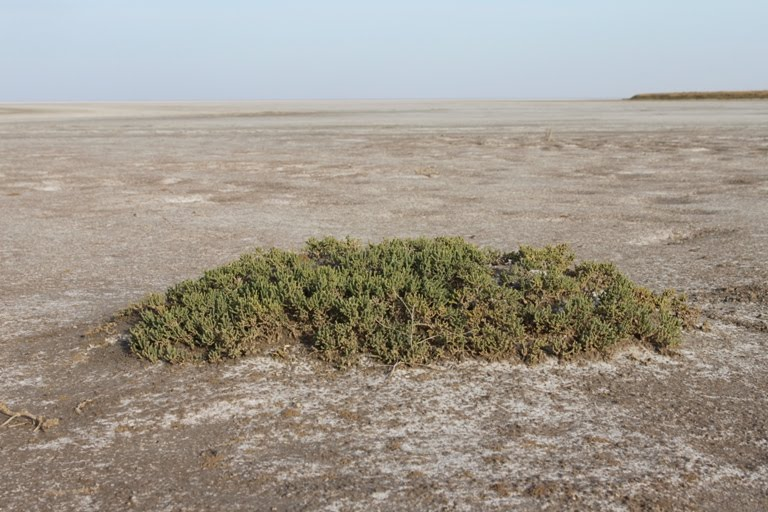
- Panorama of the lake

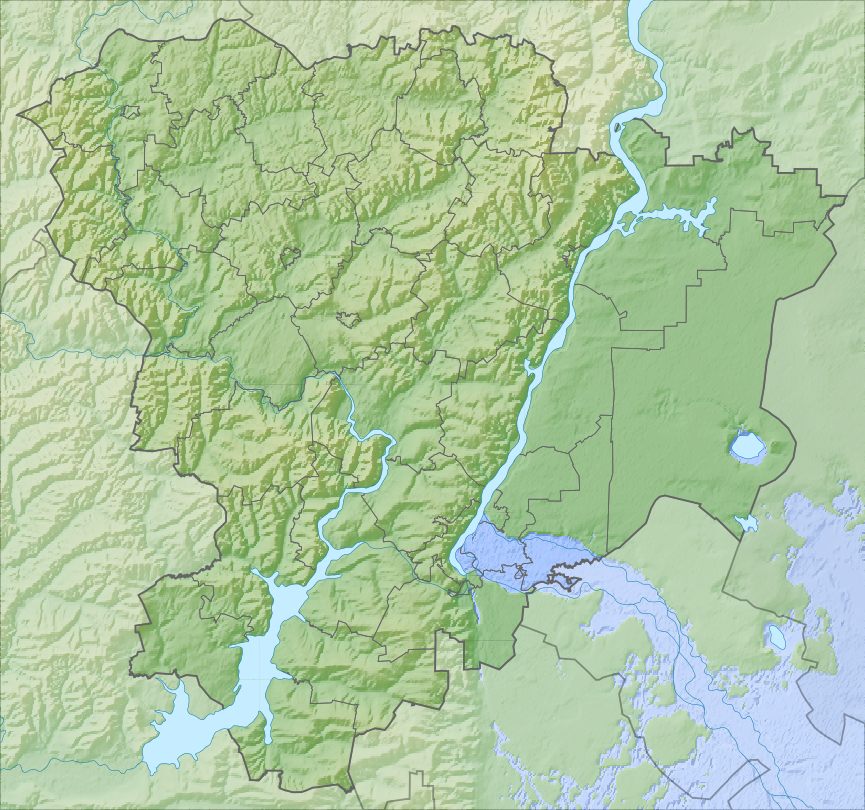
- Location within Volgograd Oblast Location within Kazakhstan

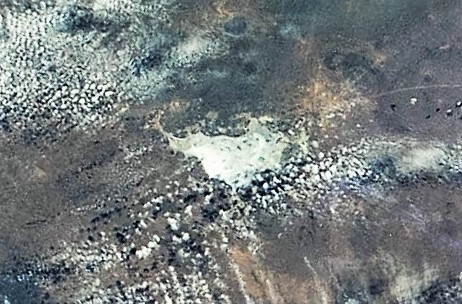
- ISS picture of the lake in 2019
- Location: Caspian Lowland
- Coordinates: 48°46′N 46°40′E
- Type: endorheic
- Primary inflows: Solyonaya
- Catchment area: 497 square kilometers (192 sq mi)
- Basin countries: Russia; Kazakhstan
- Max. length: 9.6 kilometers (6.0 mi)
- Max. width: 6.6 kilometers (4.1 mi)
- Surface area: 32 square kilometers (12 sq mi) to 65.9 square kilometers (25.4 sq mi)
- Surface elevation: 2 meters (6 ft 7 in)

Botkul (Kazakh: Боткөл; Russian: Боткуль) is a bittern salt lake in the Kazakhstan–Russia border.

There is no salt mining at the lake. Its waters have a bitter, stinging taste and a strong smell of hydrogen sulfide. The authorities are exploring the potential of developing Botkul as a tourist attraction.

== Geography ==
Botkul is an endorheic lake located east of the course of the Volga in the Caspian Lowland, about 40 kilometers (25 mi) to the south of lake Elton. The main river feeding its waters is the Solyonaya, a small stream flowing from the west. The lake is shallow and in years of drought it dries completely up.

Botkul is surrounded by salt marshes. The Kazakhstan–Russia border runs across the middle of the lake from NNE to SSW. The western part of the lake lies in Pallasovsky District, Volgograd Oblast, Russian Federation and the eastern in Bokey Orda District, West Kazakhstan Region, Kazakhstan. Saykyn, located to the northeast, is the nearest village.

== See also ==
- List of lakes of Kazakhstan
- List of lakes of Russia
