= Cercidia levii =

Scientific classification
- Kingdom: Animalia
- Phylum: Arthropoda
- Subphylum: Chelicerata
- Class: Arachnida
- Order: Araneae
- Infraorder: Araneomorphae
- Family: Araneidae
- Genus: Cercidia
- Species: C. levii

Binomial name
- Cercidia levii Marusik, 1985

Species of spider

Cercidia levii is a species of spider in the orb-weaver family Araneidae, found in European Russia and Kazakhstan.

== Taxonomy ==
Cercidia levii was first described by Yuri M. Marusik in 1985.

== Description ==
The female has a body length of about 4.0 mm (0.16 in), made up of a cephalothorax of 1.7 mm (0.07 in) and an abdomen of 2.3 mm (0.09 in). The carapace is brown with three white stripes, the middle one being wider than the two side ones. The sternum is gray-brown, darker than the carapace, with a lighter spot in the centre. The upper surface of the abdomen is reddish brown. Two gray-brown stripes run along the length of the abdomen. The anterior third of the abdomen is occupied by a light brown scutum with spines on the top and the sides. The legs are whitish with distinct gray-brown rings. The male is smaller, with a body length of about 3.6 mm (0.14 in). The carapace is darker than the female's and the stripes are narrower. The scutum occupies about two thirds of the abdomen.

The spiders become sexually mature by the end of August.

== Distribution and habitat ==
Cercidia levii is native to European Russia and Kazakhstan. It is found in semi-desert areas. Among orb-weaving spiders in Zhanybek (Dzhanybek), Kazakhstan, C. levii is the second most numerous species after Neoscona adianta.
