= Khadisha Bukeyeva =

- Хадиша Бөкеева
- Born: February 21, 1917; Kaztal, Ural Oblast, Russian Empire (present-day Kazakhstan)
- Died: January 31, 2011 (aged 93); Almaty, Kazakhstan
- Occupation: Actress

Khadisha Bukeyevna Bukeyeva (Note: Kazakh: Хадиша Бөкеева, romanized: Khadisha Bökeeva; Russian: Хадиша Букеевна Букеева, romanized: Khadisha Bukeyevna Bukeyeva) (21 February 1917 – January 31, 2011) was a Soviet, Kazakh theater and film actress, master of fine arts. People's Artist of the USSR (1964).

== Biography ==
Khadisha Bukeyeva was born on February 21 (January 1 according to other sources) 1917 in the village of Kaztal, Ural Oblast, Russian Empire (present-day Kazakhstan) (according to other sources in Kaztalovsky district).

She lost her parents at an early age and was brought up in an orphanage in the village of Shieli in South Kazakhstan Region. In 1932, she was brought to Almaty and arranged to study in a preparatory group of the Medical Institute. It was very difficult to study, the necessary knowledge the girl did not have. She had to study intermittently, so she never managed to finish school.

Passion for singing and dancing does not pass without a trace. She took part in amateur performances. In 1934 she was selected by the commission and sent to study at the Technical School of Stage Art in Leningrad (since 1936 - the Central Stage School, now the Russian State Institute of Performing Arts), from which she graduated in 1938. Her mentors were prominent masters of stage Leonid Vivien, Vsevolod Meyerhold, Vasili Merkuryev.

In 1938, all the graduates of the school were sent to Shymkent. They were the core of the then organized South Kazakhstan Regional Drama Theater.

Since 1942 she was an actress in the Kazakh State Drama Auezov Theater in Almaty, where she was on stage till the end of her life.

One of the facets of her talent was the skill of artistic reading.

Since 1965 conducted pedagogical activity at the theatrical faculty (since 1977 - the Theatrical and Art Institute, nowadays the Kazakh National Academy of Arts) at the Kazakh National Conservatory (1968 - the Kazakh National Academy of Arts). She was the student of the Kazakh National Academy of Arts named after Kurmangazy (since 1968 she was the senior lecturer, since 1974 she was the professor). Among her students are well-known Kazakh actors Asirali Kenjeuly, Kuman Tastanbekov, Dosqan Joljaqsynov, Tungysbai Jamanqulov, Meryert Otekeseva, and Gulnara Mashurova.

Member of the Union of Cinematographers of the Kazakh SSR

She died on January 31, 2011, in Almaty. Buried in the Kensai Cemetery.

== Awards and titles ==
- People's Artist of the Kazakh SSR (1957)
- People's Artist of the USSR (1964)
- Stalin Prize of the third degree (1952) for her performance as Aigerim in Abai by Mukhtar Auezov
- Order of Lenin (1959)
- Order of Friendship of Peoples (1987)
- Order of the Badge of Honour (1946)
- Order of Otan (2000)
- Medal "Veteran of Labour"
- Jubilee Medal "Forty Years of Victory in the Great Patriotic War 1941–1945"

== Creative ==
=== Roles in theater ===
==== Chimkent Regional Kazakh Drama Theater named after Zh. Shanin ====
- Intrigue and Love by Friedrich Schiller — Louise
- Late Love by Alexander Ostrovsky — Lyudmila
- Enlik-Kebek by Mukhtar Auezov — Enlik
- Akhan Sera - Aktokt by Gabit Musirepov — Aktokty
- The Eve by Alexander Afinogenov — Zhamal (staged at the Mossovet Theatre, which was evacuated to Chimkent during the war)

==== Auezov Theater ====
- Friendship and Love by Aljappar Abishev — Saule
- Kara Kipchak Koblandy by Mukhtar Auezov — Karlyga
- Abai by Mukhtar Auezov — Aigerim
- Legend of Love (Farhad and Shirin) by Nâzım Hikmet — Mekhmene Banu
- The Taming of the Shrew by William Shakespeare — Katharina
- Richard III (play) by William Shakespeare — Queen Margaret
- Othello by William Shakespeare — Emilia, Desdemona
- Saule by Tahayi Ahtanov — Saule
- The Star of Vietnam by I. Kupriyanov — Thanh
- Amangeldy by Gabit Musirepov — Banu
- Kozy Korpesh - Bayan Sulu by Gabit Musirepov — Dametken
- Chokan Valikhanov by Sabit Mukanov — Panayeva
- The Storm by Alexander Ostrovsky — Katerina
- Love at Dawn by Yaroslav Halan — Varvara

=== Filmography ===
- 1940 — Raihan — Raihan
- 1956 — The Birches in the Stepp — Dina
- 1957 — Our Dear Doctor — Cameo
- 1958 — Squall — Rabiga
- 1959 — On a Wild Shore — Muratova
- 1964 — Tracks Go Beyond the Horizon — Mother

== Interesting Facts ==
"Born to be beautiful." "The date of her birth in her passport is January 1, 1917. But those who knew Khadisha Bukeyeva intimately claim that she did not live to her 100th birthday for only a year. And January 1 is a symbolic date in her documents. It's no secret that many of that generation, whose childhood and youth fell on the hungry 20s, the true day and even year of birth was unknown. The actress herself celebrated her birthday on February 21 - in honor of the beginning of her married life in her long and happy marriage to the opera singer Baigali Dosymzhanov." Galiya SHIMYRBAEVA, Kazakhstan truth, February 2, 2011.

== Memory ==
A museum was opened in the homeland of the actress, and the main street bears her name Since 2014, the name of the actress has been given to the Urals Kazakh Drama Theatre.. In Almaty, a memorial plaque has been installed on the wall of house #96 on Zenkova Street, where the actress lived for more than 25 years.
