= Ashchyozek =

River in Kazakhstan

Ashchyozek Ащыөзек
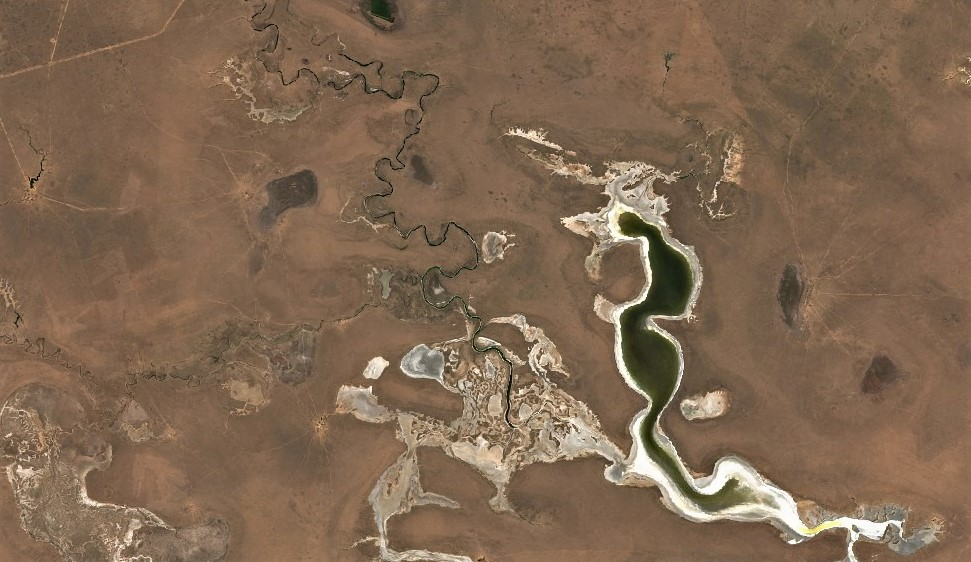
- Last stretch of the Ashchyozek Sentinel-2 image

- Mouth location in Kazakhstan

Physical characteristics
- Source
  - location: near Borsy
  - coordinates: 49°57′29″N 47°32′29″E
  - elevation: 37 m (121 ft)
- Mouth: Zhalpaksor
  - coordinates: 49°10′45″N 48°08′38″E
  - elevation: −4 m (−13 ft)
- Length: 258 km (160 mi)
- Basin size: 7,150 km^{2} (2,760 sq mi)
- Discharge
  - average: 2.04 m^{3}/s (72 cu ft/s)

The Ashchyozek (Kazakh: Ащыөзек, meaning "bitter river"; (Russian: Ащыозек), also known as "Gorkaya" (Горькая) in Russian, is a river in the Zhanybek and Kaztal districts of West Kazakhstan Region, Kazakhstan. The river is 258 km (160 mi) long with a basin area of 7,150 km^{2} (2,760 sq mi).

The river flows in the northern sector of the Caspian Depression, between the Volga and the Ural. The water is used for irrigation and watering livestock. There is a protected area in the lower reaches of the river.

== Geography ==
The Ashchyozek has its origin in a source to the southeast of Borsy village in Zhanibek District, very close to the Kazakhstan–Russia border. The river heads roughly southeastwards all along its course, meandering strongly in its last stretch. Finally it ends in lake Zhalpaksor, close to Aralsor. The valley is not well defined. The river is fed by snow and its waters are fresh in the spring, becoming salty and bitter in the summer, when it breaks up into disconnected pools.

River Ashchyozek has seven tributaries with a total length of 169 km (105 mi); the main ones are the 91 km (57 mi) long Sherimbetsai, Tatkensai and Bersharal, all from the right. The Ashchyozek freezes in November and thaws in April.

== See also ==
- List of rivers of Kazakhstan
