= Kamys-Samar Lakes =

Lake in Kazakhstan

- Қамыс-Самар көлдері
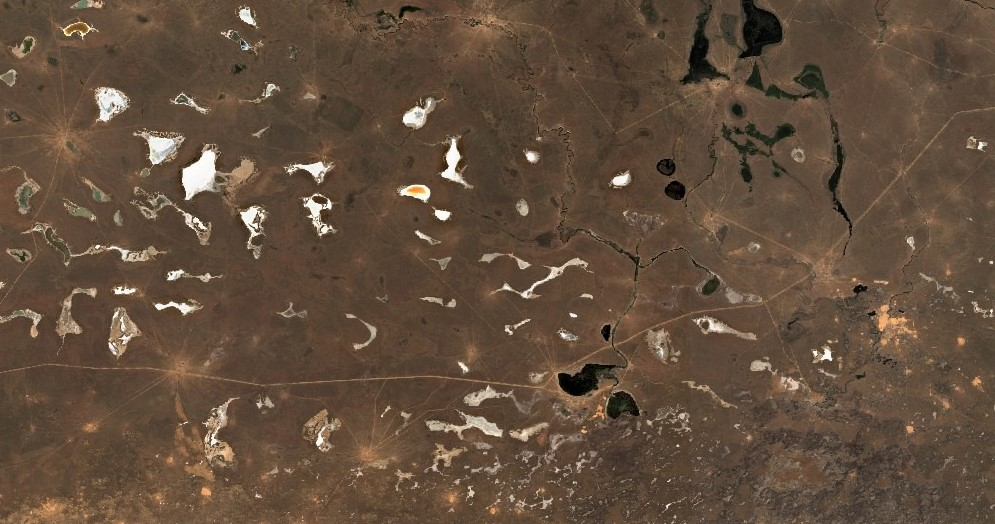
- Sentinel-2 image of the lake cluster

- Location within Kazakhstan
- Location: Caspian Depression
- Coordinates: 48°56′N 49°39′E
- Type: Endorheic lakes
- Primary inflows: Bolshoy Uzen and Maly Uzen
- Primary outflows: none
- Basin countries: Kazakhstan
- Surface elevation: 6 meters (20 ft)

Kamys-Samar Lakes (Kazakh: Қамыс-Самар көлдері; Russian: Камыш-Самарские озёра) is a lake group in Zhanakala District, West Kazakhstan Region, Kazakhstan.

There used to be fisheries in some of the lakes in the past, at the time of the Kazakh SSR, but in present times they are mostly dry or have become intermittent lakes.

== Geography ==
The Kamys-Samar lakes are located in the northern Caspian Depression, north of the Ryn Desert, a largely flat arid region dominated by salt marshes and salt flats. The lake area stretches from east to west for over 100 kilometers (62 mi) and from north to south for about 60 kilometers (37 mi). The water of the rivers on the area has been largely diverted for agricultural use. Still, in years of sufficient rain the Bolshoy Uzen and Maly Uzen rivers flow into the lake area.

Some of the largest lakes are Saryaydyn, Kanbakty and Aydyn. The Aralsor lake cluster is located to the west. To the northeast lie the lakes at the mouth of the Kushum.

== See also ==
- List of lakes of Kazakhstan
- Sor (geomorphology)
