= Zhanybek =

Zhanybek: Жәнібек (Kazakh); Жанибек (Russian)
- Town
- Location within Kazakhstan
- Coordinates: 49°25′N 46°51′E
- Country: Kazakhstan
- Region: West Kazakhstan Region
- District: Zhanybek District

Population (2009)
  - Total: 7,460
- Time zone: UTC+5 (UTC + 5)

Zhanybek (Kazakh: Жәнібек, Jänıbek; Russian: Жанибек) is a town in far north-western Kazakhstan on the border with Volgograd Oblast, Russia. It is the administrative center of Zhanybek District in West Kazakhstan Region. Population: 7,460 (2009 census results); 7,580 (1999 census results). It is served by Dzhanybek railway station of the Volga Railway on the Krasny Kut — Astrakhan line between Kaisatskaya and Elton stations.

Zhanybek is the westernmost settlement connected by a road network in Kazakhstan.

== Geography ==
The settlement is located 440 km (270 miles) west of the city of Oral in a semi-desert belt with mixed deserts.

=== Climate ===
Zhanybek has a cold semi-arid climate (Köppen: BSk), characterized by very cold winters and hot summers.

Climate data for Zhanybek (1991–2020)
Month	Jan	Feb	Mar	Apr	May	Jun	Jul	Aug	Sep	Oct	Nov	Dec	Year
Mean daily maximum °C (°F)	−4.1 (24.6)	−3.3 (26.1)	4.5 (40.1)	16.4 (61.5)	24.4 (75.9)	29.6 (85.3)	32.2 (90.0)	30.9 (87.6)	23.4 (74.1)	14.2 (57.6)	4.0 (39.2)	−2.3 (27.9)	14.2 (57.6)
Daily mean °C (°F)	−7.5 (18.5)	−7.4 (18.7)	−0.4 (31.3)	9.6 (49.3)	17.2 (63.0)	22.4 (72.3)	24.9 (76.8)	23.4 (74.1)	16.2 (61.2)	8.3 (46.9)	−0.1 (31.8)	−5.6 (21.9)	8.4 (47.1)
Mean daily minimum °C (°F)	−10.7 (12.7)	−10.9 (12.4)	−4.2 (24.4)	3.8 (38.8)	10.4 (50.7)	15.3 (59.5)	17.7 (63.9)	16.0 (60.8)	9.6 (49.3)	3.4 (38.1)	−3.2 (26.2)	−8.6 (16.5)	3.2 (37.8)
Average precipitation mm (inches)	25.2 (0.99)	19.0 (0.75)	22.8 (0.90)	24.0 (0.94)	30.9 (1.22)	32.6 (1.28)	23.9 (0.94)	19.0 (0.75)	26.8 (1.06)	27.4 (1.08)	19.6 (0.77)	25.2 (0.99)	296.4 (11.67)
Average precipitation days (≥ 1.0 mm)	6.9	4.9	5.2	4.8	5.1	5.1	4.2	2.9	4.6	5.4	5.0	6.3	60.4
Source: NOAA
