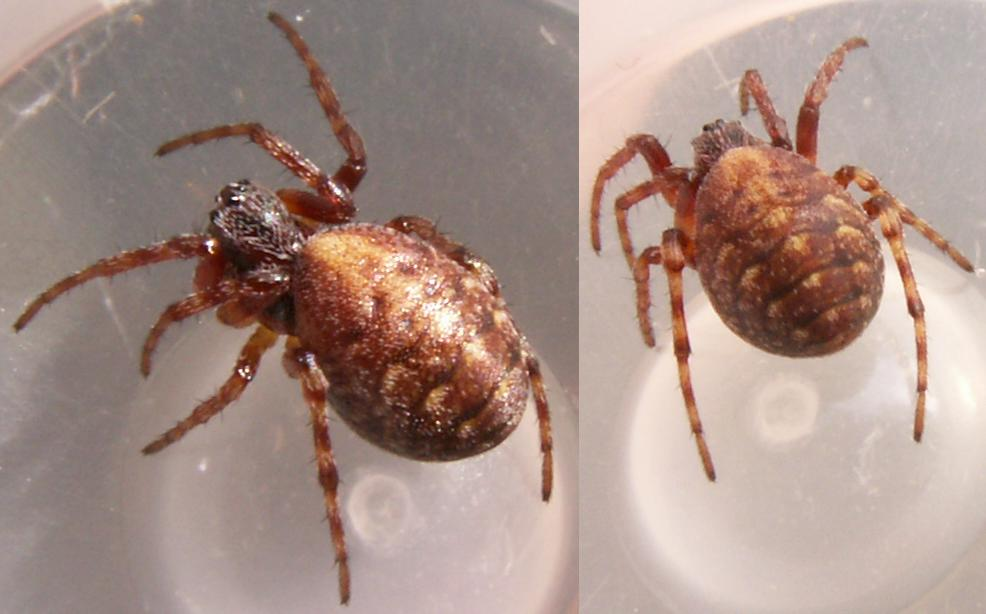
- Cercidia prominens

Scientific classification
- Kingdom: Animalia
- Phylum: Arthropoda
- Subphylum: Chelicerata
- Class: Arachnida
- Order: Araneae
- Infraorder: Araneomorphae
- Family: Araneidae
- Genus: Cercidia; Thorell, 1869

Type species
- C. prominens (Westring, 1851)

Species
- C. levii Marusik, 1985 – Russia (Europe), Kazakhstan; C. prominens (Westring, 1851) – North America, Europe, Caucasus, Russia (Europe to Far East), Kazakhstan; C. punctigera Simon, 1889 – India

= Cercidia =

Genus of spiders

Cercidia is a genus of orb-weaver spiders (family Araneidae). As of November 2026, it contained only three species.

== Description ==
The genus Cercidia can be distinguished from other Palearctic araneid genera by the possession of a scutum bearing spines and having a clypeus about 2.5 times the size of the median eyes. In related species, the clypeus is less than or equal to the diameter of the anterior median eyes.

== Taxonomy ==
The genus was first erected in 1866 by Anton Menge using the name Cerceis. However, this genus name had already been used in 1840 for a genus of crustaceans, so was not available. The replacement name Cercidia was published by Tamerlan Thorell in 1869. The name is derived from the Greek κερκίς 'shuttle'.

In 1975, Herbert Walter Levi considered that Cercidia contained only one certain species, C. prominens. He doubted that C. punctigera belonged to the genus. The third species accepted by the World Spider Catalog as of November 2026, C. levii, was not described until 1985.
