= Shagan (Ural) =

Shagan Шаған
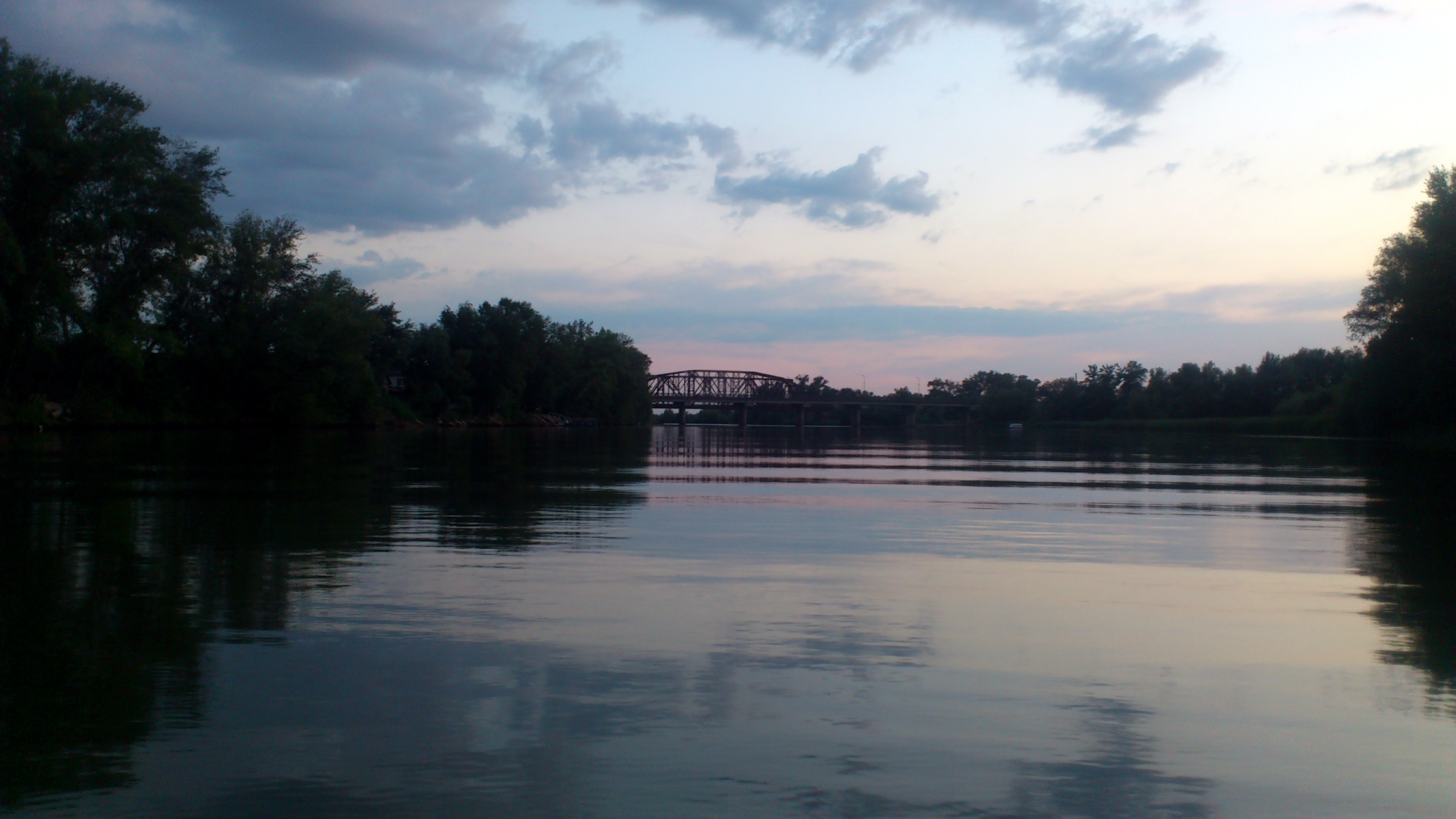

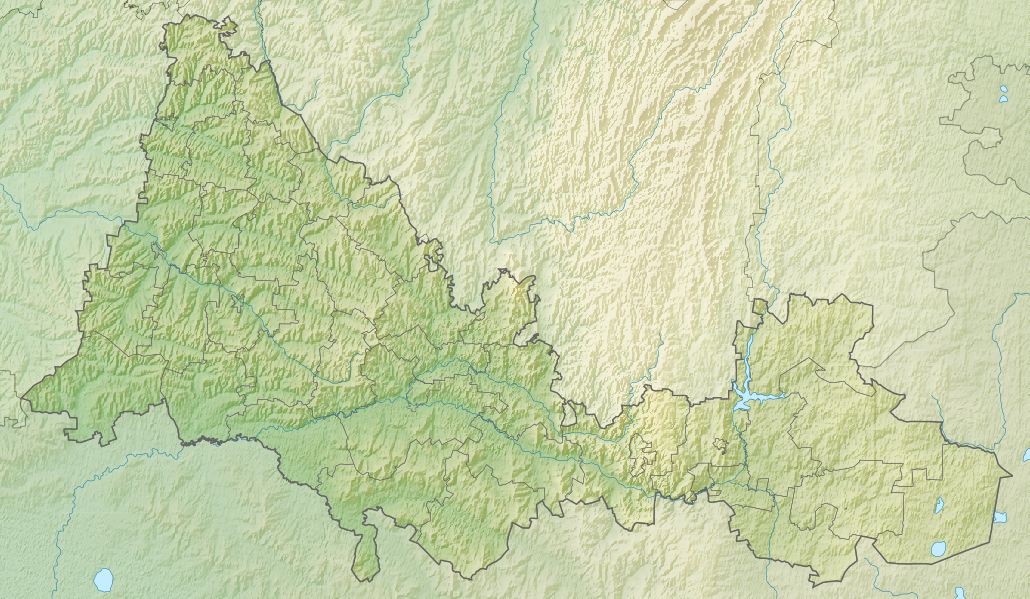
- Mouth location Shagan (Ural) (Orenburg Oblast)

Physical characteristics
- Source
  - location: Obshchy Syrt
- Mouth: Ural
  - location: near Oral
  - coordinates: 51°10′33″N 51°20′58″E
- Length: 264 km (164 mi)
- Basin size: 7,530 km^{2} (2,910 sq mi)

Basin features
- Progression: Ural→ Caspian Sea

The Shagan (Kazakh: Шаған, romanized: Şağan [ʃɑˈʁɑn]; Russian: Шаган, IPA: [ʂɐˈgan]) is a river in the West Kazakhstan Region, Kazakhstan, and in Orenburg Oblast, Russia.

It is a tributary of the Ural. The river is 264 kilometres (164 mi) long, and has a drainage basin of 7,530 square kilometres (2,910 sq mi).

Its name may be derived either from the Tatar word for 'maple', or from the Kalmyk word for 'white'. Among the Kazakhs, the river is also known as Aksu ('White Water').

== See also ==
- List of rivers of Kazakhstan
