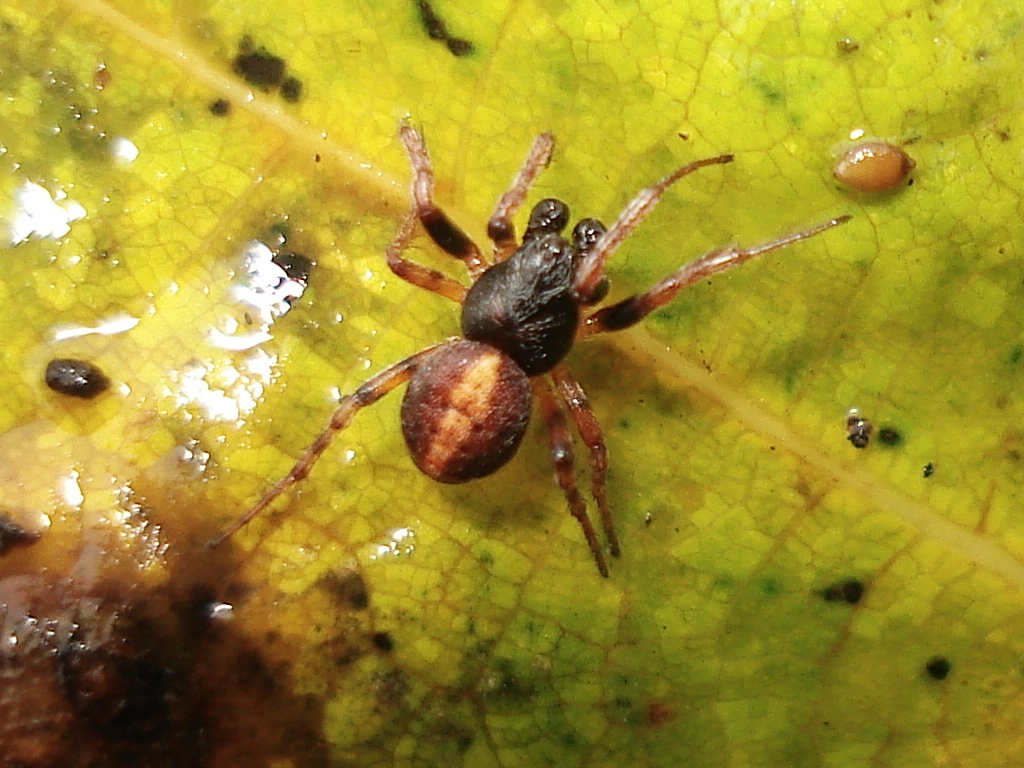
- Male

Scientific classification
- Kingdom: Animalia
- Phylum: Arthropoda
- Subphylum: Chelicerata
- Class: Arachnida
- Order: Araneae
- Infraorder: Araneomorphae
- Family: Araneidae
- Genus: Cercidia
- Species: C. prominens

Binomial name
- Cercidia prominens (Westring, 1851)

Synonyms
- List: Araneus prominens (Westring, 1851); Atea spinosa Ohlert, 1865; Cerceis prominens (Westring, 1851); Epeira bella Meade, 1861; Epeira ochracea Grube, 1861; Epeira prominens Westring, 1851; Miranda carinata Giebel, 1869; Singa prominens (Westring, 1851); Singa scutifera Westring, 1861

= Cercidia prominens =

Species of spider

Cercidia prominens is a species of orb-weaver spiders in the spider family Araneidae. It is found in North America, Europe, the Caucasus, and a range from Russia to Kazakhstan.

== Taxonomy ==
The species was first described by Niklas Westring in 1851 as Epeira prominens. In 1866, Anton Menge made it the type species of his new genus Cerceis. However, this genus name had already been used in 1840 for a genus of crustaceans, so was not available. The replacement name Cercidia was published by Tamerlan Thorell in 1869, and this species became Cercidia prominens.

== Description ==
Females vary in total body length from 3.8 mm (0.15 in) to at least 5.4 mm (0.21 in). Males are slightly smaller, with recorded total lengths of between 3.6 mm (0.14 in) and 4.1 mm (0.16 in). Living specimens of Cercidia prominens have a brighter orange-red coloration, which fades to orange-brown when preserved in alcohol. The original describer, Niklas Westring, used the term tegelröd, 'brick red', for the colour of the thorax. Females have an orange carapace with a dark spot on the thorax, and a similarly coloured abdomen with a lighter central band and four dark spots at the front end of the scutum. The legs are also orange. The sternum is brown. Males are similarly coloured, but hardened (sclerotized) parts are darker.

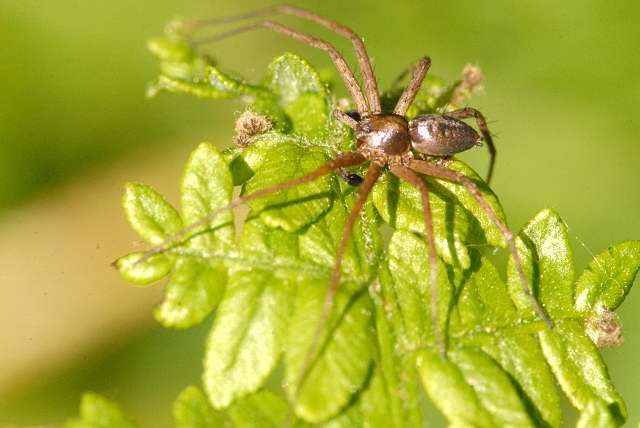
