= Summit accordance =

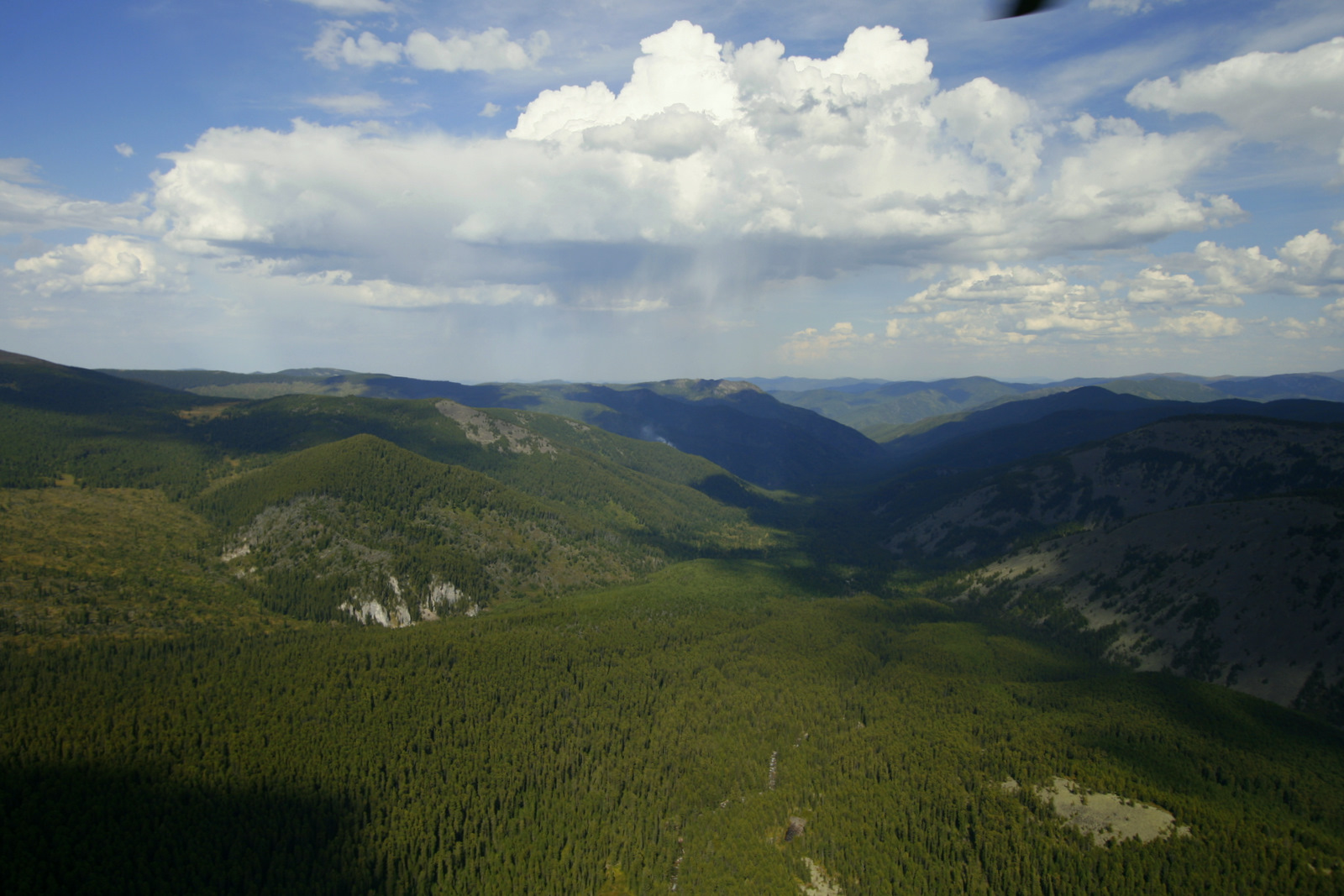
The highest of hills in this picture show fairly similar heights making up a summit accordance. Aerial photograph from the Altai region of Russia.

A summit accordance (sometimes also known by the German loan word gipfelflur) exists when hills and mountaintops, and eventually also plateaux, have such a disposition that they form a geometric plane that may be either horizontal or tilted. Summit accordances can be the vestiges of former continuous erosion surfaces that were uplifted and eroded. Other proposed explanations include:

- the possibility that erosion becomes more effective at height, tearing down mountains that stand out
- that isostasy regulates the height of individual mountain masses meaning that small mountains might be uplifted and large mountains dragged down
- that landscape dissection by uniformly spaced streams eventually reach a state in which summits attain similar heights
- that summit accordance is derivative of structural planes exposed by erosion

== See also ==
- Dissected plateau
- Glacial buzzsaw
- Syrt
