= Saryaydyn =

- Сарыайдын
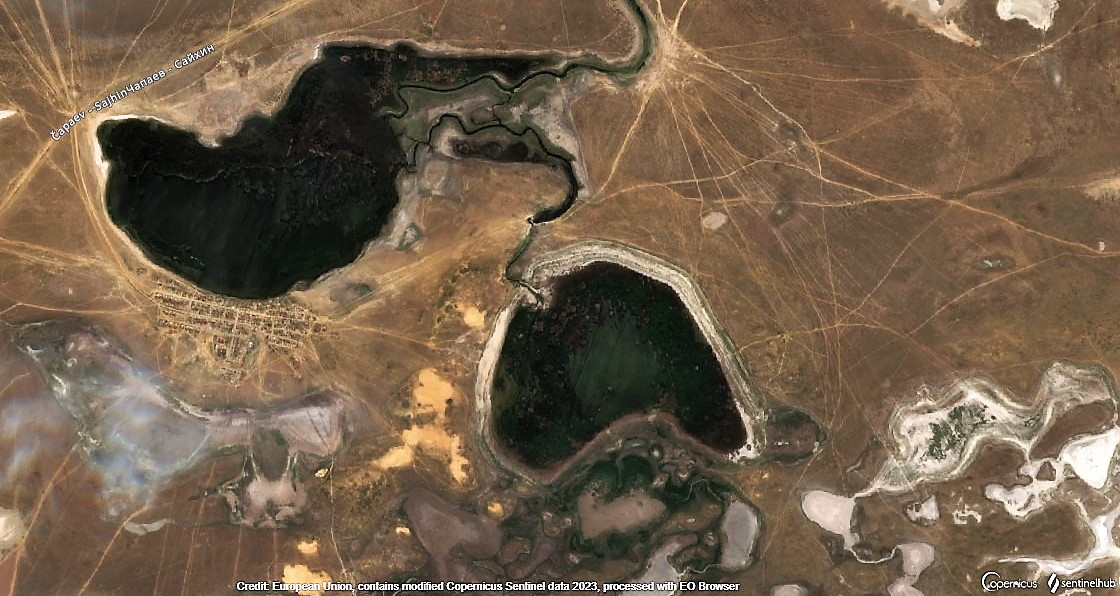
- Saryaydyn (lower left) and neighboring Aydyn lake Sentinel-2 image.

- Location within Kazakhstan
- Location: Kamys-Samar Lakes
- Coordinates: 48°55′44″N 49°40′45″E
- Type: salt lake
- Primary inflows: Maly Uzen
- Basin countries: Kazakhstan
- Max. length: 3.3 kilometers (2.1 mi)
- Max. width: 2.5 kilometers (1.6 mi)
- Surface area: ca 6 square kilometers (2.3 sq mi)
- Shore length^{1}: 20 kilometers (12 mi)
- Surface elevation: −6 meters (−20 ft)
- Settlements: Zhanakazan
- ^{1} Shore length is not a well-defined measure.

Saryaydyn (Kazakh: Сарыайдын) is a salt lake in Zhanakala District, West Kazakhstan Region, Kazakhstan.

The lake lies at the end of the course of the Maly Uzen, close to Zhanakazan (former Novaya Kazanka), and 54 kilometers (34 mi) southwest of Zhanakala, the capital of the district.

== Geography ==
Saryaydyn belongs to the large Kamys-Samar lake group. It is located in the southern part and has a length of 3.3 kilometers (2.1 mi) and a width of 2.5 kilometers (1.6 mi). The lake basin is fed by snow, as well as groundwater. In the summer the lake may dry up.

River Maly Uzen flows into Saryaydyn from the north but its water is heavily depleted by agricultural use. To the northwest lies lake Aydyn, to the north of Zhanakazan.

== See also ==
- List of lakes of Kazakhstan
