= Syrt =

A syrt is a kind of an elevated landform in Russia and Central Asia.

The word means "highland", "ridge" or "backbone" in Turkic languages (sırt) and is present in Turkic toponymy in the mentioned areas: in Tien Shan, Pamirs, South Urals, such as Obshchiy Syrt by Urals, Uzun-Syrt ("Long back") plateau by Koktebel in Crimea.

It is a denudational upland or elevated flatland, a kind of dissected plateau. Syrts may be separated from each other by higher ridges. At the same time, syrts may serve as water divides between drainage basins for larger rivers.

The term should not be confused with the Latin term syrtis and the derived term "syrt" for sandy shores or quicksand.

== See also ==
- Summit accordance
