= Kaztalov District =

Coordinates: 49.7651°N 48.685°E

Kaztalov Қазталов
- District
- Қазталов ауданы
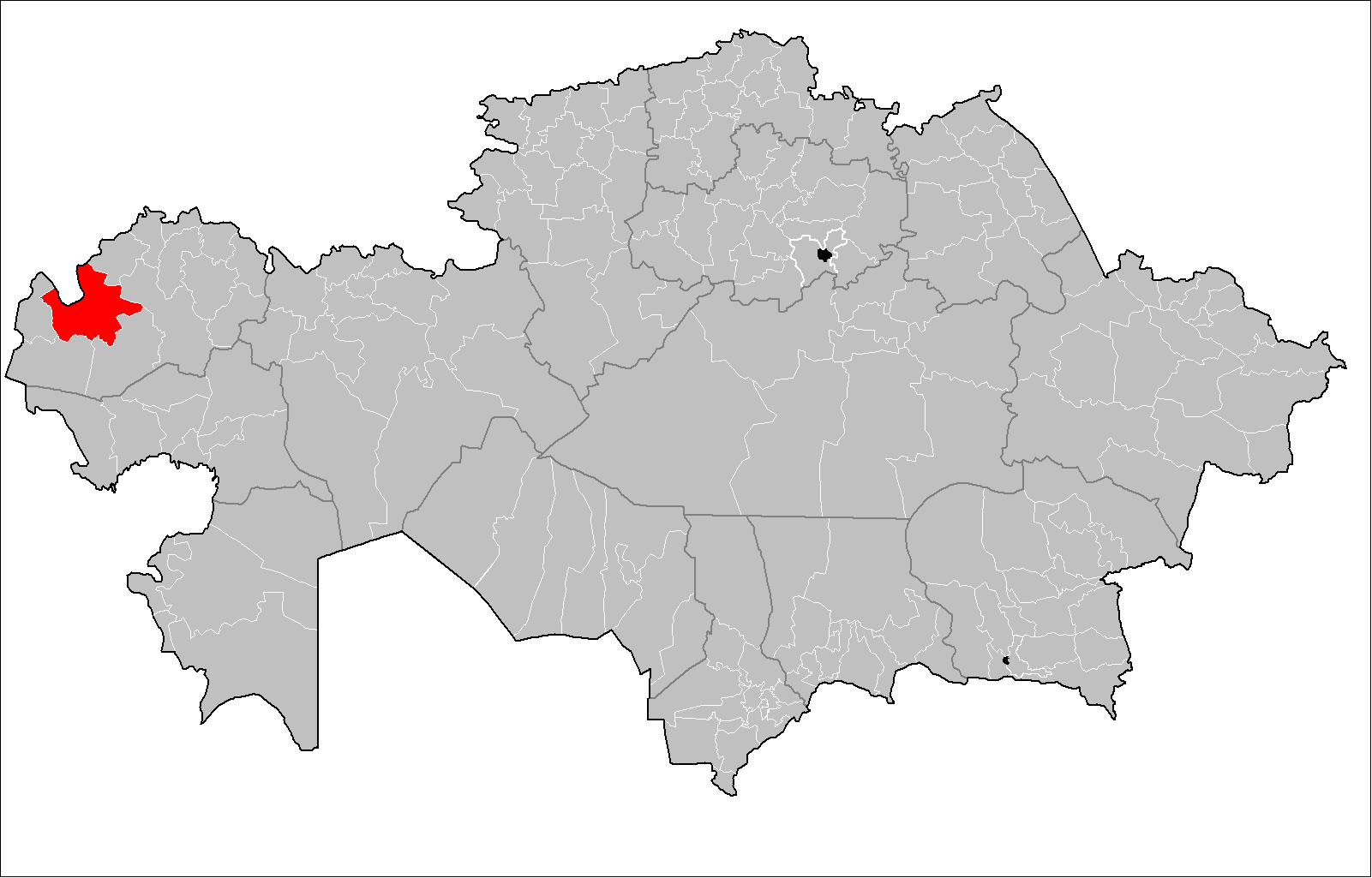
- Location of Kaztalov District in Kazakhstan
- Country: Kazakhstan
- Region: West Kazakhstan Region
- Administrative center: Kaztalovka

Government
  - Akim: Zulkashev Rustem Mulkayevich

Population (2013)
  - Total: 31,089
- Time zone: UTC+5 (West)

Kaztalov (Kazakh: Казталов ауданы, Kaztalov audany) is a district of West Kazakhstan Region in western Kazakhstan. The administrative center of the district is the selo of Kaztalovka. Population: 31,089 (2013 estimate); 32,908 (2009 census results); 38,703 (1999 census results).

== Geography ==
The district is located in the northern part of the Caspian Depression. The Ashchyozek river flows across it.
