= Taipak =

Taipak Тайпақ
- Village
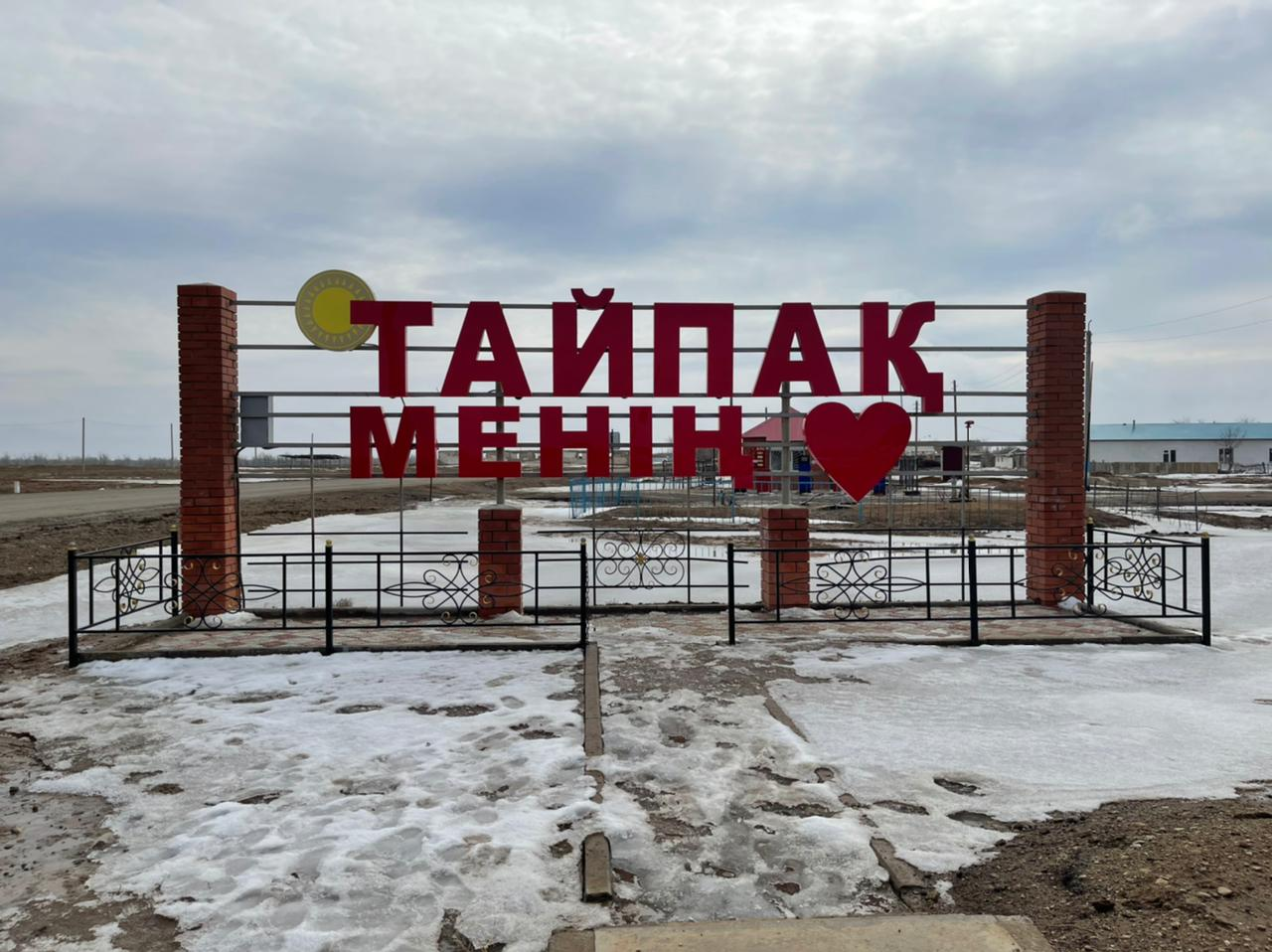

- Location within Kazakhstan
- Coordinates: 49°02′03″N 51°49′44″E
- Country: Kazakhstan
- Region: West Kazakhstan Region
- District: Akzhaik District

Population (2009)
  - Total: 4,692
- Time zone: UTC+5 (UTC + 5)

Taipak (Kazakh: Тайпақ), until 1996 known as Kalmykovo (Russian: Калмыково) is a village in western Kazakhstan. It is the administrative center of Taipak Rural District (KATO code - 273273100), Akzhaik District in the West Kazakhstan Region. Population: 4,692 (2009 census results); 5,070 (1999 census results). The rural district includes Taipak, Tompak and Shabdarzhap (Шабдаржап), former Kharkino.

== Geography ==
Taipak is located on the right bank of the Ural River. The Bagyrlai flows 15 km (9.3 mi) to the west.

=== Climate ===
Climate data for Taipak (1991–2020)
Month	Jan	Feb	Mar	Apr	May	Jun	Jul	Aug	Sep	Oct	Nov	Dec	Year
Mean daily maximum °C (°F)	−5.2 (22.6)	−3.8 (25.2)	4.7 (40.5)	17.2 (63.0)	25.5 (77.9)	31.2 (88.2)	33.4 (92.1)	32.0 (89.6)	24.4 (75.9)	15.0 (59.0)	3.8 (38.8)	−3.2 (26.2)	14.6 (58.3)
Daily mean °C (°F)	−8.9 (16.0)	−8.4 (16.9)	−0.5 (31.1)	10.3 (50.5)	18.2 (64.8)	23.9 (75.0)	26.2 (79.2)	24.3 (75.7)	16.9 (62.4)	8.5 (47.3)	−0.5 (31.1)	−6.6 (20.1)	8.6 (47.5)
Mean daily minimum °C (°F)	−12.2 (10.0)	−12.1 (10.2)	−4.6 (23.7)	4.5 (40.1)	11.7 (53.1)	17.0 (62.6)	19.4 (66.9)	17.4 (63.3)	10.4 (50.7)	3.4 (38.1)	−3.6 (25.5)	−9.6 (14.7)	3.5 (38.3)
Average precipitation mm (inches)	15.5 (0.61)	13.4 (0.53)	14.3 (0.56)	20.4 (0.80)	18.4 (0.72)	17.3 (0.68)	14.4 (0.57)	12.5 (0.49)	14.8 (0.58)	19.2 (0.76)	15.1 (0.59)	16.6 (0.65)	191.9 (7.56)
Average precipitation days (≥ 1.0 mm)	4.8	3.5	4.1	4.1	3.7	3.3	2.6	2.3	2.6	3.9	3.9	4.7	43.5
Source: NOAA
