= Galka, Perm Krai =

Galka Галка
- Settlement
- Location within Perm Krai Location within Russia
- Coordinates: 59°23′N 57°21′E
- Country: Russia
- Region: Perm Krai
- District: Alexandrovsky District
- Time zone: UTC+5:00

Galka (Russian: Галка) is a rural locality (a settlement) in Yayvinskoye Urban Settlement, Alexandrovsky District, Perm Krai, Russia. The population was 1 as of 2010. There is 1 street.

== Geography ==
Galka is located 37 km north of Alexandrovsk (the district's administrative centre) by road. Baza is the nearest rural locality.
