= Saykyn =

Saykhin Сайқын
- Town
- Сайхин
- Location within Kazakhstan
- Coordinates: 48°48′45″N 46°45′49″E
- Country: Kazakhstan
- Region: West Kazakhstan Region
- District: Bokey Orda District

Population (2009)
  - Total: 3,686
- Time zone: UTC+5 (UTC + 5)

Saykhin (Kazakh: Сайқын, Saiqyn; Russian: Сайхин) is a village in far western Kazakhstan on the border with Russia. It is the administrative center of Bokey Orda District in West Kazakhstan Region. Population: 3,686 (2009 census results); 3,996 (1999 census results).

== Geography ==
Lake Botkul is located near Saykyn. There is a station of the Volga Railway in the village.
