= Kaztalovka =

Kaztalovka Казталовка
- Town
- Location within Kazakhstan
- Coordinates: 49°45′27″N 48°41′42″E
- Country: Kazakhstan
- Region: West Kazakhstan Region
- District: Kaztalov District

Population (2009)
  - Total: 5,055
- Time zone: UTC+5 (UTC + 5)

Kaztalovka (Kazakh: Казталовка, Russian: Казталовка) is a village that is located in north-western Kazakhstan.

It is the administrative center of Kaztalov District, in the West Kazakhstan Region. Population: 5,055 (2009 census results); 5,008 (1999 census results).
