= Bokey Orda District =

Coordinates: 48°48′45″N 46°45′49″E

Bokey Orda Бөкей Орда
- District
- Бөкей Орда ауданы
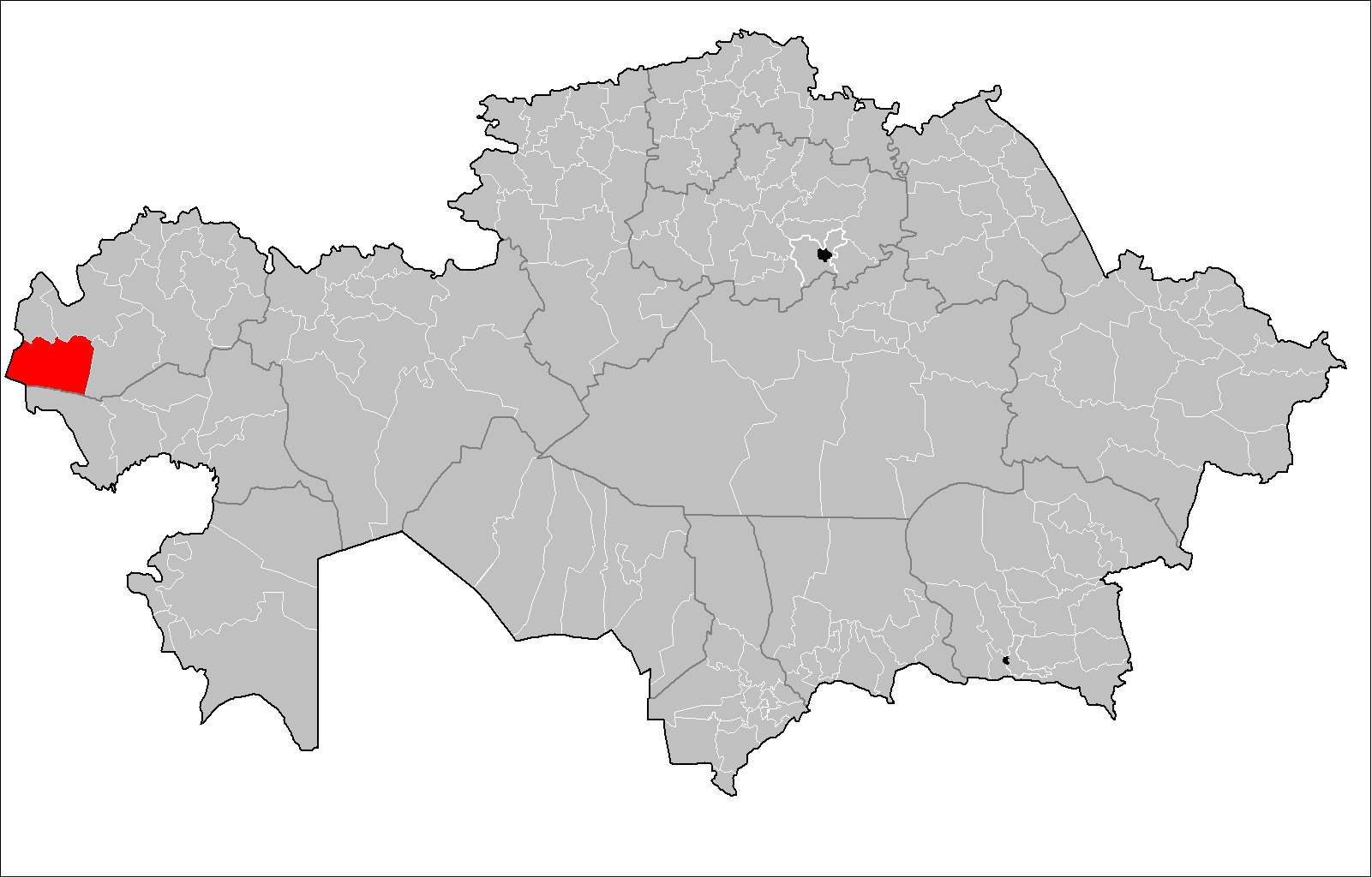
- Country: Kazakhstan
- Region: West Kazakhstan Region
- Administrative center: Saykyn

Government
  - Akim: Daumov Nurlybek Zhaskayratovich

Population (2013)
  - Total: 16,016
- Time zone: UTC+5 (West)

Bokey Orda (Kazakh: Бөкей Орда ауданы, Bökei Orda audany) is a district of West Kazakhstan Region in western Kazakhstan. The administrative center of the district is the selo of Saykyn. Population: 16,016 (2013 estimate); 16,668 (2009 census results); 19,507 (1999 census results).

== Geography ==
Lake Aralsor is located in the district.
