= Obshchy Syrt =

Coordinates: 52.2969°N 52.1873°E

Obshchy Syrt (Russian: Общий Сырт, pronounced [ˈopɕːɪj sɨrt]) is a highland ridge, or plateau (syrt), in the European part of Russia. It starts north of Orenburg as a branch of the Ural Mountains and runs in a southwesterly direction to the east bank of the Volga River. River Shagan, a tributary of the Ural, has its sources in the highlands.

These highlands forms the watershed between the rivers Volga and Ural, and are also part of the boundary between Europe and Asia. In the eastern sector the Obshchy Syrt reaches heights of over 500 meters.

The north slope of the Obshchy Syrt is covered by deciduous forests, while the southern slope towards the Caspian Depression has the characteristics of a steppe.
