= Galka, Volgograd Oblast =

Galka Галка
- Selo
- Location within Volgograd Oblast Location within Russia
- Coordinates: 50°22′N 45°47′E
- Country: Russia
- Region: Volgograd Oblast
- District: Kamyshinsky District
- Time zone: UTC+4:00

Galka (Russian: Га́лка) is a rural locality (a selo) in Verkhnedobrinskoye Rural Settlement, Kamyshinsky District, Volgograd Oblast, Russia. The population was 207 as of 2010. There are 6 streets.

== Geography ==
Galka is located on the Volga Upland, on the west bank of the Volgograd Reservoir, 52 km northeast of Kamyshin (the district's administrative centre) by road. Butkovka is the nearest rural locality.
