= Ryn Desert =

Desert region of European Russia and Kazakhstan

Ryn Desert Нарын құмы / Рын-пески
- Desert
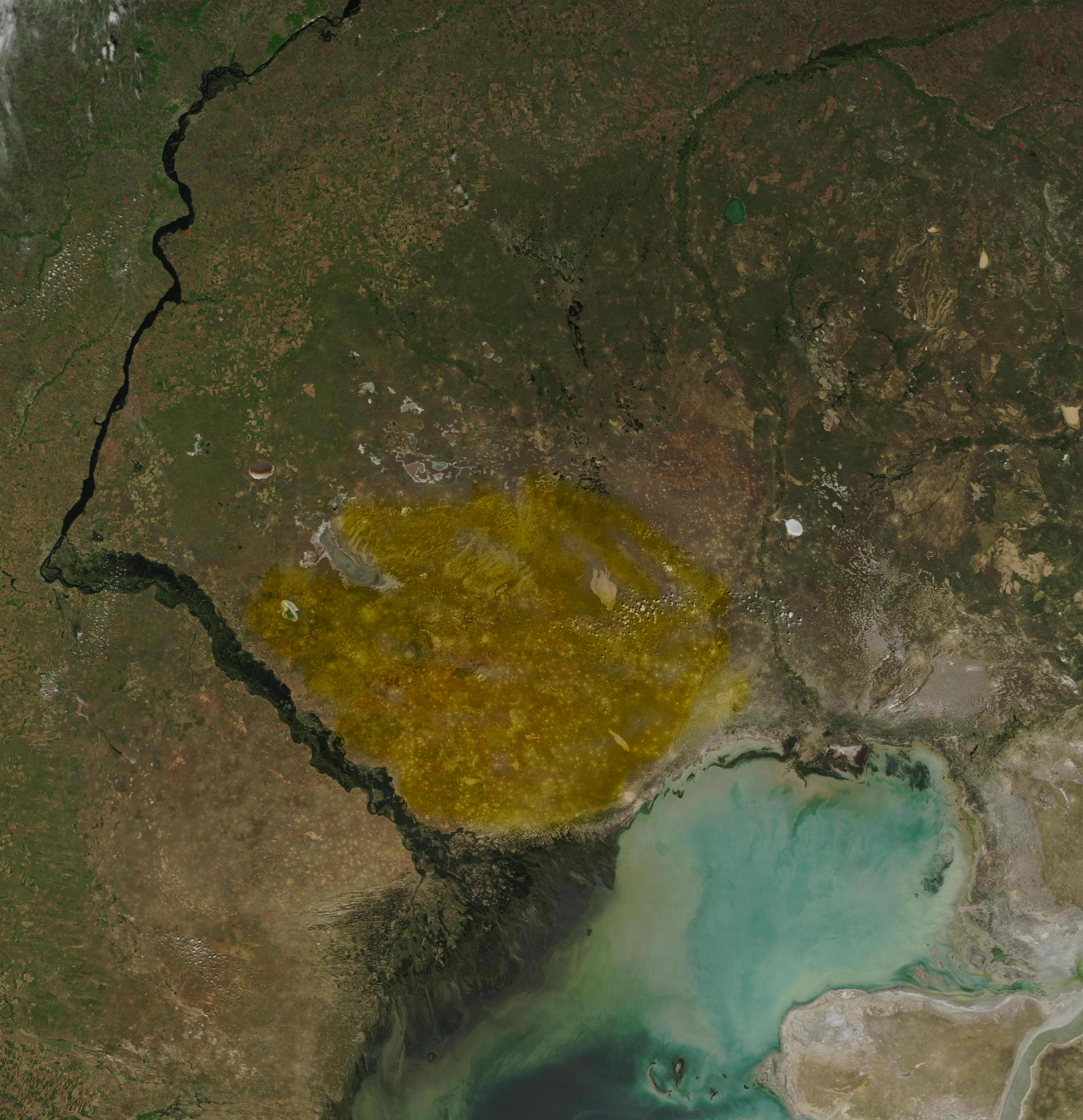
- Ryn Desert area NASA image

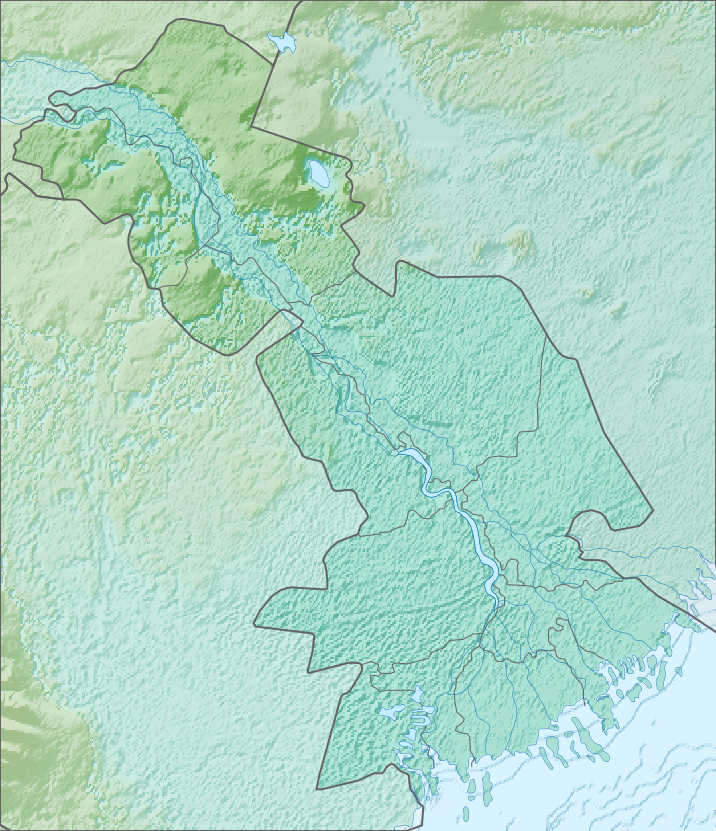
- Coordinates: 47°20′00″N 48°50′00″E

Area
  - Total: 40,000 km^{2} (15,000 sq mi)
- Highest elevation: 100 meters (330 ft)
- Surface elevation: −20 m (−66 ft)

The Ryn Desert or Ryn-Peski Desert (Kazakh: Нарын құмы, Naryn-Qūmy; Russian: Рын-пески) is a desert in western Kazakhstan and Astrakhan Oblast, Russia.

== Geography ==
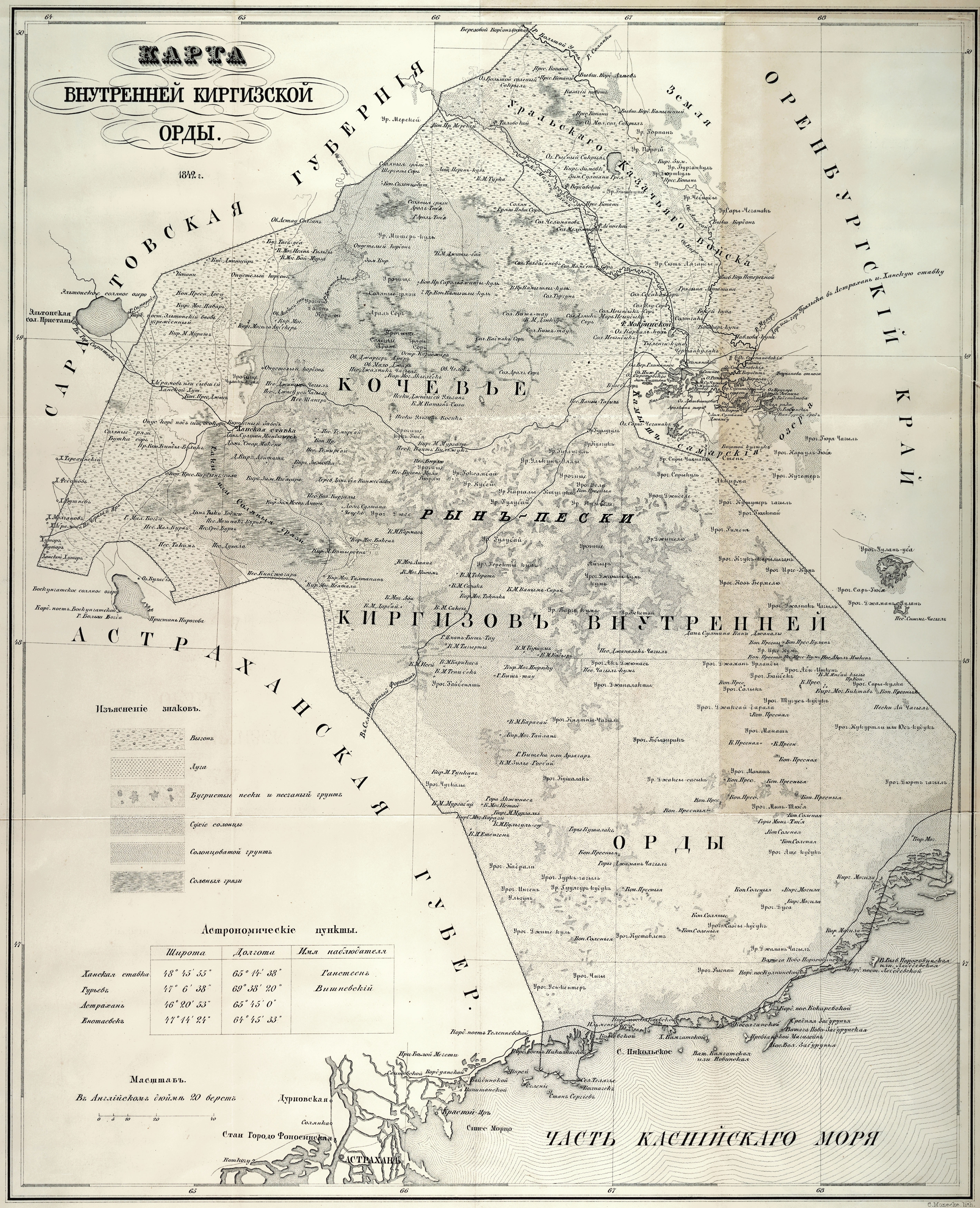
A 1842 Russian map showing the location of "Рын-пески"

It is located north of the Caspian Sea and southeast of the Volga Upland. The borders of the desert are very loosely defined. Some maps show the desert almost entirely within the Caspian Depression, stretching almost to the coast of the Caspian Sea, while others show it north of the depression. It lies west of the Ural River between 46° N and 49° N latitude, and 48° E to 52° E longitude. Many small towns are scattered throughout the Ryn Desert, and population density is between 1 and 15 people per square mile. Aralsor lake lies at the northern edge.

== Climate ==
The desert lies in a semi-arid climate zone, and receives very little rainfall.

Temperatures can reach extreme highs of 45 to 48 °C (113 to 118 °F) during summer and in winter they can drop to a low of −28 to −36 °C (−18 to −33 °F).

High winds sweep across the desert, and in 2001 a dust storm in the Baltic Sea was determined as originating in the Ryn Desert. A study of long-range dust transportation to the Baltic Sea region—by analyzing dust pollution in Scandinavia, showed that aerosol concentrations there were influenced more by the Ryn Desert region than the Sahara Desert in Africa.

== See also ==
- Caspian lowland desert ecoregion
