= Caspian Depression =

Low-lying flatland region encompassing the northern part of the Caspian Sea

- Depression
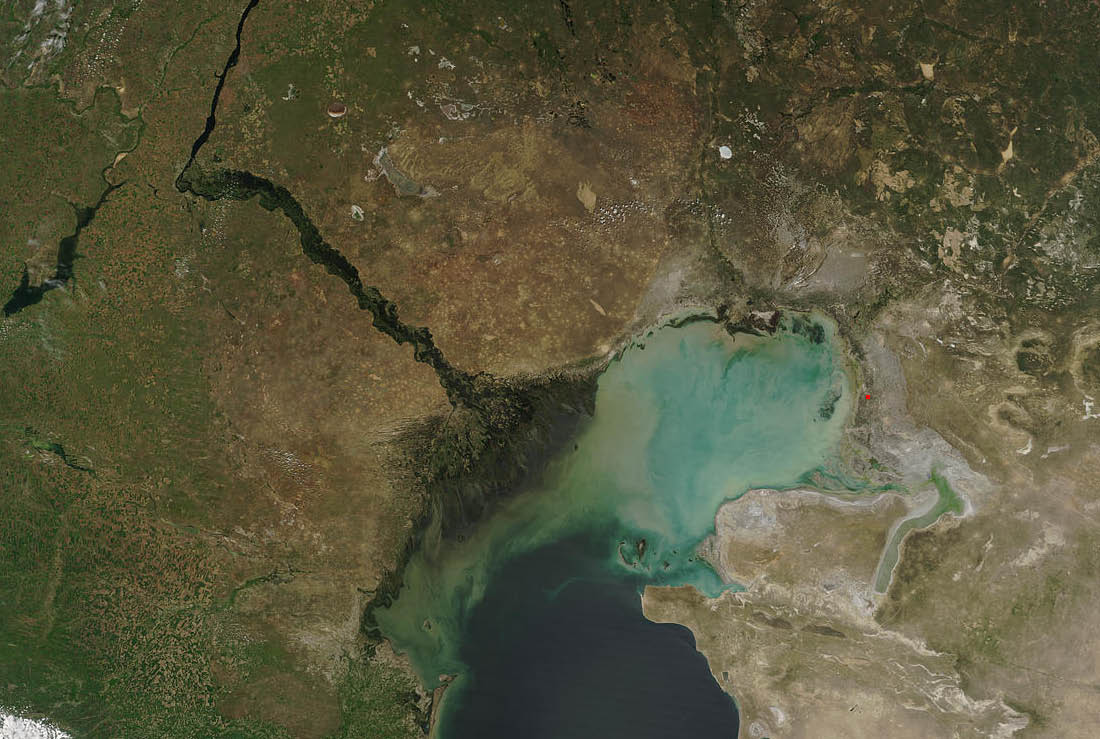
- Caspian Depression and north Caspian Sea from space. NASA photo

- Coordinates: 47°32′N 49°00′E

Area
  - Total: 200,000 km^{2} (77,000 sq mi)

The Caspian Depression (Note: Kazakh: Каспий маңы ойпаты, romanized: Kaspii mañy oipaty, IPA: [kɐsˈpʲij mɑŋˈə wojpɑˈtə]; Russian: Прикаспийская низменность, IPA: [prʲɪkɐˈspʲijskəjə ˈnʲizmʲɪnnəsʲtʲ]; lit. 'Pricaspian/Peri-Caspian Depression/Lowland') or the Caspian Lowland is a low-lying flatland region encompassing the northern part of the Caspian Sea, the largest enclosed body of water on Earth. It is the larger northern part of the wider Aral–Caspian Depression around the Aral and Caspian Seas.

The level of the Caspian sea is 28 metres (92 ft) below sea level, however several areas in the depression are even lower, and among them Karagiye near Aktau is the lowest at −132 metres (−433 ft).

== Geography ==
The depression is in the southeastern part of the East European Plain and covers parts of Kazakhstan and Russia. In Kazakhstan it covers parts of Atyrau Region, West Kazakhstan Region, and Mangystau Region. In Russia it covers parts of Dagestan, Kalmykia, Saratov Oblast, Volgograd Oblast, Astrakhan Oblast, and Stavropol Krai. In the north it is bounded by Obshchy Syrt highland; in the west by Volga Upland, Yergeni, and Stavropol Upland; in the east by Ustyurt Plateau and Sub-Ural Plateau (a.k.a. Cis-Ural Plateau, Pre-Ural Plateau, Poduralskoe Plateau) It significantly overlaps with the Ryn Desert.

The Volga River and the Ural River flow into the Caspian Sea through this region. The deltas of the Ural and Volga Rivers are extensive wetlands. The main rivers of the lowland beside the Volga and the Ural are the Emba, Terek and Kuma. There are also numerous salt lakes, such as Baskunchak, Inder, Aralsor, Kamys-Samar Lakes, Elton and Botkul.

The North Caspian depression is part of the continental or semi-arid desert biome. The area receives 300 mm (12 in) of rain per year, on average, and less than 10% of the region is irrigated.

The Caspian Depression is below sea level, consisting of large areas of marshlands in the eastern region. It is one of the largest flat lowland areas in Central Asia, covering approximately 200,000 km^{2} (77,000 sq mi). The area is very rich in underground oil and gas reserves, and oil and natural gas pipelines cross the depression from north to south and east to west. Many geologists believe the Caspian Sea and the depression were formed by tectonic forces. Some of them also believe that the North Caspian depression became separated from the open ocean in ancient times to form an enormous salt lake. Part of the ancient Silk Road ran through this region. The two largest cities in the depression are Astrakhan in Russia and Atyrau in Kazakhstan. Today, the region is used mainly for livestock raising.

The depression is also noted for salt domes, particularly Volgograd salt. It increases dramatically as one travels from the Ryn Desert toward the Caspian Sea. Russian satellite photos have revealed huge deposits of salt domes (about 1,200), in the Caspian Depression in western Kazakhstan. One dome, called the Chelkar Deposit, covers an area of 3,237 km^{2} (1,250 sq mi) and is nearly 8 kilometres (5 mi) deep.

The southern region of the depression, or the north coast of the Caspian Sea, is characterized by the large development of damp sites resulting from tidal phenomena. The depression is also home to many insect species, with several thousand different species likely living in the region around the Caspian Sea. Studies have shown that water pollution, mostly coming from the Volga River, poses a serious threat to the biodiversity of the Caspian Depression. Water pollution is contributed mainly by industrial, agricultural, and household discharges.

The highest point in the depression is Mount Bogdo at 152 metres (499 ft) above sea level.

== See also ==
- Caspian lowland desert

== Sources ==
- "Evaporites of North Border of North Caspian Depression". Internet Geology News Letter. No. 178, January 13, 2003.
- "Exploring Asian Salt Domes". SatBytes. Space Today Online.
