= Pallasovka (town) =

Town in Volgograd Oblast, Russia

Pallasovka Палласовка
- Town
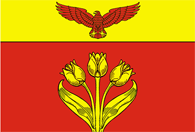
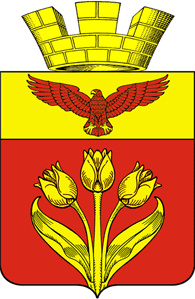
- Flag Coat of arms
- Interactive map of Pallasovka
- Location of Pallasovka Pallasovka (Volgograd Oblast)
- Coordinates: 50°03′N 46°53′E
- Country: Russia
- Federal subject: Volgograd Oblast
- Administrative district: Pallasovsky District
- Town of district significanceSelsoviet: Pallasovka
- Founded: 1907
- Town status since: 1967
- Elevation: 30 m (98 ft)

Population (2010 Census)
  - Total: 16,081
  - Estimate (2021): 14,966 (−6.9%)

Administrative status
  - Capital of: Pallasovsky District, town of district significance of Pallasovka

Municipal status
  - Municipal district: Pallasovsky Municipal District
  - Urban settlement: Pallasovka Urban Settlement
  - Capital of: Pallasovsky Municipal District, Pallasovka Urban Settlement
- Time zone: UTC+3 (MSK)
- Postal code: 404263
- OKTMO ID: 18645101001

Pallasovka (Russian: Палла́совка) is a town and the administrative center of Pallasovsky District in Volgograd Oblast, Russia, located on the Torgun (which flows into the Volgograd Reservoir), 301 kilometers (187 mi) northeast of Volgograd, the administrative center of the oblast. Population: 16,081 (2010 census); 17,163 (2002 census); 17,712 (1989 Soviet census).

== History ==
It was founded in 1907 as a settlement of Torgun (Торгунь) servicing the construction of a railway station of the same name. That same year, Torgun was renamed Pallasovka in honor of an academician Peter Pallas (1741–1811), who visited the area in 1773–1774. It was granted town status in 1967.

== Administrative and municipal status ==
Within the framework of administrative divisions, Pallasovka serves as the administrative center of Pallasovsky District. As an administrative division, it is, together with three rural localities, incorporated within Pallasovsky District as the town of district significance of Pallasovka.

As a municipal division, the territory of Pallasovka is incorporated within Pallasovsky Municipal District as Pallasovka Urban Settlement. The three rural localities are incorporated as Limannoye Rural Settlement of Pallasovsky Municipal District.

== The meteorite ==
Peter Pallas was a famous naturalist who took part in the discovery and the study of the first pallasite, a type of stony-iron meteorite named after him. Coincidentally, Pallasovka is a pallasite meteorite found near the town and named after it.
