= Pallasovsky District =

Pallasovsky District Палласовский район (Russian)
- District
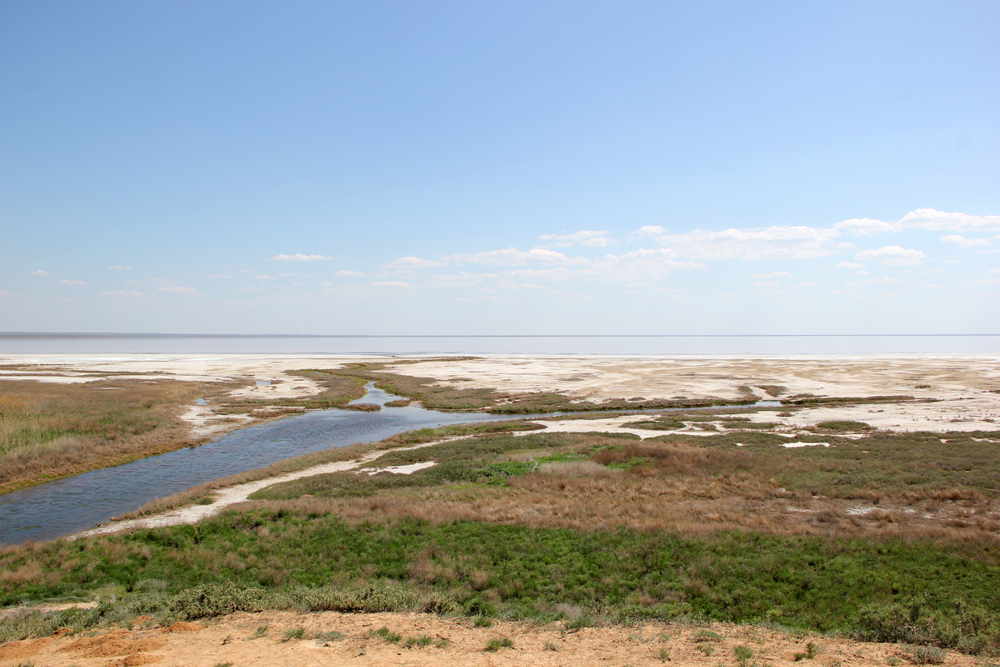
- Eltonsky Lake Nature Park, Pallasovsky District

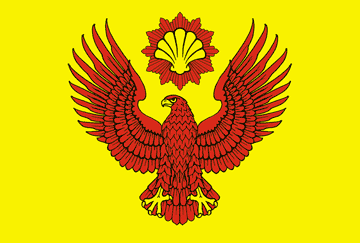
- Flag Coat of arms
- Location of Pallasovsky District in Volgograd Oblast
- Coordinates: 50°03′N 46°53′E
- Country: Russia
- Federal subject: Volgograd Oblast
- Established: 7 September 1941
- Administrative center: Pallasovka

Area
  - Total: 10,700 km^{2} (4,100 sq mi)

Population (2010 Census)
  - Total: 43,293
  - Density: 4.05/km^{2} (10.5/sq mi)
  - Urban: 37.1%
  - Rural: 62.9%

Administrative structure
  - Administrative divisions: 1 Towns of district significance, 12 Selsoviets
  - Inhabited localities: 1 cities/towns, 53 rural localities

Municipal structure
  - Municipally incorporated as: Pallasovsky Municipal District
  - Municipal divisions: 1 urban settlements, 14 rural settlements
- Time zone: UTC+3 (MSK)
- OKTMO ID: 18645000
- Website: http://admpallas.ru/

Pallasovsky District (Russian: Палла́совский райо́н) is an administrative district (raion), one of the thirty-three in Volgograd Oblast, Russia. As a municipal division, it is incorporated as Pallasovsky Municipal District. It is located in the east of the oblast. The area of the district is 10,700 square kilometers (4,100 sq mi). Its administrative center is the town of Pallasovka. Population: 43,293 (2010 census); 47,347 (2002 Census); 48,013 (1989 Soviet census). The population of Pallasovka accounts for 37.1% of the district's total population.
