= List of rivers of Kazakhstan =

This is a list of rivers of Kazakhstan, arranged by drainage basin. Tributaries are listed in order from mouth to source.

== Flowing into the Arctic Ocean ==
=== Ob ===
==== Irtysh (Ertis) River ====
- Tobol
  - Ubagan
  - Ayat
  - Uy
  - Syntasty
- Ishim
  - Imanburlyq
  - Aqqanburlyq
  - Terisaqqan
  - Zhabay
  - Kalkutan
    - Boksyk
    - Arshaly
- Shagan
  - Ashchysu
- Uba
- Ulba
- Bukhtarma
  - Lukina
- Naryn
- Kürshim

== Flowing into endorheic basins ==
=== Caspian Depression ===
- Volga River
  - Akhtuba (distributary)
    - Kigach (distributary)
- Ural River
  - Shagan
  - Utva (Shynghyrlau)
  - Ilek
    - Kargaly
  - Or
- Bolshoy Uzen (Ülken Özen)
- Maly Uzen (Kishi Özen)
- Emba
- Aschiagar River
- Saghyz
- Uil
- Ashchyozek

=== Aral Sea ===
==== Syr Darya ====
- Sarysu
  - Zhaman Sarysu
  - Taldymanaka
  - Atasu (river)
  - Karakengir
- Chu (Shu)
  - Talas
    - Asa
  - Ak-Suu
  - Kichi-Kemin
- Bögen
- Arys
  - Badam
    - Sayramsu
  - Mashat
  - Boralday
- Keles
- Sabyrzhylga

=== Akkol ===
- Uly-Zhylanshyk

=== Akmolaisor ===
- Saryozen (Irtysh basin)

=== Shalkarteniz ===
- Turgay
  - Irgiz
  - Ulkayak
  - Saryozen
    - Ulken Damdi
- Tegene
- Zhyngyldyozek
- Kalmakkyrgan
- Baikonyr
- Zhymyky

=== Lake Tengiz ===
- Nura
  - Sherubainura
  - Akbastau
  - Ashchysu
  - Ulken Kundyzdy
- Kulanotpes
  - Kon
  - Sonaly

=== Balkhash-Alakol Basin ===
- Ili
  - Charyn
  - Chilik
  - Esentai
- Karatal
  - Koksu
- Büyen
- Qapal
- Lepsy
- Aksu (Lake Balkhash)
- Ayagöz
- Issyk
- Tokrau
- Bakanas

=== Lake Alakol ===
- Emil
- Urzhar

=== Karasor Basin ===
- Karasu
- Karkaraly
- Taldy
- Zharly

=== Lake Shalkar ===
- Bolgasyn
- Kauylzhyr
- Zhylandysay

=== Sholaksor ===
- Teneke

=== Lake Shyganak ===
- Shiderti

=== Lake Siletiteniz ===
- Sileti

=== Ulken Azhbolat ===
- Burla

=== Lake Zhalanashkol ===
- Terekty
