= Uvelka River =

Uvelka
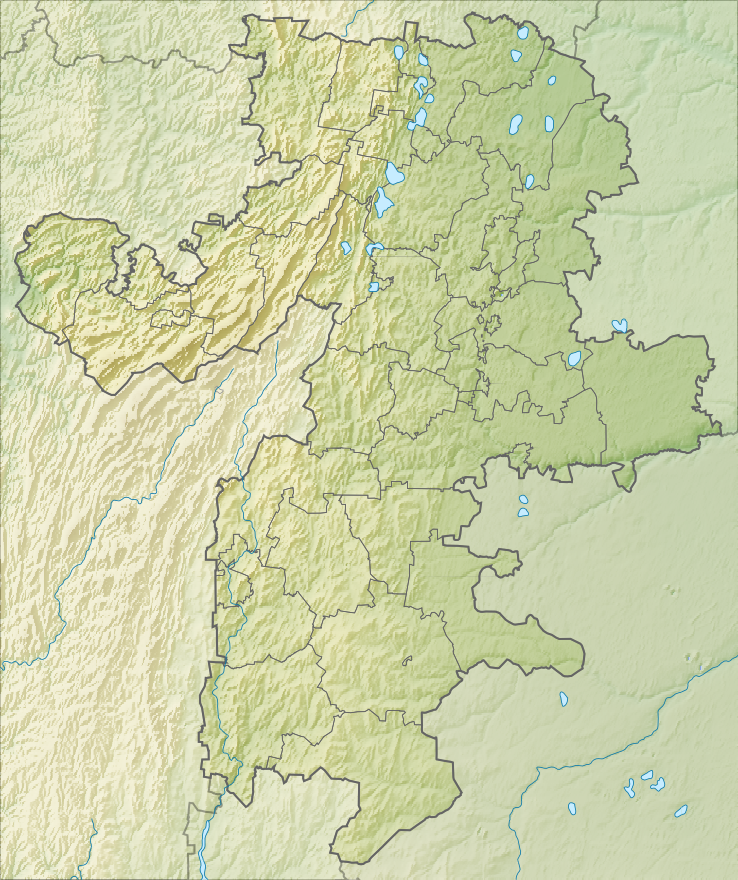
- Location of the Uvelka River's mouth in Chelyabinsk Oblast

Location
- Country: Russia
- Region: Chelyabinsk Oblast

Physical characteristics
- Source
  - location: Chebarkulsky District, Chelyabinsk Oblast
- Mouth: Uy River
  - location: Near Troitsk, Chelyabinsk Oblast
  - coordinates: 54°04′47″N 61°34′41″E
- Length: 234 km (145 mi)

The Uvelka River is a river in the Chelyabinsk Oblast of Russia. It is a left tributary of the Uy River, which in turn flows into the Tobol River. The river is approximately 234 kilometers long and flows entirely within the borders of Chelyabinsk Oblast.

== Course ==
The Uvelka originates in the Chebarkulsky District and flows southeast through several municipalities, including the town of Yuzhnouralsk. In Yuzhnouralsk, the river is dammed to form a reservoir that supplies water to a local hydroelectric plant.

Basically, it flows into the Uy River near the town of Troitsk. Towns along the river include Yuzhnouralsk and Troitsk. These towns rely on the river for water supply, agriculture, and limited industrial use.

== Tributaries ==
- Malaya Uvelka
- Burlya
- Kokuy
- Kumlyak
- Tatarka
- Karasu
- Kabanka

== See also ==
- List of rivers of Russia
- Uy River
- Tobol River
