= 1771 Torghut migration =

Exodus of Kalmyk people to Dzungaria

Kalmyk exodus to Dzungaria
- Part of Kalmyk–Russian Wars, Kazakh–Kalmyk Wars
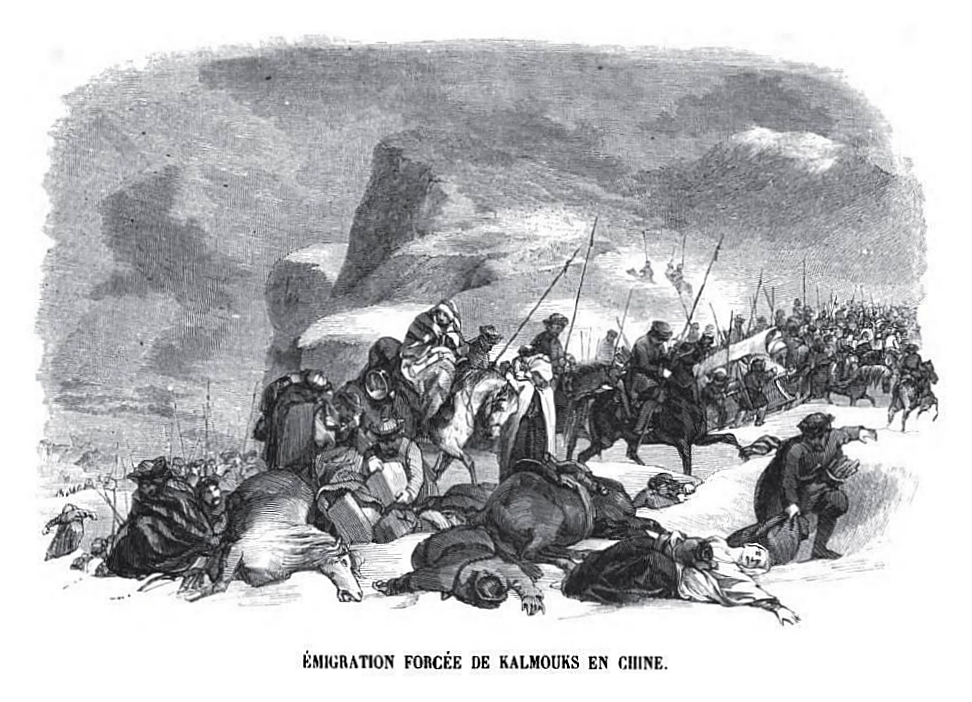
- Kalmyk exodus to Dzungaria. Engraving by Charles Michel Geoffroy, 1845.
Date	January 5th–July 24th, 1771
Location	Volga river, Emba river, Yaik river, Or, Sagyz rivers, Aktobe Region, Turgai River, Karaganda Region, Lake Balkhash, Russia and Kazakhstan
Result	Kalmyk migration to Dzungaria; Liquidation of the Kalmyk Khanate; Heavy raids and casualties on Kazakh Khanate and Russian Empire (Note: Но встречается и резко другая точка зрения насчет числа дошедших калмыков, к примеру современные казахские источники оценивают число дошедших в 15-20 тысяч.)
Territorial changes	Annexation of the Kalmyk Khanate

Belligerents
Kalmyk Khanate	Russian Empire; Supported by: Kazakh Khanate

Commanders and leaders
(Kalmyk Khanate) Ubashi Khan (Kalmyk Khanate) Tsëbegdorji (Kalmyk Khanate) Šereng (Kalmyk Khanate) Bambar (Kalmyk Khanate) Momontu (Kalmyk Khanate) Various princes	Russian Empire: Catherine the Great; General von Traubenberg; Pirogov; Goglazin †; Kazakh Khanate: Nuraly Khan; Ablai Khan; Yaman-Kary; Aiguvak; Jamankur (POW); Janatai Batyr †; Arkandar †; Uysunbay

Strength
(Kalmyk Khanate) 10,000	(Russian Empire) & (Kazakh Khanate) : 7,000 50,000 batyrs

Casualties and losses
(Kalmyk Khanate) : 100,000(civilian); Heavy(military)	(Russian Empire) & (Kazakh Khanate) : Heavier

The Torghut migration or Kalmyk exodus to Dzungaria (also known as the 'Dusty trek' or the 'Torgutsky trek') was a mass migration in 1771 of the Kalmyk people, primarily Torghuts, from the Volga River region of the Russian Empire to the Dzungaria region in the Qing dynasty.

During the final conquest of Dzungaria, the Dzungar genocide resulted in the death of around 400,000 Dzungar Mongolians, or about 70% to 80% of the Dzungar population, perishing from warfare and disease. This led to the emergence of refugees in the Kalmyk Khanate, who advocated for the restoration of the Dzungar Khanate.

== Background ==
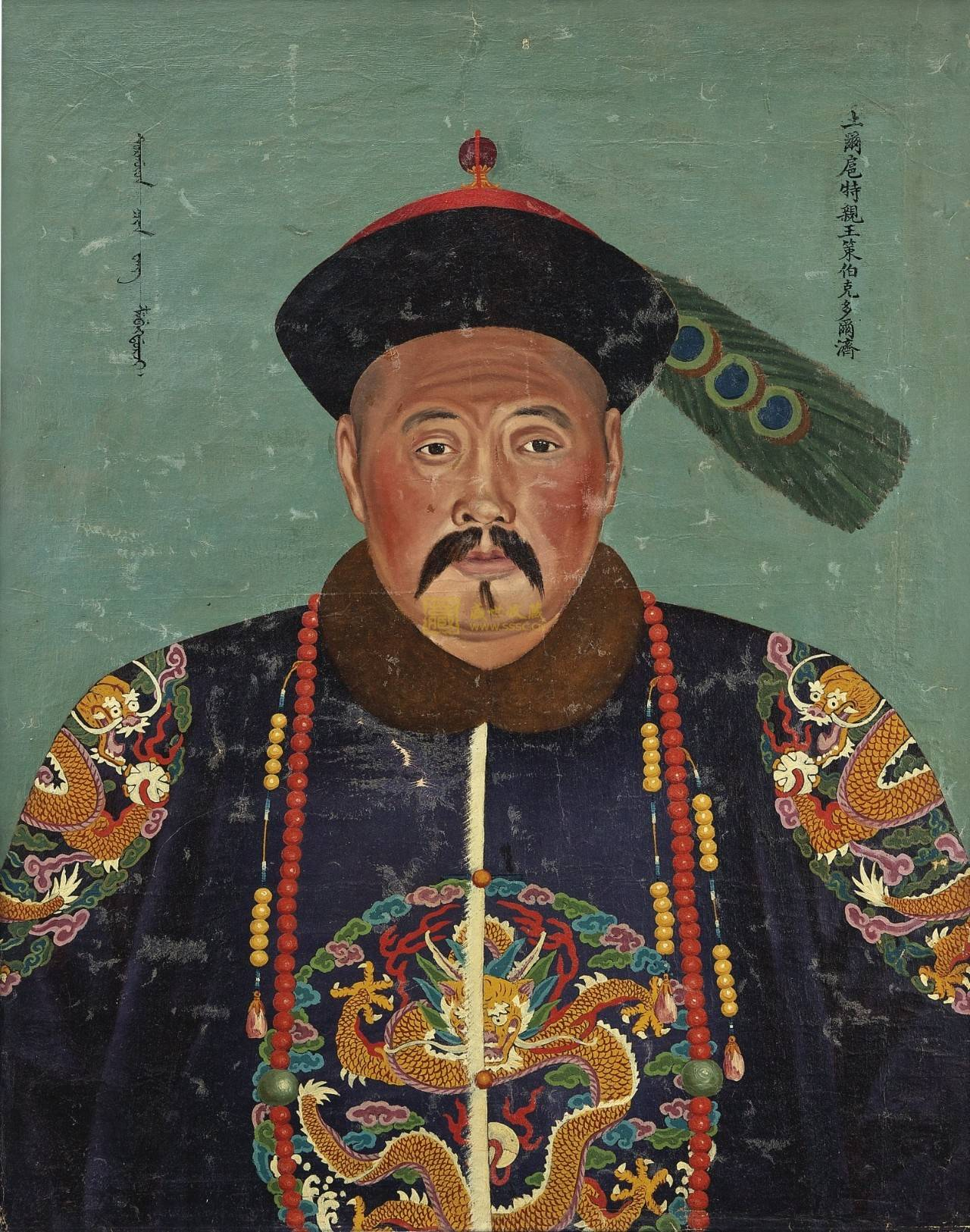
Tsebek-Dorji, a Kalmyk tayiji

In the Kalmyk khanate, the Russian government began to pursue a policy of limiting Ubashi and Dondook Khan's authority. In the 1760s, crises intensified in the Kalmyk Khanate, associated with the colonization of lands by Russian landowners and peasants, the reduction of pasture lands, the infringement of the rights of the ruling elite, and the interference of the tsarist administration in Kalmyk affairs.

The resettlement was prepared during 1767–1770 by the Torghut and Khoshut noyans, as well as the highest Buddhist clergy, who made an astrological forecast, determining a favorable year and month for the resettlement. In the autumn of 1770, Ubashi, returning from the Caucasian front of the Russo-Turkish War, held a meeting with various princes. The conclusion of the meeting had agreed to "leave Russia and return to the east to the homeland," deciding to begin action in the following year, 1771.

== Migration and conflicts ==
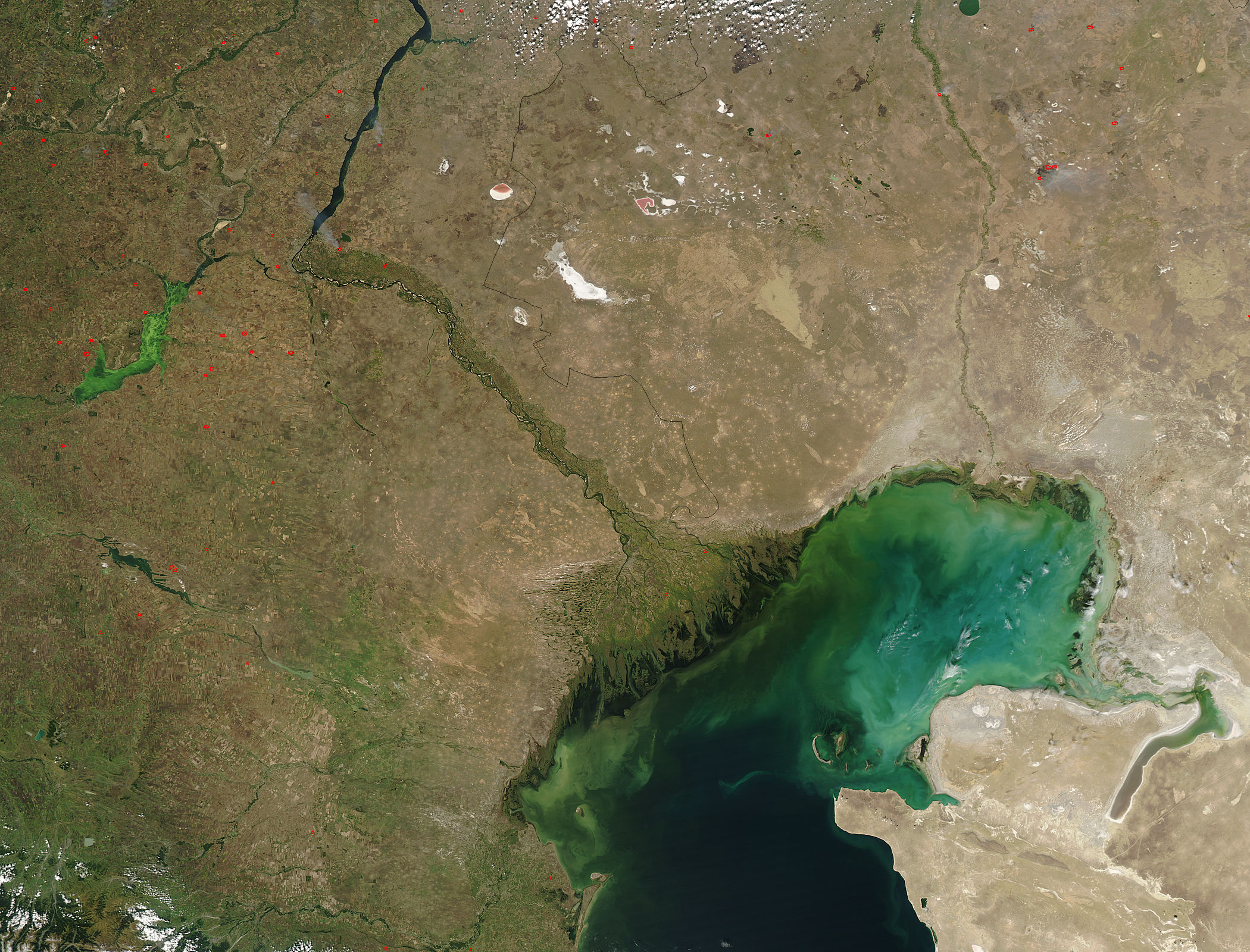
Satellite view of the Volga River.

On January 5, 1771, various noyons led by Ubashi Khan, roused the uluses roaming along the left bank of the Volga and began their migration to their historical homeland, Dzungaria. The Kalmyks of primarily Dörbets were unable or unwilling to join the migration. The Russian government's reaction was relatively mild. Remembering the Kalmyks' past services to the Russian empire, the military officials sent merely begged them to remain. Thus, the Erketenevsky ulus was stopped.

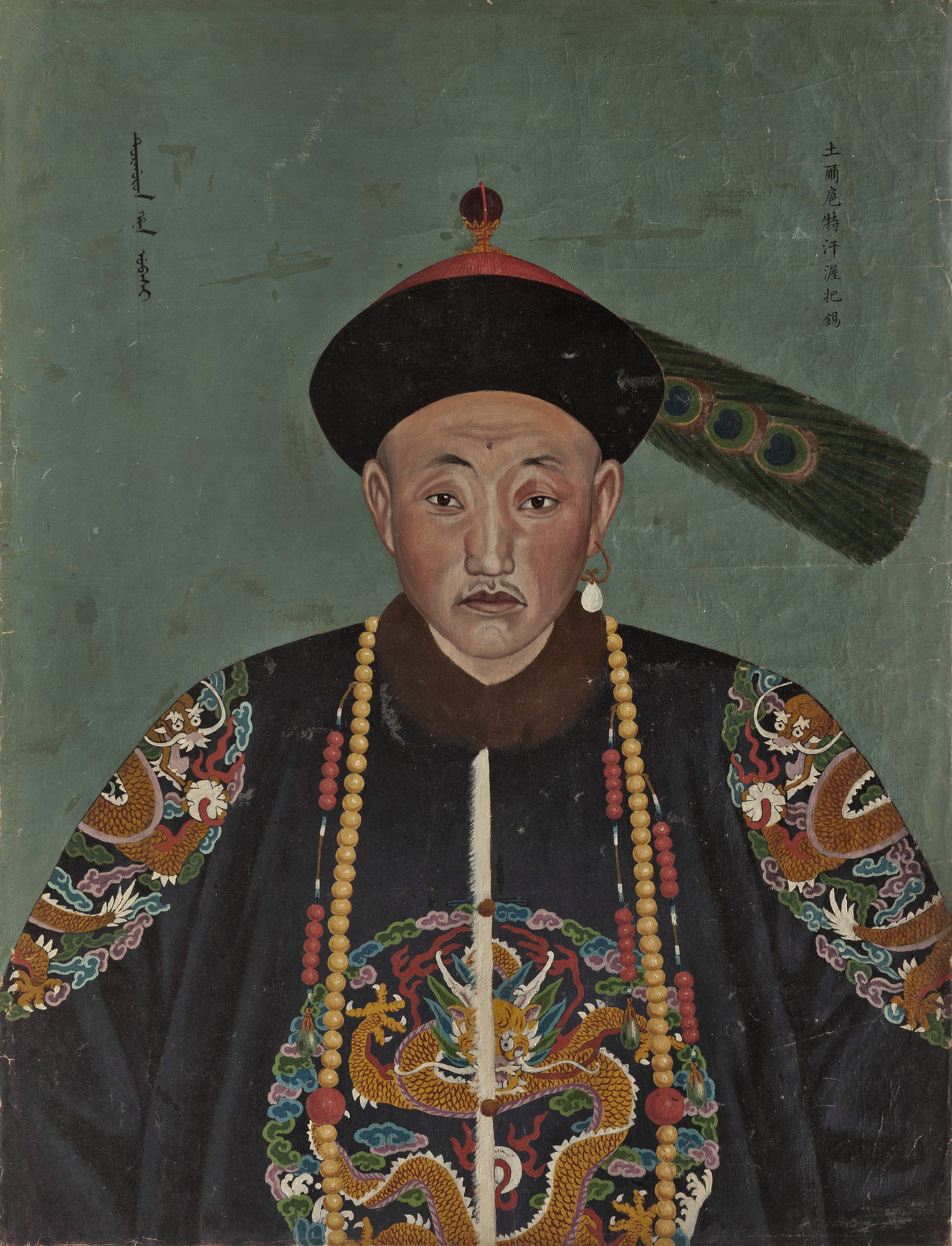
Portrait of Ubashi Khan, the last Khan of the Kalmyk Khanate.

During their migration, the Kalmyks had reached the Yaik river, the Yaik Cossacks of the Vetlyaninskaya stanitsa, Goglazin, were killed in a floodplain along with several Cossacks. The Kalmyks killed, plundered, and burned everything along their path. During their plunder, they had captured: goods, money, and livestock worth 607,945 rubles 25 kopecks were taken; 13 were killed, 102 were taken prisoner, 32 were wounded, and 8 people were missing. The Erketenevsky ulus, nomadic near Tsaritsyn, plundered the market and captured its people. When the ulus was repulsed from the general masses and returned from the Yaik, all those captured at the market were killed to prevent their involvement in the plundering. Krasnoyarsk Commandant Pirogov reported on January 8 and 9 that Kalmyks were plundering gangs and threatening the city. The Kalmyks later attacked 44 Yaik Cossacks, who fished near Uzen.

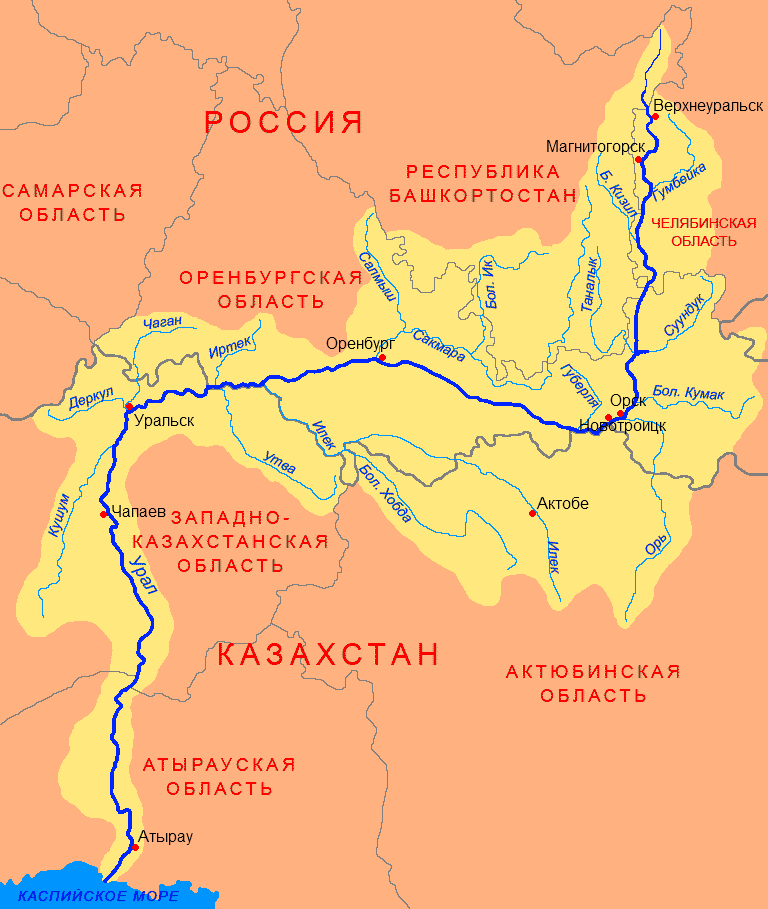
View of the Ural River (Also as the Yaik River) basin.

On January 27, to counter the migration of the Kalmyks, the government of the Queen Catherine II sent a circular to the Yaik Cossacks, the governor of Orenburg, and the khans of the subject Kazakh Jüzes, Nurali Khan demanded Russian cannons and a dragoon regiment to stop the Kalmyk advance and General von Traubenberg, in his report to the government, indicated that leaving Russian artillery and a dragoon regiment to assist Khan Nurali would mean their certain death, and was skeptical about the ability of the irregular militia of the Kazakh khans to independently, without the support of Russian troops, stop the Kalmyk army, which, according to him, with its own artillery and the combat experience of a regular army, would freely advance into the territory of its former nomadic camps in Dzungaria.

On February 18, the Kalmyks reached the banks of the Emba River, resting on the location until March 15, when the Kalmyks were attacked by the Kazakh detachment of Yaman-Kary. However, the Kazakhs were defeated, and skirmishes continued to occur on the Or and Sagyz rivers. Aiguvak later attacked the Myk lands, and men, women, and children were killed, and a total of 130 people were taken as prisoners of war. From March 18 to 23, the Kazakhs continued their skirmishes and raids against the Kalmyks, but their attacks were repelled by the Kalmyks with heavy losses on both sides. This directly led to the Junior Jüz ceasing open military clashes against the Kalmyks.

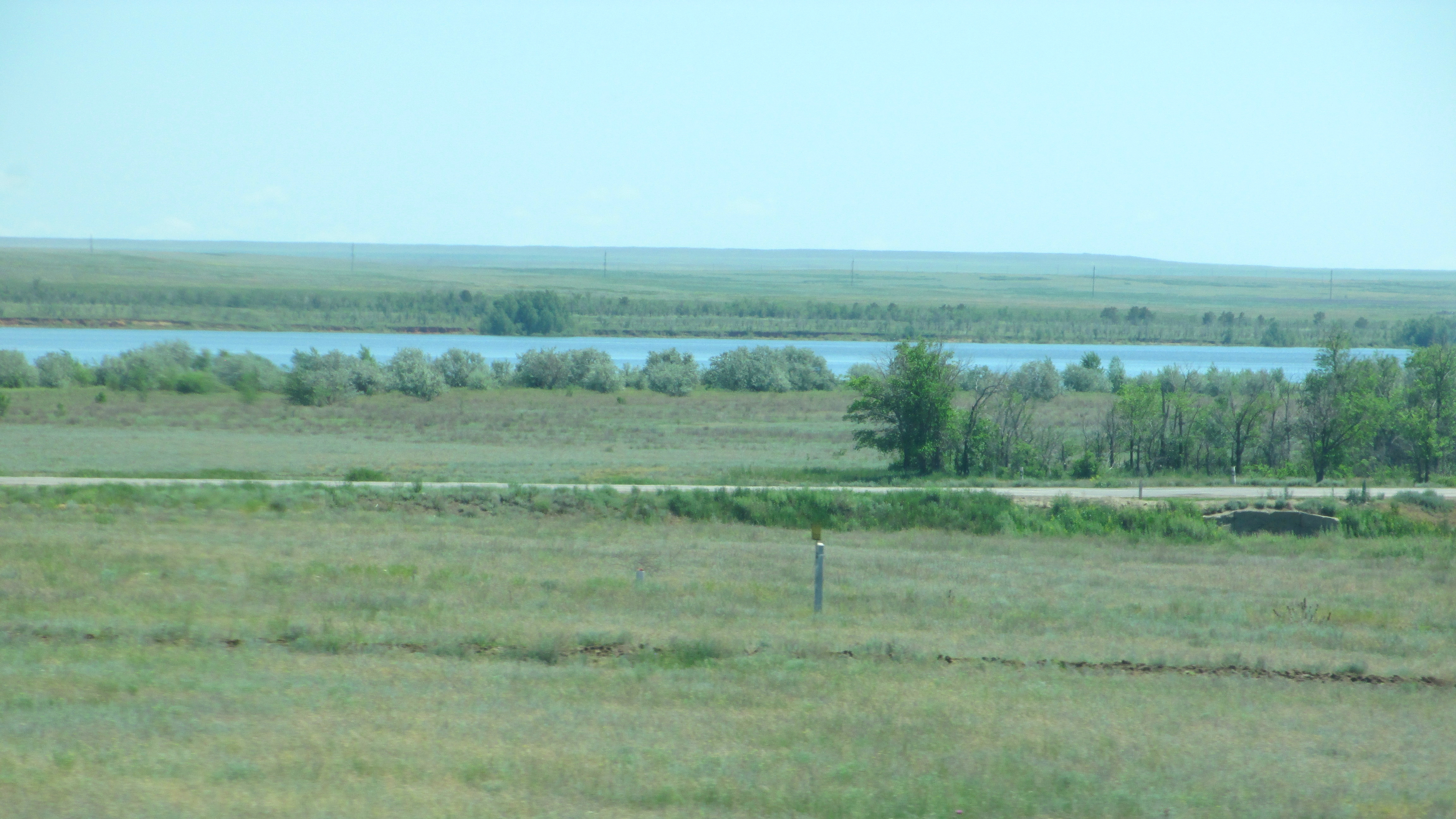
Modern day view of the Aktobe Region.

On April 12, a 7,000-strong corps under the command of Traubenberg set out from the Orsk Fortress (now part of Orenburg Oblast). Detachments from some other cities also set out, but were unsuccessful due to late response and lack of supplies. From April 15 to 18, the Kalmyks passed the Mugodzhar Mountains (now Aktobe Region) and later crossed the Turgai River. Amidst that, General von Traubenberg decided to cease the pursuit of Ubashi and return to the Ust-Uysk Fortress a few days later, on May 13.

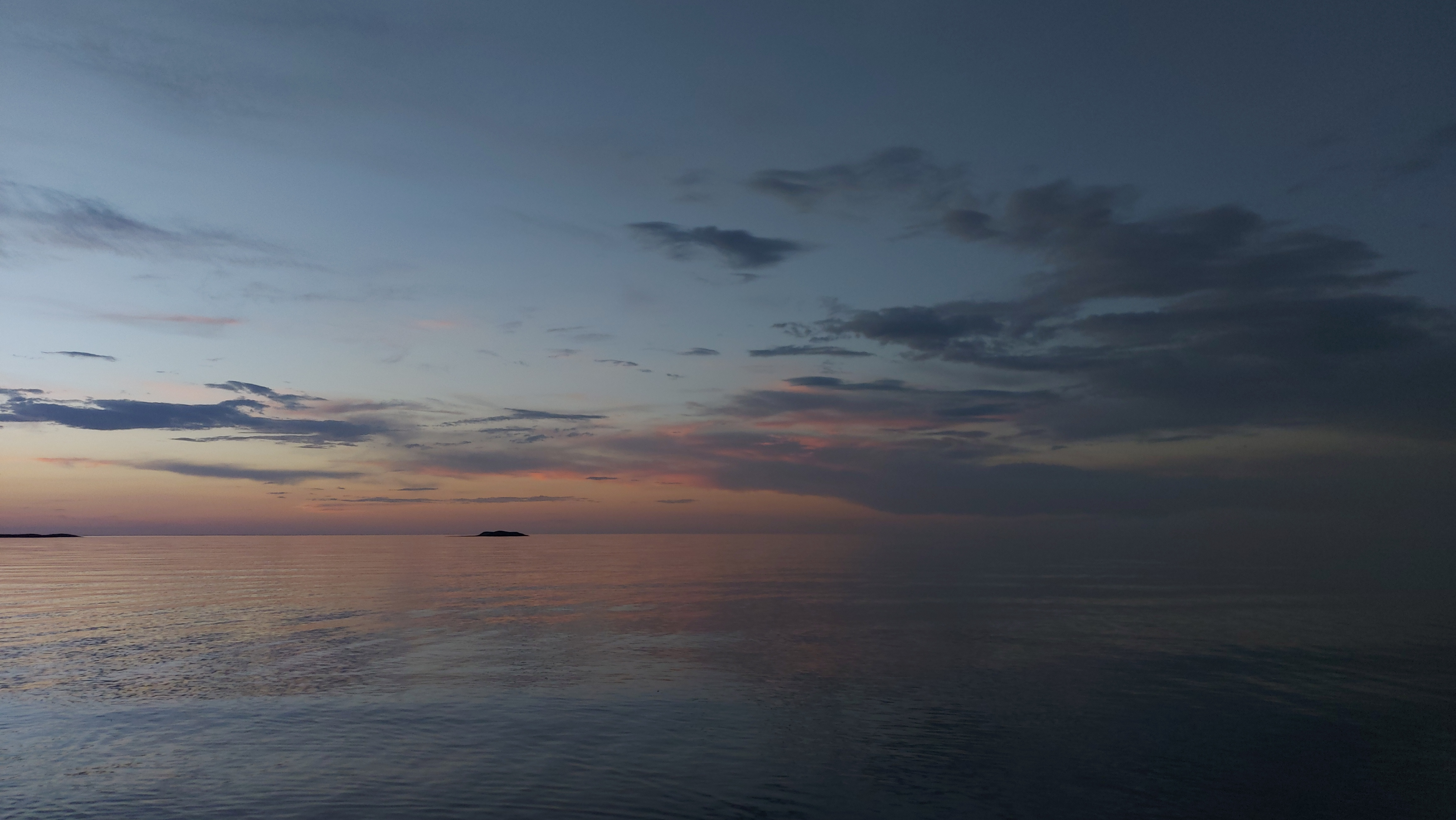
View of the Lake Balkhash. on Mynaral village.

In the Karaganda Region, the Kazakhs again attacked the Kalmyks. In the battle, the Kazakh militia of Ablai Khan numbered about 50,000 horsemen. Whether who won is unknown., as the Kalmyks began to bypass the Lake Balkhash from the north. In August, the Kalmyks reached the Chinese border on the Ili River. Ubashi's uluses were so weakened and exhausted that they could only await the mercy of the Chinese Emperor Qianlong. With that the Kalmyks were accepted as Chinese subjects on July 24.

== Aftermath on resettlement ==
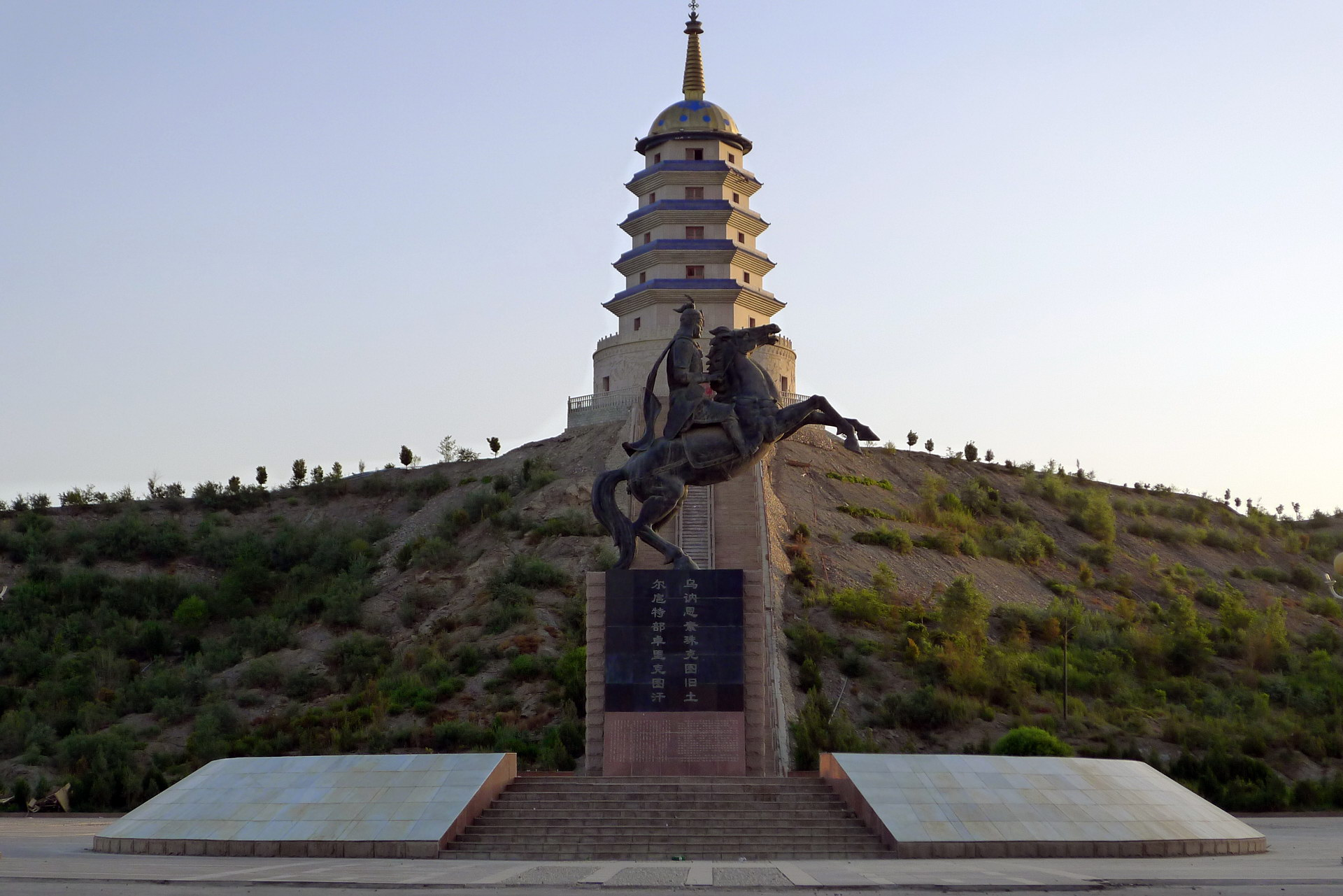
Monument to the return of the Torghuts in Korla, Xinjiang, PRC. Statue of Khan Ubashi in front.

The Qianlong Emperor was pleased with the Torghuts' migration, and claimed in a poem that all the Mongols had now become his vassals. Those Torghuts who had lived on the banks of the Volga since 1630 referred to the newcomers who had fled to them after the destruction of the Dzungar khanate as the New Torghuts. The Qing authorities had split them into New and Old Torghut banners, appointing jasaghs from among them after the precedent of the Mongol commanders. Ubashi obtained the honoured title of khan and was appointed the head of the League of the Ten Old Torghut Banners, while his subordinate chiefs received such honorary titles as "Qinnwang", "Junwang", "beile", "beise", "gong", first-class "tayiji".

However, Qianlong Emperor harbored great suspicion towards these Torgut people. He instructed Šuhede to ensure that the tribes of the seven Torghut leaders were settled in different regions and to prohibit them from exchanging messages with each other, so that Xinjiang could enjoy long-term stability. Qianlong Emperor especially emphasized that the tribes led by Ubashi, Tsëbegdorji, Šereng must be settled in places far apart from each other.

Ultimately, Qianlong Emperor decided to divide the Torghuts into five groups. The Torghuts led by Ubashi were called the "Old Torghuts" (Хуучин Торгууд). They were divided into four groups (four leagues) and settled in Hoboksari, Bayanbulak Grassland (in present-day Hejing County), Jing (in present-day Jinghe County), and Kara Usu (in present-day Wusu County), which known as Ili Northern Route, Southern Route, Western Route and Eastern Route respectively. Old Torghuts were managed and supervised by four officials under the Ili General. The Torghuts led by Šereng were known as the "New Torguts" (Шинэ Торгууд). They were settled near the Bulgan River, and managed and monitored by officials under the Uliastai General.

The Torghuts were coerced by the Qing into giving up their nomadic lifestyle and to take up sedentary agriculture instead as part of a deliberate policy by the Qing to enfeeble them. They proved to be incompetent farmers and they became destitute, selling their children into slavery, engaging in prostitution, and stealing, according to the Manchu traveler Qi-yi-shi. Child slaves were in demand on the Central Asian slave market, and Torghut children were sold into this slave trade.

Banners of Old Torghut and New Torghut
Banner	Established	First ruler	Title granted by Qing court	Notes
Ili Southern Route Old Torghut Banner (Jorigtü Khan Banner)	1771	Ubaši	Jasagh, "Jorigtü" khan	Old Torghut
Ili Southern Route Old Torghut Middle Banner	1771	Emegen Ubaši	Jasagh, "Bayar" beis	Old Torghut
Ili Southern Route Old Torghut Right Banner	1771	Bayijiqu	Jasagh, Tusalagchi Gong	Old Torghut
Ili Southern Route Old Torghut Left Banner	1771	Ber Qašiq-a	Jasagh, First Rank Taiji	Old Torghut
Ili Northern Route Old Torghut Banner	1771	Tsëbegdorji	Jasagh, "Buyantu" Chin Wang	Old Torghut
Ili Northern Route Old Torghut Right Banner	1771	Kirib	Jasagh, First Rank Taiji	Old Torghut. Merged into Ili Northern Route Old Torghut Right Banner in 1779. Re-established in 1785.
Ili Northern Route Old Torghut Left Banner	1785	Aγsaqal	Jasagh, Tusalagchi Gong	Old Torghut.
Ili Eastern Route Old Torghut Right Banner	1771	Bambar	Jasagh, "Bisireltu" Giyün Wang	Old Torghut
Ili Eastern Route Old Torghut Left Banner	1771	Čebten	Jasagh, "Itegel" Beis	Old Torghut
Ili Western Route Old Torghut Banner	1771	Momontu	Jasagh, "Jargalang" Beile	Old Torghut
Jargalang Torghut Right Banner	1771	Šereng	Jasagh, "Biligtü" Giyün Wang	New Torghut
Jargalang Torghut Left Banner	1771	Šar-a Köken	Jasagh, "Učaraltu" Beis	New Torghut

== In political propaganda ==
In contemporary Chinese political propaganda, the Torghut migration is portrayed as a heroic act of returning to their homeland of China after suffering national oppression from Russia Empire, a feat of "hearts turned towards the motherland, returning eastward thousands of miles away". In 1993, China aired the historical television series Heroes Returning to the East (东归英雄传), which told this story.

== Sources ==
- Clarke, Michael Edmund (2004). In the Eye of Power: China and Xinjiang from the Qing Conquest to the 'New Great Game' for Central Asia, 1759–2004 (PDF) (PhD). Brisbane, Queensland: Dept. of International Business & Asian Studies, Griffith University. Archived from the original (PDF) on 10 April 2008.
- Perdue, Peter C. (30 June 2009). China Marches West: The Qing Conquest of Central Eurasia. Harvard University Press. ISBN 9780674042025.
