= Sayramsu =

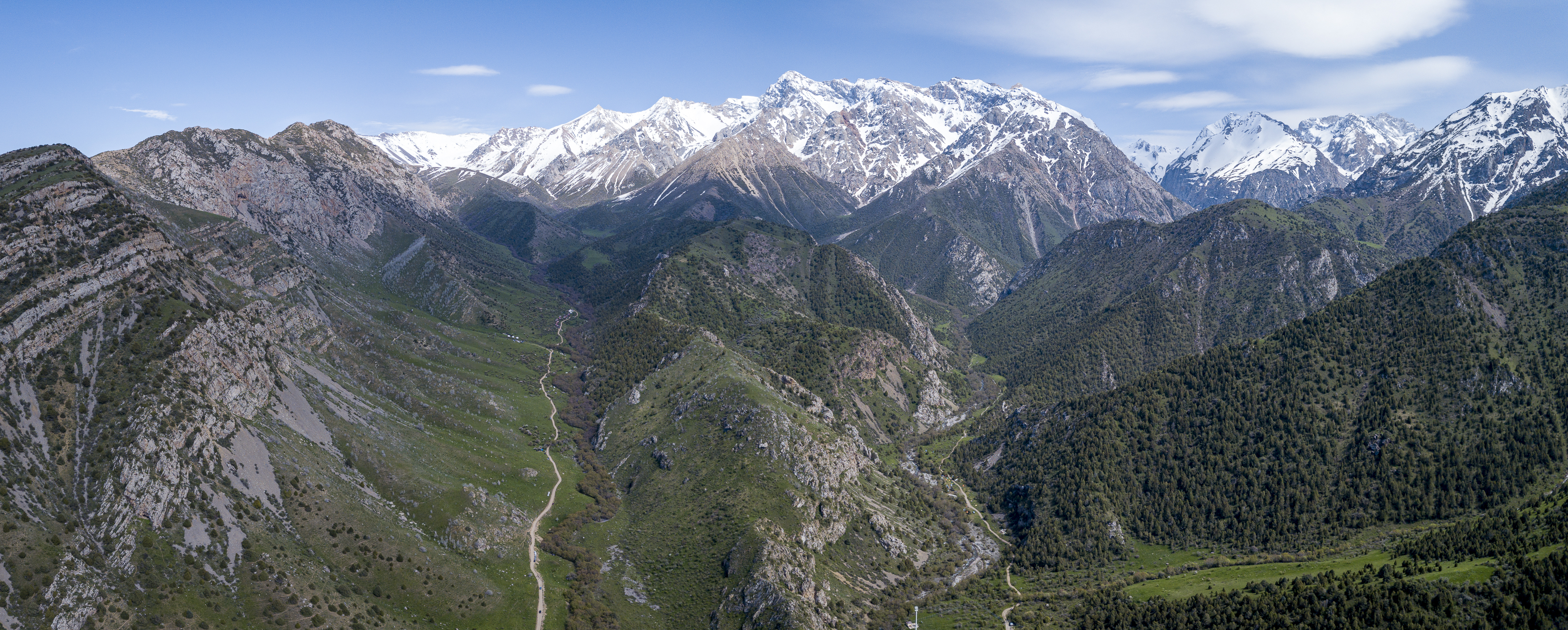

- Mouth location in Kazakhstan
- Native name: Сайрамсу (Kazakh)

Location
- Country: Kazakhstan
- Region: Turkistan
- District: Tole Bi, Sayram

Physical characteristics
- Source
  - location: Ugam Range
  - coordinates: 42.200145°N 70.387681°E
  - elevation: c. 1,655 m (5,430 ft)
- Mouth
  - location: Badam
  - coordinates: 42.2658°N 69.6871°E
  - elevation: c. 569 m (1,867 ft)
- Length: 76 km (47 mi)
- Basin size: 1,060 km^{2} (410 sq mi)

Basin features
- Progression: Badam→ Arys→ Syr Darya→ North Aral Sea

The Sayramsu (Kazakh: Сайрамсу) is a river in southern Kazakhstan. It is a tributary of the Badam River near Shymkent.

== See also ==
- List of rivers of Kazakhstan
