= Sub-Ural Plateau =

Mountainous plateau in west Kazakhstan

Coordinates: 49°N 56°E

The Sub-Ural Plateau (Russian: Подуральское плато, romanized: Poduralskoe Plato) is a low-elevation mountainous plateau mostly in west Kazakhstan and some northern parts are in Russia. It is also known as the Cis-Ural Plateau (Russian: Предуральское плато, romanized: Preduralskoe Plato). Its southern part is known as the Emba Plateau (Russian: Эмбинское плато, romanized: Embinskoe Plato), after the Emba River that flows across it.

In Kazakhstan, the majority of the plateau is within the Aktobe Region, with small northwester part in the West Kazakhstan Region. In Russia, a small northern part is within the Orenburg Oblast.

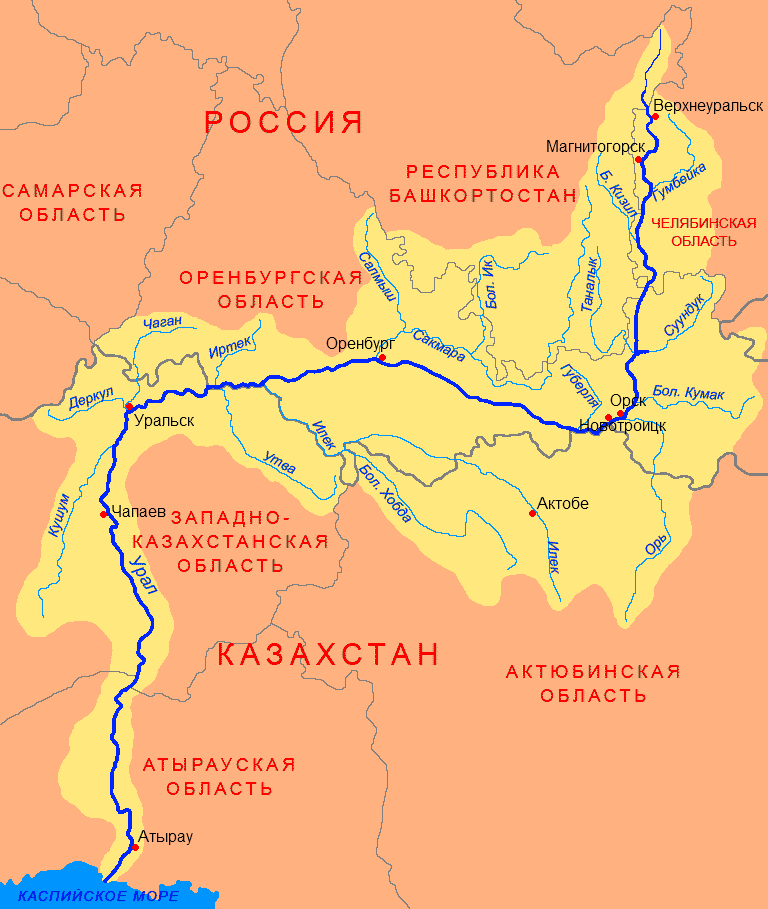
Ural River basin

The plateau is a gently sloping flatland with elevations ranging from 450m in the northeast and 100m in the southwest. It merges into the Caspian Depression in the southwest and merges with the Mugalzhar Range (southern continuation of the Ural Mountains) in the east. Its natural northern boundary is the valley of the east–west stretch of the Ural River.

The northern part is dissected by deep valleys and ravines, in the south the watersheds are more flat and the network of ravines is less dense. In terms of vegetation the plateau is split between Eurasian steppe zone and Gobi-type desert zone. The watersheds near the Mugalzhar feature buttes (steep-sided flat-topped isolated hills), indicative of the elevations before the area was washed out.

Rivers Emba and Ilek flow across it and rivers Khobda, Uil, Saghyz and Temir have sources there.

The western part of the plateau between the Or-Ilek highland and Khobda river, centered in the city of Aktobe is commonly known as the Aktobe Sub-Urals (Russian: Aktobinskoye priuralye) and the part south of it, adjacent to the Mugalzhar Range and bounded by the Temir River, is known as the Cis-Mugalzhars (Russian: Predmugalzharye).
