= Yuzhnouralsk =

Yuzhnouralsk Южноуральск
- Town
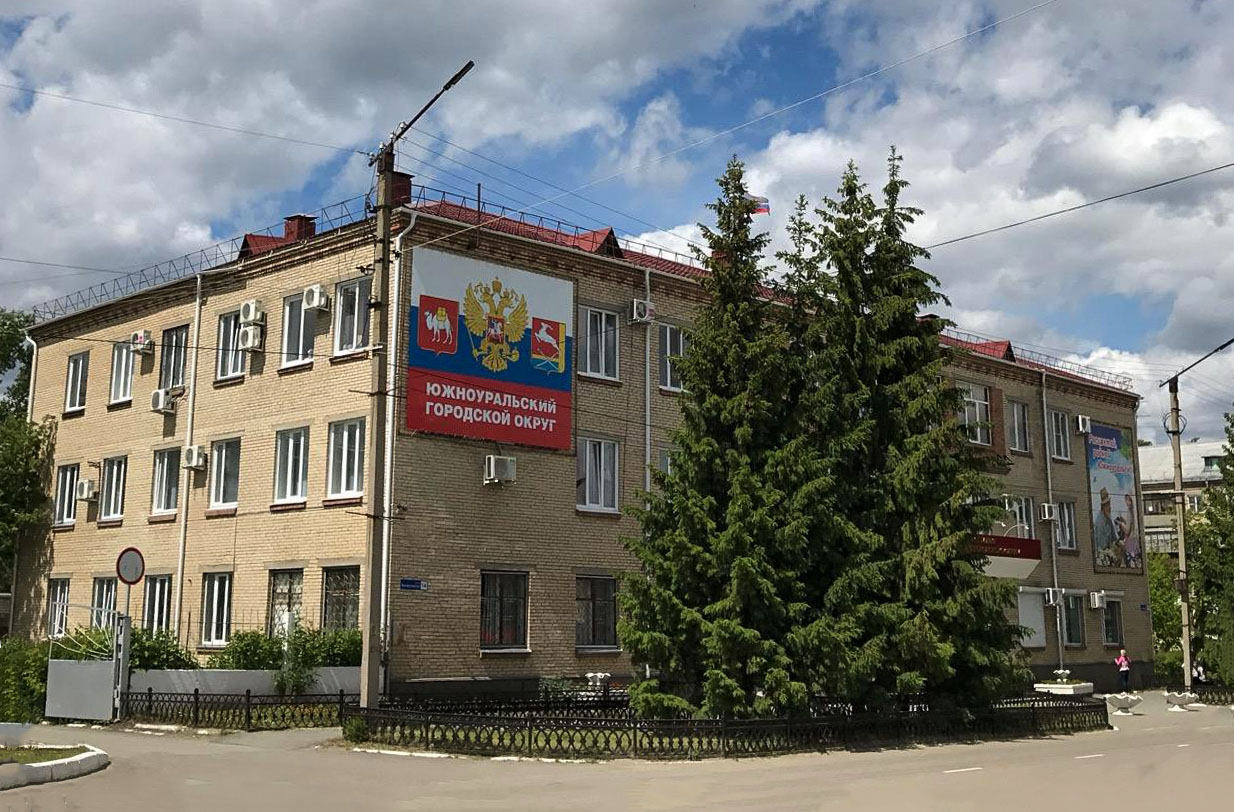
- Administration building in Yuzhnouralsk

- Flag Coat of arms
- Interactive map of Yuzhnouralsk
- Location of Yuzhnouralsk Yuzhnouralsk (Chelyabinsk Oblast)
- Coordinates: 54°27′N 61°15′E
- Country: Russia
- Federal subject: Chelyabinsk Oblast
- Founded: 1948
- Town status since: February 1, 1963

Area
  - Total: 110.57 km^{2} (42.69 sq mi)
- Elevation: 238 m (781 ft)

Population (2010 Census)
  - Total: 37,877
  - Estimate (2025): 36,964 (−2.4%)
  - Density: 342.56/km^{2} (887.23/sq mi)

Administrative status
  - Subordinated to: Town of Yuzhnouralsk
  - Capital of: Town of Yuzhnouralsk

Municipal status
  - Urban okrug: Yuzhnouralsky Urban Okrug
  - Capital of: Yuzhnouralsky Urban Okrug
- Time zone: UTC+5 (MSK+2)
- Postal codes: 457040 — 457044, 457059
- Dialing code: +7 35134
- OKTMO ID: 75764000001
- Website: u-uralsk.ru

Yuzhnouralsk (Russian: Южноура́льск) is a town in Chelyabinsk Oblast, Russia, located on the Uvelka River 88 kilometers (55 mi) south of Chelyabinsk. Population: 37,877 (2010 census); 39,275 (2002 census); 41,335 (1989 Soviet census).

== History ==
It was founded in 1948. Town status was granted to it on February 1, 1963.. It was one of the towns closest to the hypocenter of the blast from the 2013 Russian meteor event.

== Administrative and municipal status ==
Within the framework of administrative divisions, it is, together with one rural locality, incorporated as the Town of Yuzhnouralsk—an administrative unit with the status equal to that of the districts. As a municipal division, the Town of Yuzhnouralsk is incorporated as Yuzhnouralsky Urban Okrug.
