= Volzhsky, Volgograd Oblast =

City in Volgograd Oblast, Russia

Volzhsky Волжский
- City
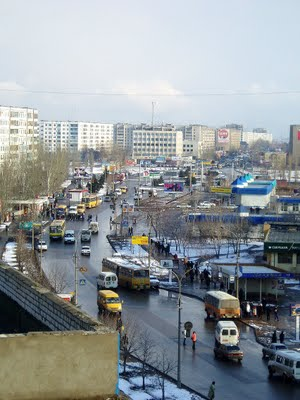

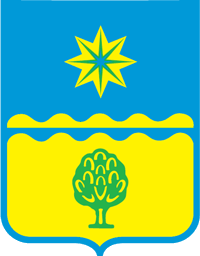
- Flag Coat of arms
- Interactive map of Volzhsky
- Location of Volzhsky Volzhsky (Volgograd Oblast)
- Coordinates: 48°48′20″N 44°44′30″E
- Country: Russia
- Federal subject: Volgograd Oblast
- Founded: 1951
- City status since: 1954

Government
  - Head: Igor Voronin
- Elevation: 20 m (66 ft)

Population (2010 Census)
  - Total: 314,255
  - Estimate (2025): 313,034 (−0.4%)
  - Rank: 58th in 2010

Administrative status
  - Subordinated to: city of oblast significance of Volzhsky
  - Capital of: city of oblast significance of Volzhsky

Municipal status
  - Urban okrug: Volzhsky Urban Okrug
  - Capital of: Volzhsky Urban Okrug
- Time zone: UTC+3 (MSK)
- Postal code: 404100..404133
- Dialing code: +7 8443
- OKTMO ID: 18710000001

Volzhsky (Russian: Волжский, IPA: [ˈvoɫʂskʲɪɪ̯]) is an industrial city in Volgograd Oblast, Russia, located on the east bank of the Volga River and its distributary the Akhtuba, 20 kilometers (12 mi) northeast of Volgograd. It is the second-largest city in Volgograd Oblast, after Volgograd. Population: 321,427 (2021 census); 314,255 (2010 census); 313,169 (2002 census); 268,842 (1989 Soviet census).

Historical population
Year	Pop.	±%
1959	66,965	—
1970	142,058	+112.1%
1979	209,150	+47.2%
1989	268,842	+28.5%
2002	313,169	+16.5%
2010	314,255	+0.3%
2021	321,479	+2.3%
Source: Census data

== History ==
Volzhsky was founded in 1951. It had a population of about 10,000 at that time. On July 22, 1954, by Decree of the Presidium of the Supreme Soviet of the RSFSR, the village of Volzhsky became the city of Volzhsky, in connection with the construction of the Stalingrad HPP (1950-1961).

Volzhsky grew around a hydroelectric power station which was built by Komsomol volunteers and by civil convict labor, who numbered almost 27,000 by 1953.

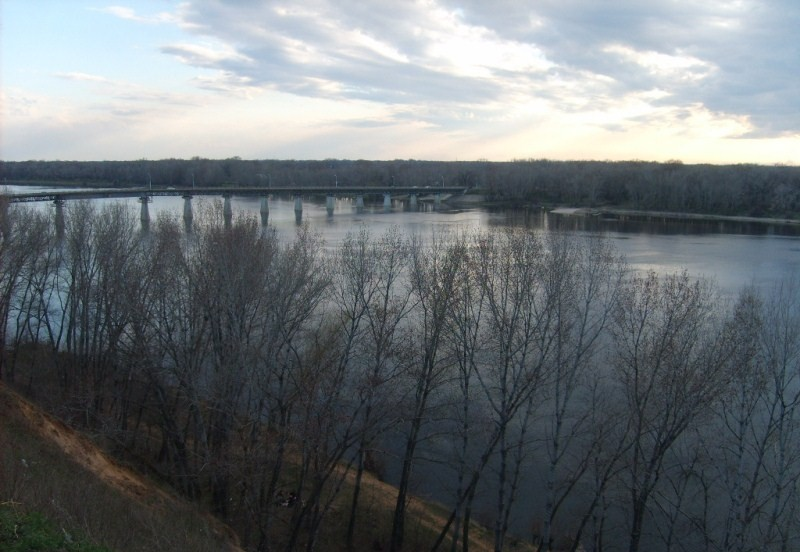
Akhtuba River near the village of Srednyaya Akhtuba, 3 km from Volzhsky

In April 2012, the work settlement of Krasnooktyabrsky, administratively subordinated to Volzhsky, and the rural locality (a settlement) of Uralsky from Sredneakhtubinsky District were merged into Volzhsky.

== Administrative and municipal status ==
Within the framework of administrative divisions, it is incorporated as the city of oblast significance of Volzhsky—an administrative unit with the status equal to that of the districts. As a municipal division, the city of oblast significance of Volzhsky is incorporated as Volzhsky Urban Okrug.

== Economy ==
The city is the site of the Volga Hydroelectric Station.

== Twin towns – sister cities ==
Volzhsky is twinned with:

- Cleveland Heights, United States
- (Germany) Mönchengladbach, Nord-Rhein Westfalia, Deutschland
- Collegno, Italy
- Lianyungang, China
- Shaker Heights, United States
