= Lukina =

Location
- Country: Kazakhstan

Physical characteristics
- Mouth: Aksu
  - coordinates: 49.3875°N 85.6152°E

Basin features
- Progression: Aksu→ Bukhtarma→ Irtysh→ Ob→ Kara Sea

The Lukina (Russian: Лукина) is a river of northeastern Kazakhstan. It discharges into the Aksu (Russian: Belaya), a tributary of the Bukhtarma.
