= Sabyrzhylga =

River in Kazakhstan

Sabyrzhylga Сабыржылға
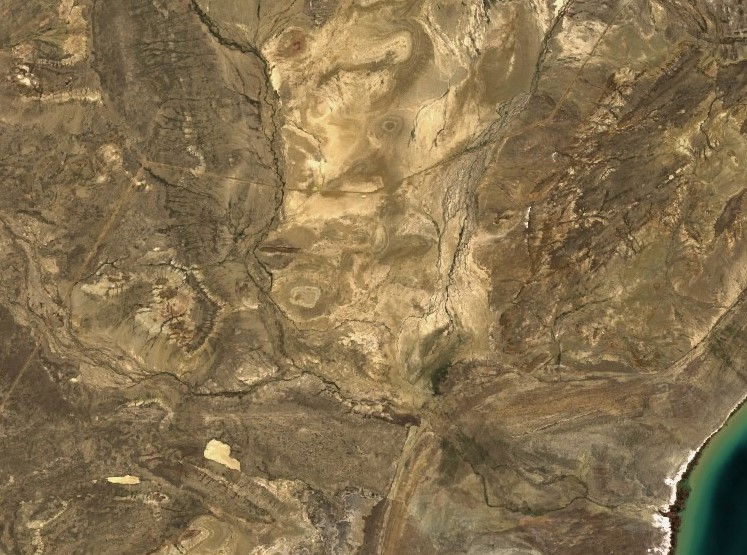
- Lower stretch of river Sabyrzhylga Sentinel-2 image.

- Mouth location in Kazakhstan

Location
- Countries: Kazakhstan

Physical characteristics
- Source
  - elevation: 65 m (213 ft)
- Mouth: 8 km (5.0 mi) west of the North Aral Sea
  - coordinates: 46°34′54″N 59°54′36″E
  - elevation: 48 m (157 ft)
- Length: 72 km (45 mi)
- Basin size: 1,250 km^{2} (480 sq mi)

The Sabyrzhylga (Kazakh: Сабыржылға) is a river in Shalkar District, Aktobe Region and Aral District, Kyzylorda Region, Kazakhstan. It is 72 kilometres (45 mi) long and has a catchment area of 1,250 square kilometres (480 sq mi).

The river flows across uninhabited areas. Its basin is used for grazing of local cattle in the spring.

== Course ==
The Sabyrzhylga is part of the Aral Basin. It has its sources in a spring located in an elevation to the east of the southeastern edge of the Greater Barsuki desert, northwest of the Aral Sea. It heads first roughly southwestwards and then southwards. In its final stretch it bends southeastwards and its waters disperse in the semidesert sands before reaching the northwestern shore of the Shevchenko Bay in the North Aral Sea.

The Sabyrzhylga flows only in the spring, following the melting of the snows. Most of the river channel is not very conspicuous and its final alluvial fan is barely distinguishable.

== See also ==
- List of rivers of Kazakhstan
