= Boralday (river) =

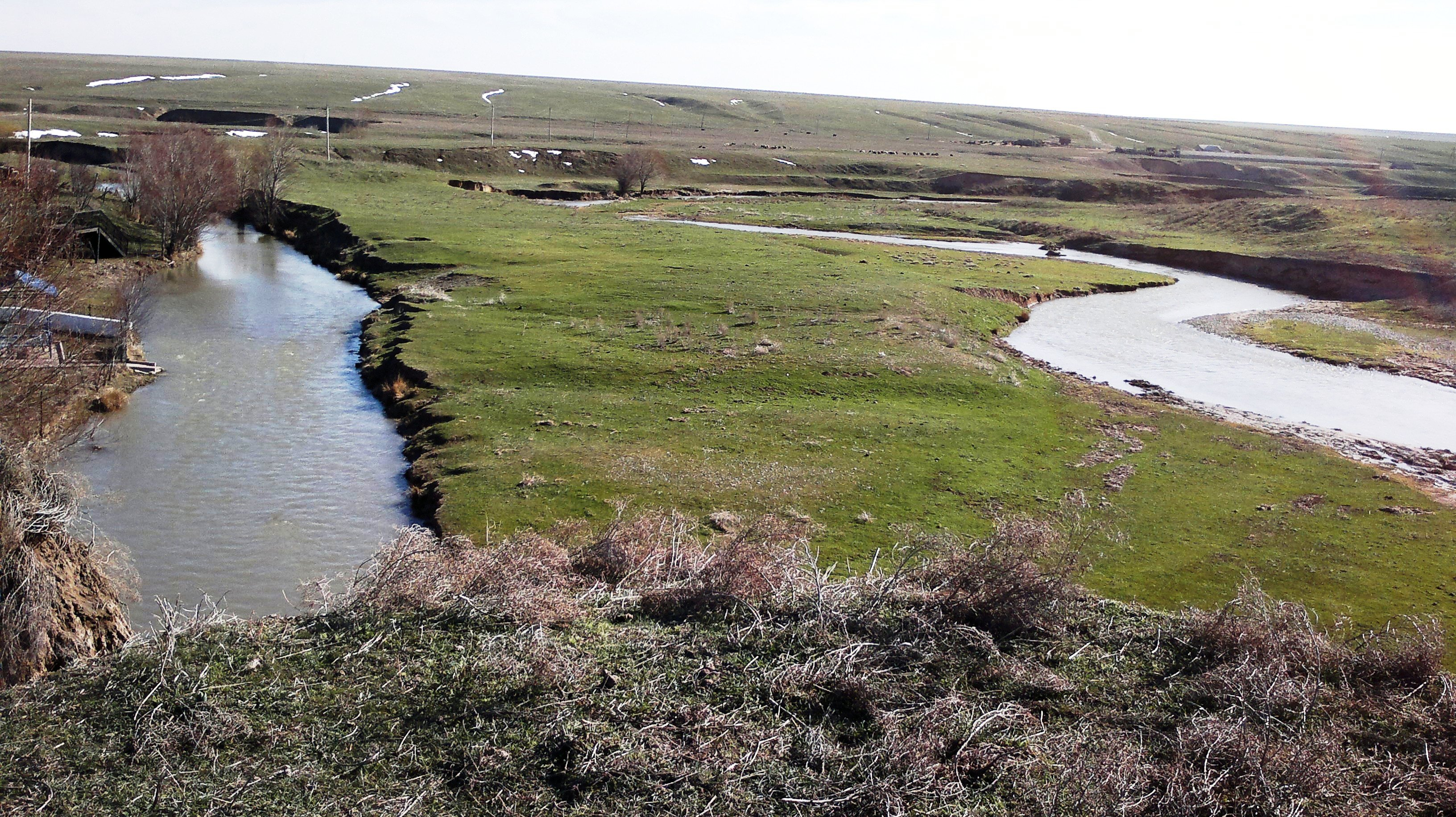
- The Boralday river in Baydibek District

- Mouth location in Kazakhstan

Location
- Country: Kazakhstan

Physical characteristics
- Mouth: Arys
  - coordinates: 42.5953°N 69.3455°E

Basin features
- Progression: Arys→ Syr Darya→ North Aral Sea

The Boralday (Kazakh: Боралдай, Boraldai) is a river of southern Kazakhstan. It is a right tributary of the Arys, of the Syr Darya basin.

== See also ==
- List of rivers of Kazakhstan
