= Kigach =

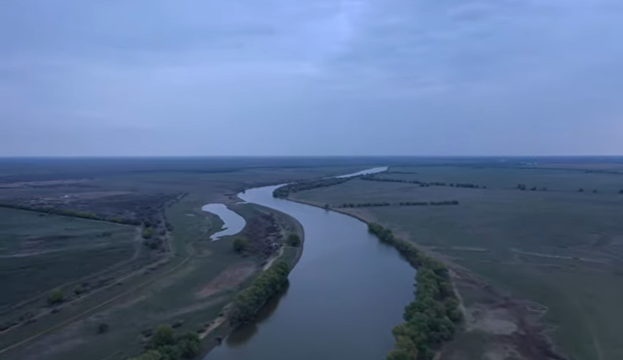

Location
- Country: Kazakhstan

Physical characteristics
- Source: Akhtuba
  - coordinates: 46.6078°N 48.2608°E
- Mouth: Shirokaya
  - coordinates: 46.4719°N 48.8208°E
- Length: 378 km (235 mi)
- Basin size: 14,900 km^{2} (5,800 sq mi)

Basin features
- Progression: Shirokaya→ Caspian Sea

The Kigach (Russian: Кигач, Kazakh: Қиғаш, Qiğaş) is a river of southern Russia (Astrakhan Oblast) and Kazakhstan (Atyrau Region). A left distributary of the Akhtuba, it is part of the Volga Delta.
