= Uil =

Uil Ойыл
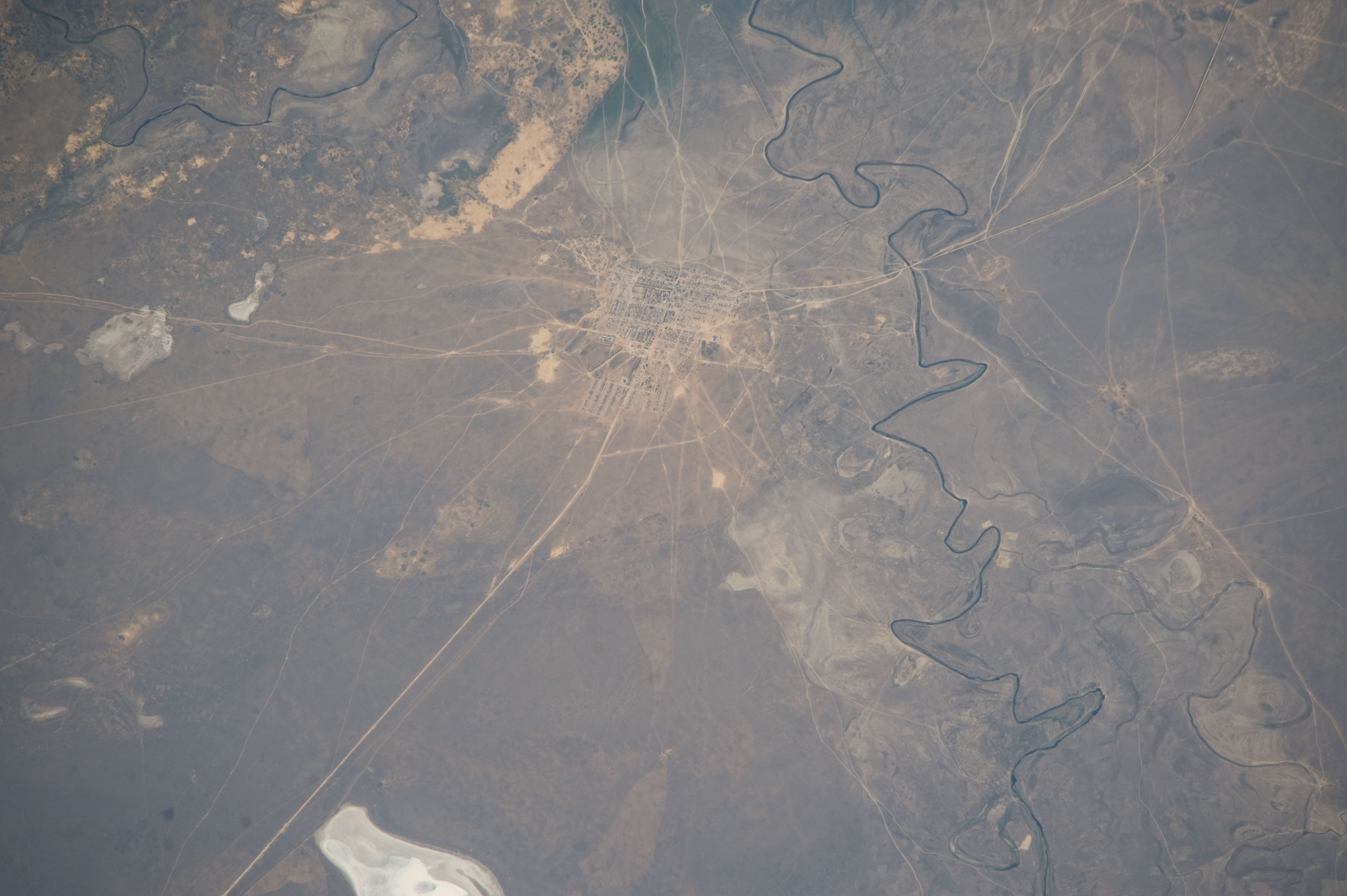

- Mouth location in Kazakhstan

Location
- Country: Kazakhstan

Physical characteristics
- Source: Sub-Ural Plateau
  - coordinates: 49°32′N 56°48′E
- Mouth: Aktobe
  - coordinates: 48.5410°N 52.4041°E
- Length: 800 km (500 mi)
- Basin size: 31,500 km^{2} (12,200 sq mi)

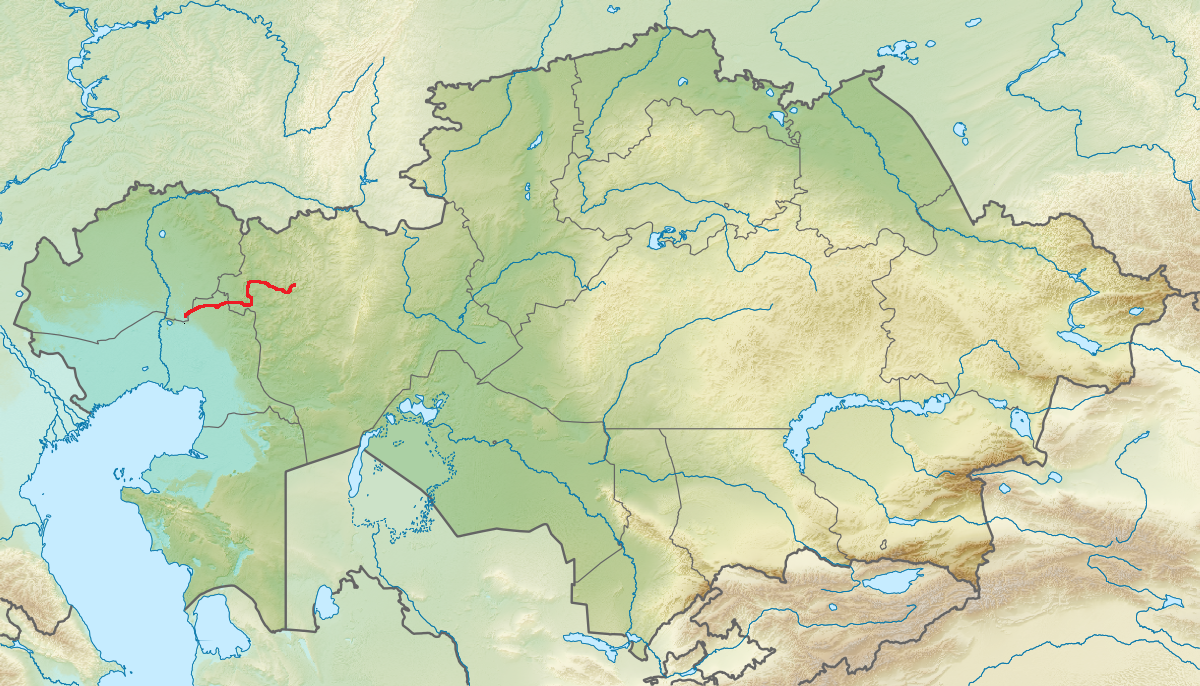

The Uil (Kazakh: Ойыл, romanized: Oyıl; Russian: Уил, romanized: Uil) is a river of Aktobe, Atyrau and West Kazakhstan regions, Kazakhstan. It is 800 kilometres (500 mi) long, and has a drainage basin of 31,500 square kilometres (12,200 sq mi).

== Course ==
It has its sources in the Mugodzhar Hills and has many tributaries. Finally it discharges into lake Aktobe in the Caspian Depression.

== See also ==
- List of rivers of Kazakhstan
