= Syntasty =

Location
- Country: Kazakhstan, Russia

Physical characteristics
- Mouth: Tobol
  - coordinates: 52.2631°N 61.5636°E
- Length: 152 km (94 mi)
- Basin size: 510 km^{2} (200 sq mi)

Basin features
- Progression: Tobol→ Irtysh→ Ob→ Kara Sea

The Syntasty (Kazakh: Сынтасты, Syntasty; Russian: Синташта, Sintashta), in its lower course Zhelkuar (Russian: Желкуар), is a river of Kazakhstan (Kostanay Region) and Russia (Chelyabinsk Oblast). It is a left tributary of the Tobol. It has a length of 152 km (94 mi), and a catchment area of 5,100 km^{2} (2,000 sq mi).
