= Uzen =

Uzen can refer to:

- Uzen Province, Japan
- Uzen, Kazakhstan
- Bolshoy Uzen River
- Maly Uzen River
