= Mashat =

Location
- Country: Kazakhstan

Physical characteristics
- Mouth: Arys
  - coordinates: 42.5821°N 69.8448°E

Basin features
- Progression: Arys→ Syr Darya→ North Aral Sea

The Mashat (Kazakh: Машат, Maşat) is a river of southern Kazakhstan. It is a left tributary of the Arys.

A memorandum of cooperation for the construction of two hydroelectric power plants to be built on the Masha River in the Tulkibas District were signed with the Turkish company Endustriyel Eletrik Elektronik.
