= Aschiagar River =

Aschiagar

Location
- Country: Kazakhstan
- Region: Mangystau
- District: Munaily

Physical characteristics
- Source: southern slopes of Karatau
  - coordinates: 43°43′1.96″N 51°36′45.86″E
- Mouth: Karagiye
  - location: northeast of Kuryk
  - coordinates: 43.2552°N 51.4921°E
- Length: 45 km (28 mi)
- Basin size: 15,000 km^{2} (5,800 mi^{2})

The Aschiagar (Kazakh: Ащыағар, romanized: Aşyağar) is a river of Mangystau Region of Kazakhstan and runs some 40 kilometres (25 mi) to the east of the city of Aktau.

The river is 150 kilometres (93 mi) long and drains a basin of about 15,000 square kilometres (5,800 mi^{2}). The source of the Aschiagara is located on the southern slopes of Karatau, north of the town of Kuryk. The width of the bed ranges from 10 to 50 metres (33 to 164 ft), and the depth is 1 to 4 metres (3 to 13 ft).

The average annual water flow at the mouth about 5 cubic metres per second (180 cu ft/s), and in April during snow melt there has been an increase in flood levels by 4 to 5 metres (13 to 16 ft) on average. The river freezes in mid-December and begins to thaw in early March.
