= Sagiz =

Sagiz Сағыз Сагиз ساعىز
- Location within Kazakhstan
- Coordinates: 48°14′11″N 54°52′55″E
- Country: Kazakhstan
- Region: Atyrau
- Elevation: 52 m (171 ft)
- Time zone: UTC+5 (West Kazakhstan Time)
  - Summer (DST): UTC+5 (West Kazakhstan Time)

Sagiz, also known as Saghyz, (Kazakh: Сағыз, Sağyz, ساعىز; Russian: Сагиз, Sagiz) is a town in Atyrau Region, west Kazakhstan, near the border with Aktobe Region. It lies at an altitude of 52 m (171 ft).

== Climate ==
Sagiz has a semi-arid climate (Köppen: BSk) with very cold winters and hot summers.

Climate data for Sagiz (1991–2020)
Month	Jan	Feb	Mar	Apr	May	Jun	Jul	Aug	Sep	Oct	Nov	Dec	Year
Mean daily maximum °C (°F)	−6.0 (21.2)	−4.8 (23.4)	4.1 (39.4)	17.2 (63.0)	25.0 (77.0)	31.3 (88.3)	33.5 (92.3)	32.1 (89.8)	24.5 (76.1)	15.2 (59.4)	3.6 (38.5)	−3.7 (25.3)	14.3 (57.7)
Daily mean °C (°F)	−10.0 (14.0)	−9.4 (15.1)	−1.0 (30.2)	10.2 (50.4)	17.7 (63.9)	23.7 (74.7)	26.0 (78.8)	24.2 (75.6)	16.5 (61.7)	7.9 (46.2)	−1.1 (30.0)	−7.5 (18.5)	8.1 (46.6)
Mean daily minimum °C (°F)	−13.6 (7.5)	−13.3 (8.1)	−5.1 (22.8)	4.0 (39.2)	10.6 (51.1)	15.9 (60.6)	18.4 (65.1)	16.1 (61.0)	8.9 (48.0)	1.8 (35.2)	−4.8 (23.4)	−11.0 (12.2)	2.3 (36.1)
Average precipitation mm (inches)	11.0 (0.43)	11.2 (0.44)	16.2 (0.64)	20.5 (0.81)	32.6 (1.28)	19.2 (0.76)	17.9 (0.70)	7.9 (0.31)	10.3 (0.41)	16.4 (0.65)	17.4 (0.69)	16.8 (0.66)	197.4 (7.77)
Average precipitation days (≥ 1.0 mm)	3.3	3.2	3.4	4.1	4.9	3.0	3.0	1.8	2.2	3.5	4.1	5.0	41.5
Source: NOAA
