= Ilek (river) =

River in Kazakhstan

Ilek Елек / Илек
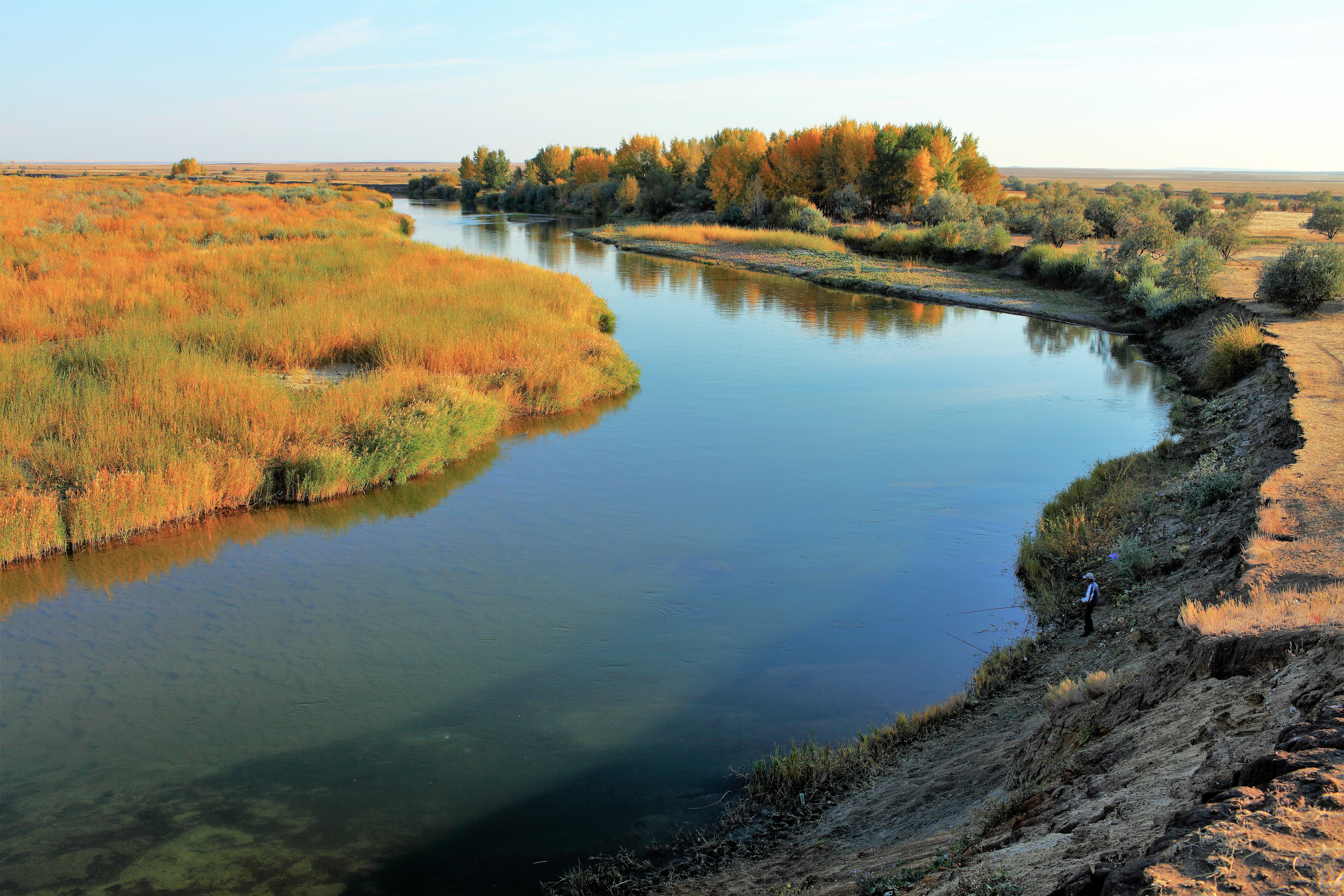

- Location within Kazakhstan

Physical characteristics
- Source: Mugalzhar
  - coordinates: 51.5097°N 53.3689°E
- Mouth: Ural

Basin features
- Progression: Ural→ Caspian Sea
- Tributaries
  - left: Khobda
  - right: Kargaly

The Ilek (Kazakh: Елек / Elek, IPA: [jeˈlʲek]; Russian: Илек, IPA: [ɪˈlʲek]) is a river in the Aktobe Region, Kazakhstan, and Orenburg Oblast, Russia. It is 149 kilometres (93 mi) long, and has a drainage basin of 13,700 square kilometres (5,300 sq mi).

The river basin is of archeological significance. There are burial sites of ancient Kurgan (Indo-European) cultures.

== Course ==
The Ilek is a left tributary of the Ural. It is a steppe river, flowing at the southern end of the Ural Mountains. It rises just south of Orsk, flows south a short distance and then flows westward south of and parallel to the river Ural, with many meanders and oxbow lakes, and joins the Ural about 75 kilometres (47 mi) west of Orenburg. Two main cities lie on the banks of the Ilek River: Sol-Iletsk and Aqtöbe (alternate spelling: Aktöbe, Aktyubinsk).

The Ilek remains the most polluted water body in the Ural-Caspian basin. The content of boron and chromium in the river is caused by the tailing ponds of former chemical plants via ground water. The pollution level varies from "polluted" to "very polluted". Tributaries of the Ilek include the Bolshaya Khobda and the Kargaly.

== Fauna ==
There are catfish, carp, perch, pike, etc. in the Ilek. Its water is supplied for use by industrial enterprises, and irrigation of agricultural lands.

== See also ==
- List of most-polluted rivers
- List of rivers of Kazakhstan
