= Ayat (river) =

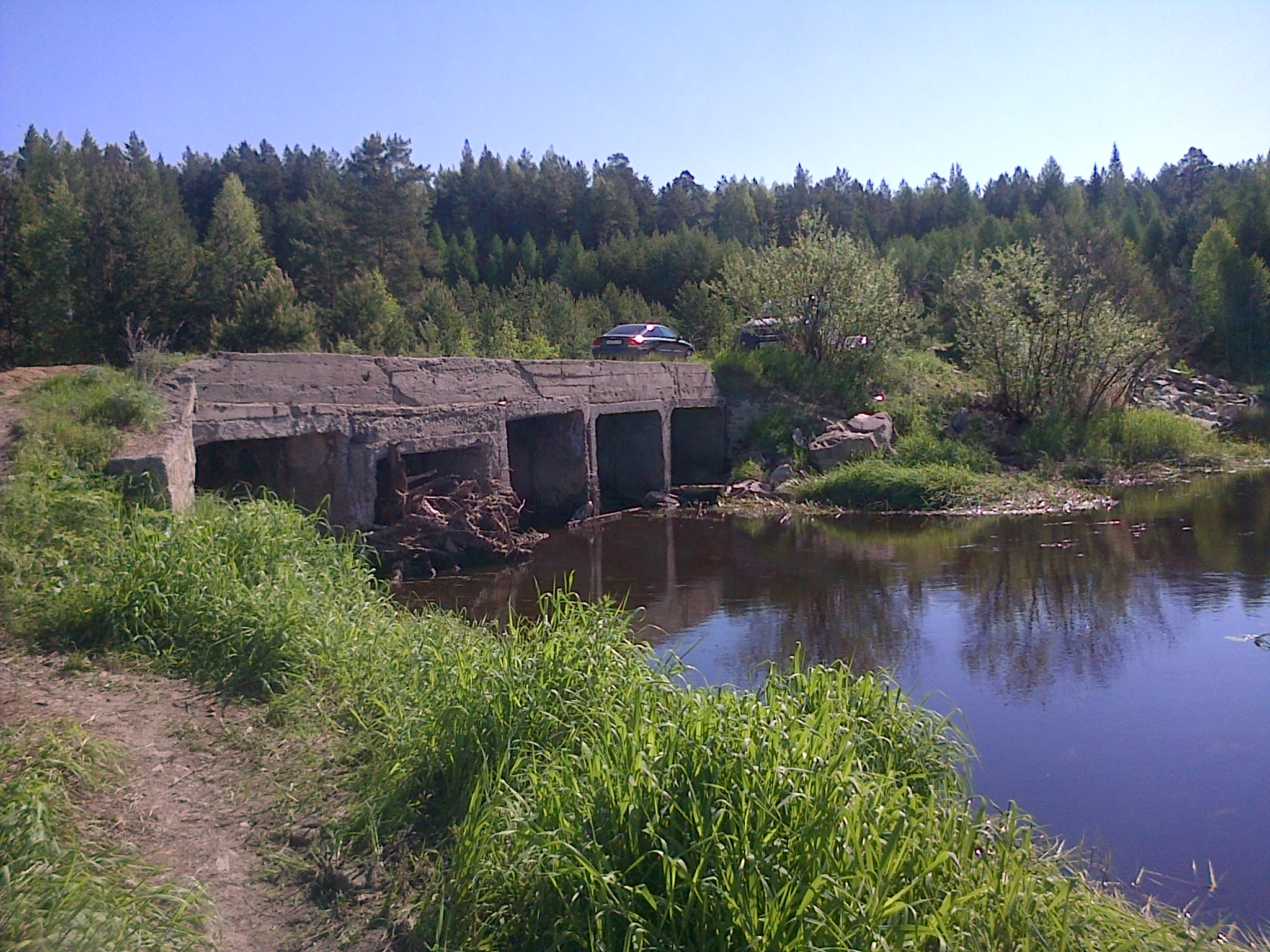

Location
- Country: Russia, Kazakhstan
- Region: Chelyabinsk Oblast, Kostanay Region

Physical characteristics
- Source: Confluence of rivers Karataly-Ayat and Archagly-Ayat
- Mouth: Karatomar reservoir
  - coordinates: 52.8774°N 62.8346°E
- Length: 117 km (73 mi)
- Basin size: 13,300 km^{2} (5,100 sq mi)

Basin features
- Progression: Tobol→ Irtysh→ Ob→ Kara Sea

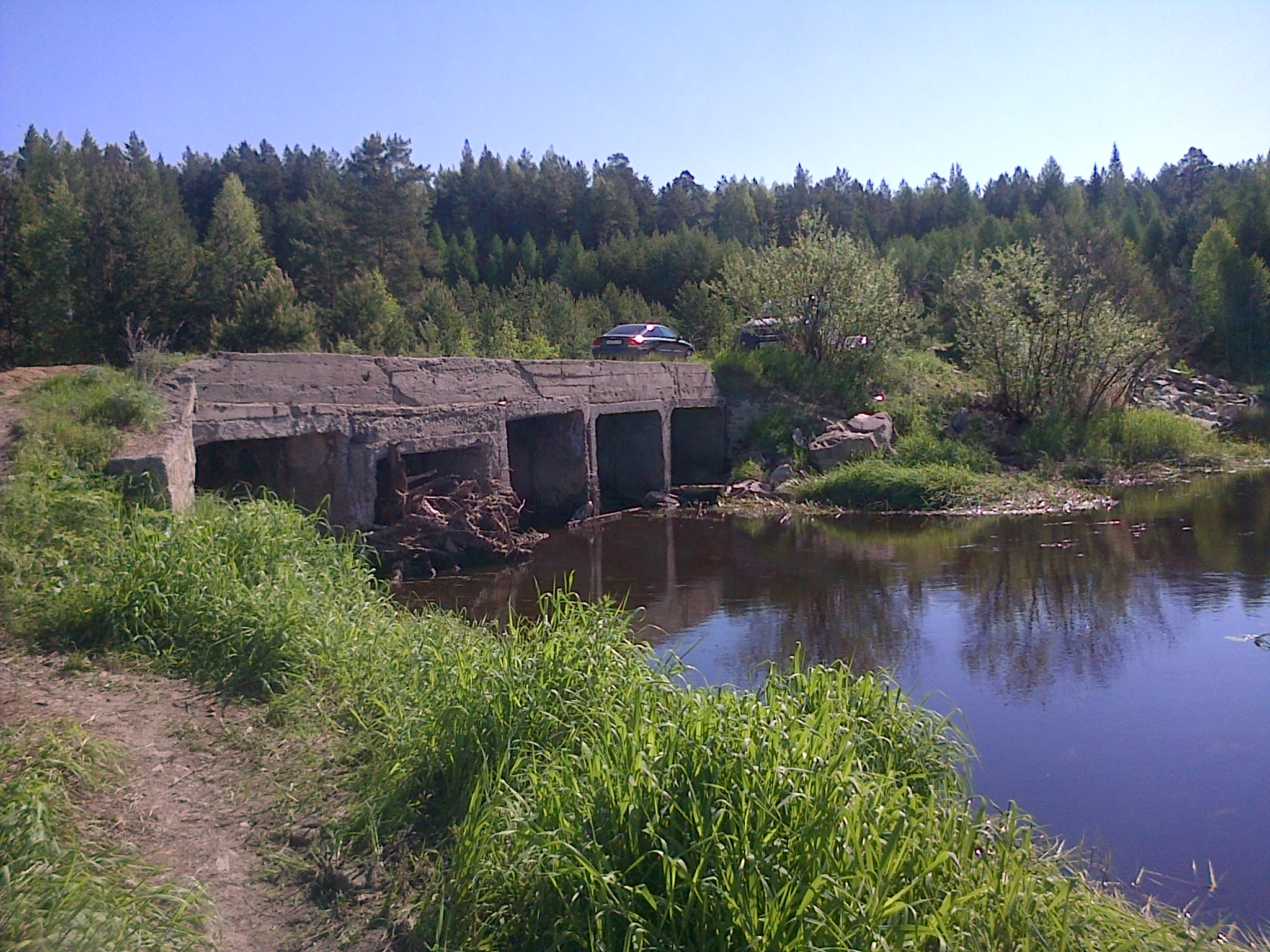
Bridge over the Ayat River.

The Ayat (Russian and Bashkir: Аят, Ayat; Kazakh: Аят: Aiat) is a river in Chelyabinsk Oblast, Russia and Kostanay Region, Kazakhstan. Ayat is formed by the confluence of Karataly-Ayat and Archagly-Ayat. The river flows into the Karatomar reservoir, which is drained by the river Tobol. The length of the river is 117 km, with a catchment area of 13,300 km².

== Hydrology ==
Much of the basin is formed by 383 drainless lakes (total area 208 km².). Russian part of the river has a length of 23 km and a watershed area of 8571 km².

The soils of the basin are mostly sandy and loam, occasionally salt. Laboissiere alluvial channels the channel is located in a well defined river valley.

In winter, the river often freezes to the bottom. Freezing was observed 5 times in past 43 years.

== In art ==
- "Tobol and Ayat" — a poem by Yevtushenko.
