= Badam (river) =

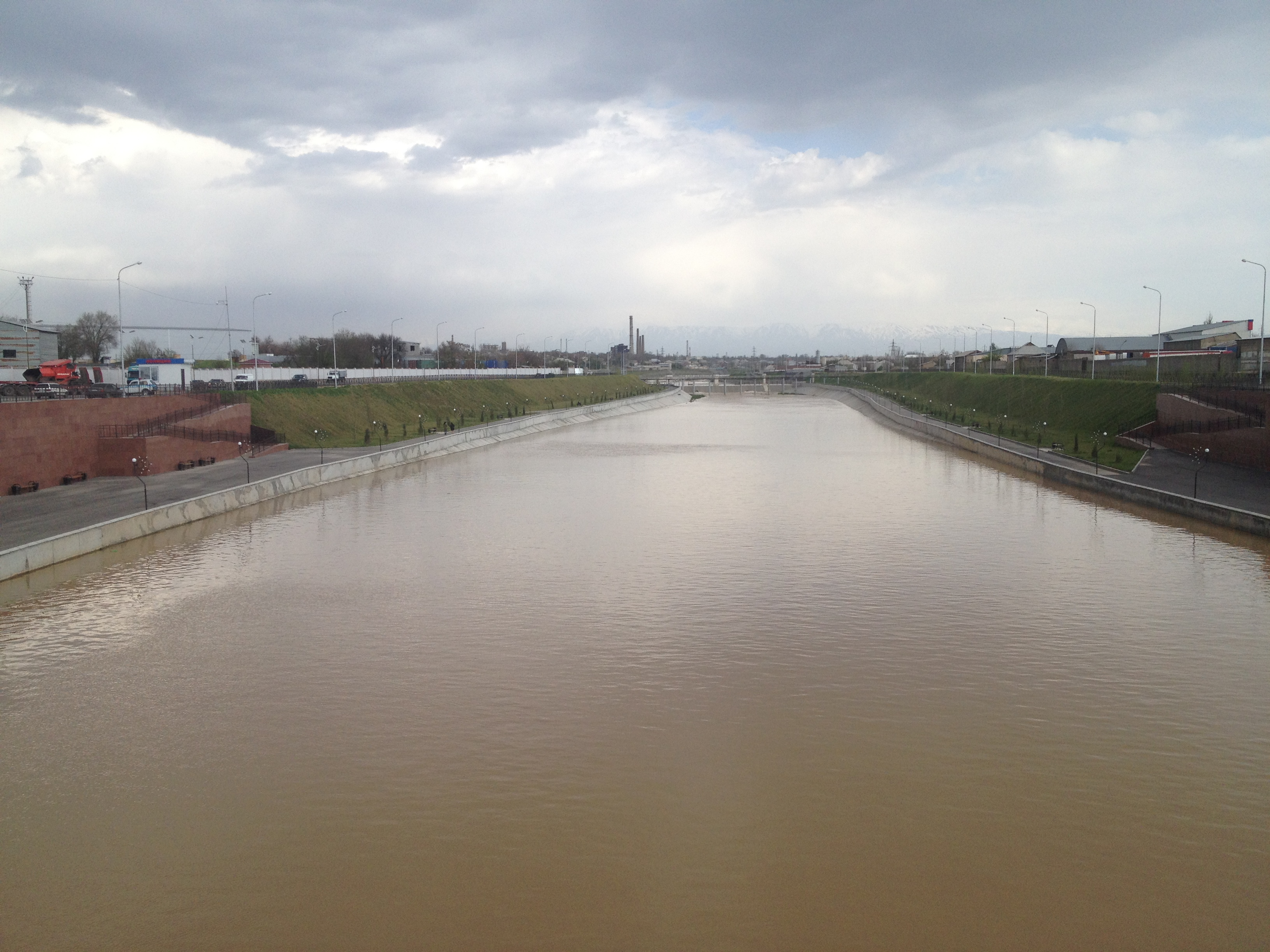
- The Badam in Shymkent

Location
- Country: Kazakhstan

Physical characteristics
- Mouth: Arys
  - coordinates: 42.5062°N 69.0472°E

Basin features
- Progression: Arys→ Syr Darya→ North Aral Sea

The Badam (Kazakh: Бадам, Badam) is a river of southern Kazakhstan. It is a left tributary of the Arys. It flows through the city Shymkent. One of its tributaries is the Sayramsu.
