= Saghyz (river) =

Location
- Country: Kazakhstan
- Region: Aktobe, Atyrau

Physical characteristics
- Source: Sub-Ural Plateau
- Mouth: Caspian Depression
  - coordinates: 47.5833°N 53.5000°E
- Length: 511 km (318 mi)
- Basin size: 19,400 km^{2} (7,500 sq mi)

The Saghyz (Kazakh: Сағыз, Sağyz, Russian: Сагиз, Sagiz) is a river of western Kazakhstan. It is 511 kilometres (318 mi) long, and has a drainage basin of 19,400 square kilometres (7,500 sq mi). It ends in a number of salt lakes in the Caspian Depression. The town Saghyz lies on its upper course.
