= Kargaly (river) =

Kargaly Қарғалы / Каргалы
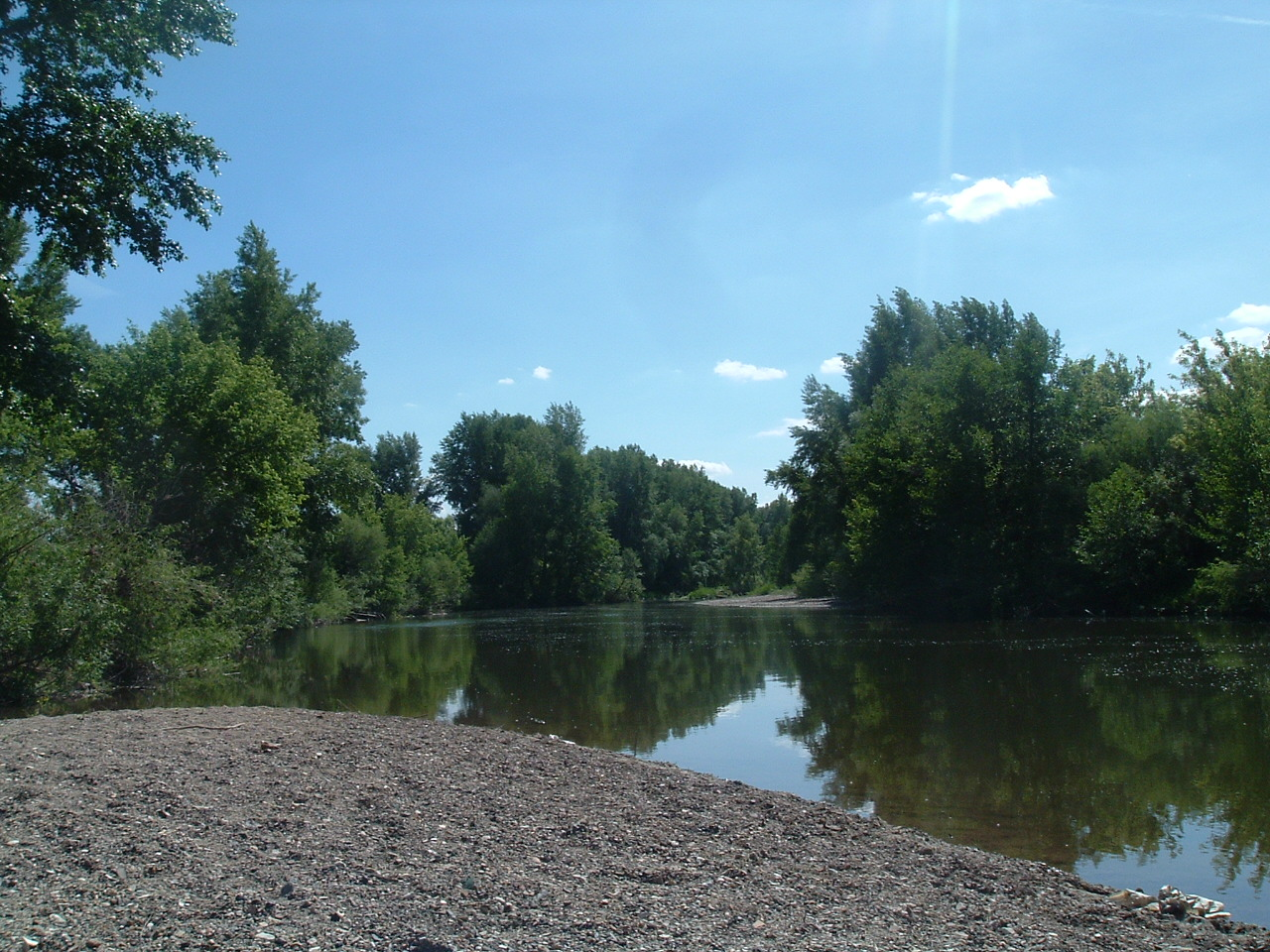

- Mouth location in Kazakhstan

Location
- Country: Kazakhstan

Physical characteristics
- Mouth: Ilek
  - location: Aktobe
  - coordinates: 50°18′22″N 57°13′50″E
- Length: 114 km (71 mi)
- Basin size: 5,130 km^{2} (1,980 sq mi)

Basin features
- Progression: Ural→ Caspian Sea

The Kargaly (Kazakh: Қарғалы) is a river of the Aktobe Region, in western Kazakhstan. It flows into the Ilek, a tributary of the Ural River, near the city of Aktobe.

== Geography ==
The Kargaly flows through the Alga District in the Aktobe Region, Kazakhstan. It is 114 kilometres long and has a drainage basin of 5,130 km2.

The Kargaly is formed by the confluence of the Kuagash and Kokpekty rivers, which originate at the foot of Mount Zhylantau. It flows into the Ilek River near the city of Aktobe.
