= Tobol =

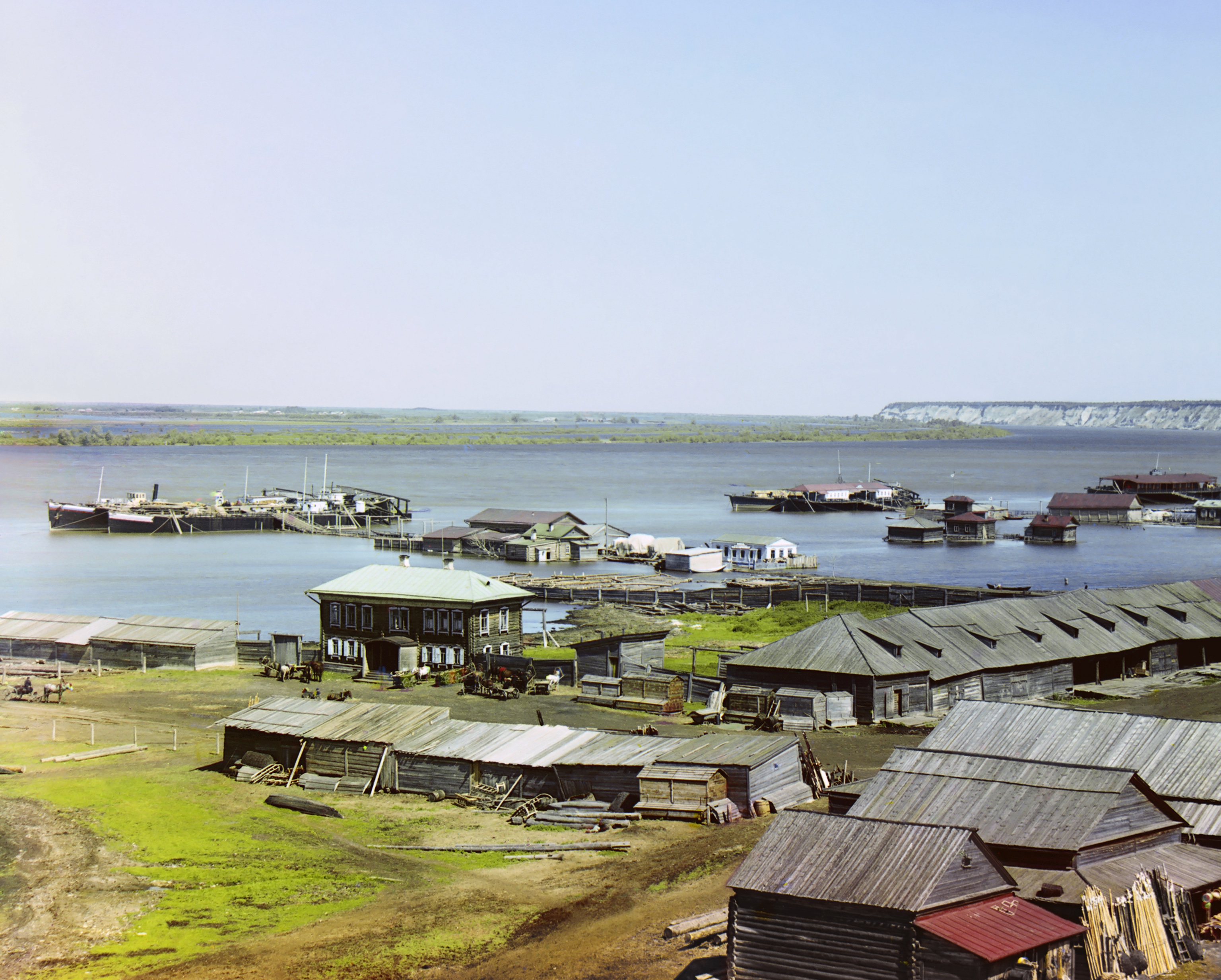
- Confluence of Irtysh and Tobol in Tobolsk in 1912

- Map of the Tobol watershed

- Location of mouth

Location
- Country: Russia, Kazakhstan

Physical characteristics
- Source: Turgay Plateau
  - location: Kairakty, Russia
  - coordinates: 51°28′01″N 61°00′29″E
  - elevation: 271 m (889 ft)
- Mouth: Irtysh
  - location: Tobolsk, Russia
  - coordinates: 58°09′14″N 68°12′55″E
  - elevation: 32 m (105 ft)
- Length: 1,591 km (989 mi)
- Basin size: 426,000 km^{2} (164,000 sq mi)
- Discharge
  - average: 805 cubic metres per second (28,400 cu ft/s)

Basin features
- Progression: Irtysh→ Ob→ Kara Sea
- River system: Ob

The Tobol (Russian: Тобол; Siberian Tatar: Тубыл) is a river in Western Siberia (in Kazakhstan and Russia) and the main (left) tributary of the Irtysh. Its length is 1,591 km (989 mi), and the area of its drainage basin is 426,000 km^{2} (164,000 sq mi).

== History ==
The Tobol River was one of the four important rivers of the Siberia Khanate. In 1428 the khan was killed in a battle with the forces of Abu'l-Khayr Khan at the Battle of Tobol.

In the 16th century, the Tobol was the eastern terminus of the portage route leading westward to the rivers Vishera and Kama.

== Cities and towns on the Tobol ==
- Lisakovsk in Kazakhstan
- Rudni in Kazakhstan
- Kostanay (formerly Nikolaevsk) in Kazakhstan
- Kurgan in the Russian Federation
- Yalutorovsk in the Russian Federation
- Tobolsk in the Russian Federation, where the Tobol joins the Irtysh

== Main tributaries ==
The largest tributaries of the Tobol are, from source to mouth:

- Syntasty (left)
- Ayat (left)
- Uy (left)
- Ubagan (right)
- Iset (left)
- Tura (left)
- Tavda (left)
