= Bukhtarma =

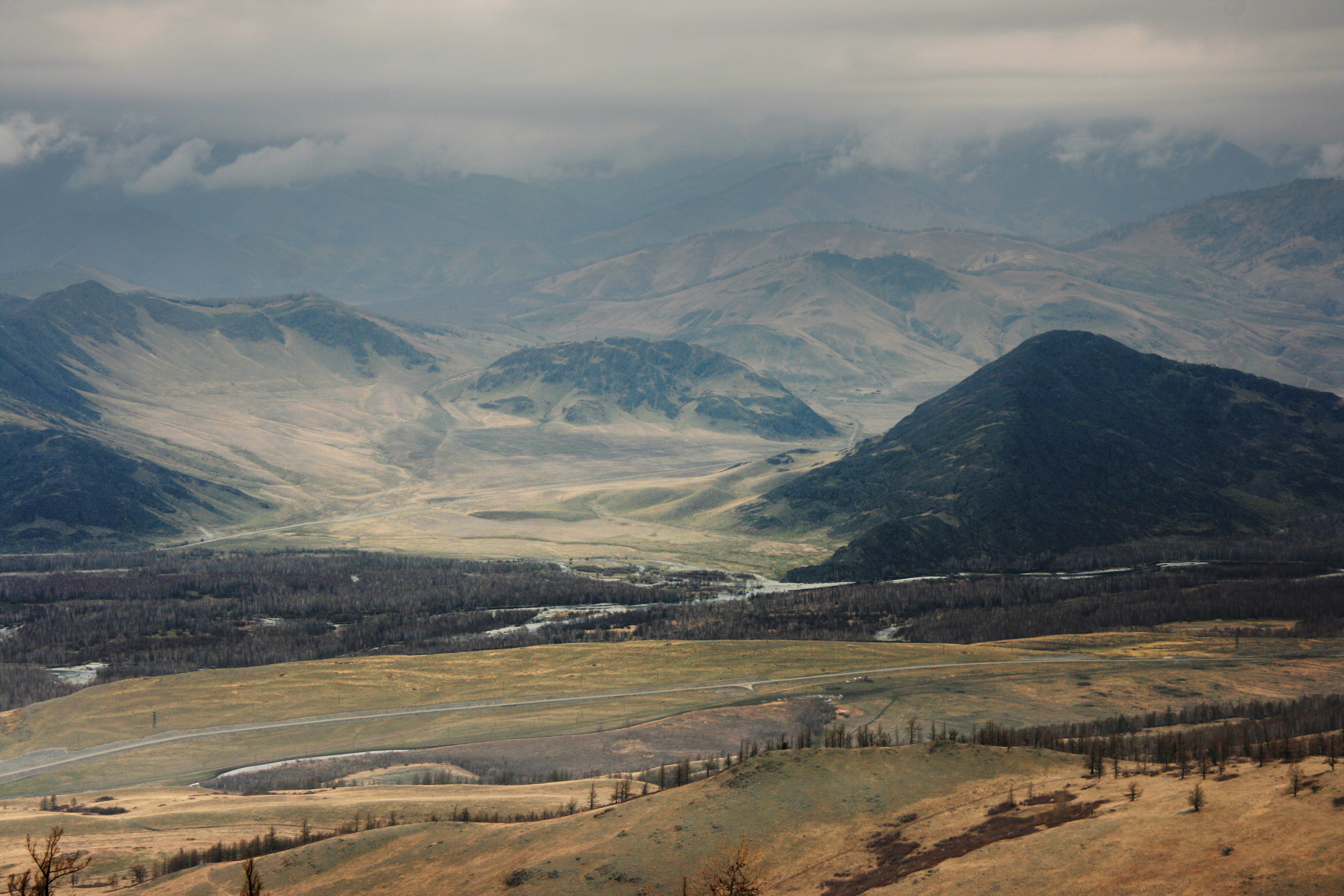
- The Bukhtarma in East-Kazakhstan Region

Location
- Country: Kazakhstan

Physical characteristics
- Mouth: Irtysh
  - coordinates: 49.7406°N 83.9903°E
- Length: 336 km (209 mi)
- Basin size: 12,660 km^{2} (4,890 sq mi)

Basin features
- Progression: Irtysh→ Ob→ Kara Sea

The Bukhtarma (Russian: Бухтарма [bʊxtɐrˈma]; Kazakh: Бұқтырма, romanized: Būqtyrma, pronounced [bʊχtʊrmɑ́]) is a river of Kazakhstan. It flows through East Kazakhstan Region, and is a right tributary of the Irtysh. The river is 336 kilometres (209 mi) long, with a basin area of 12,660 square kilometres (4,890 mi^{2}). The source of the river is in the Southern Altai Mountains. The average water flow rate is 214 cubic metres per second (7,600 cu ft/s).

The Bukhtarma Dam is on the Irtysh a few kilometers downstream from the mouth of Bukhtarma. The lower course of the Bukhtarma thus passes through the reservoir produced by the dam.

== History ==
The Battle of Irtysh River, also known as the Battle Along the Buqdarma, took place in 1208 between the Mongol Empire and an alliance of Merkit and Naimans near where Bukhtarma river becomes a tributary of the Irtysh.
