= Uy (Tobol) =

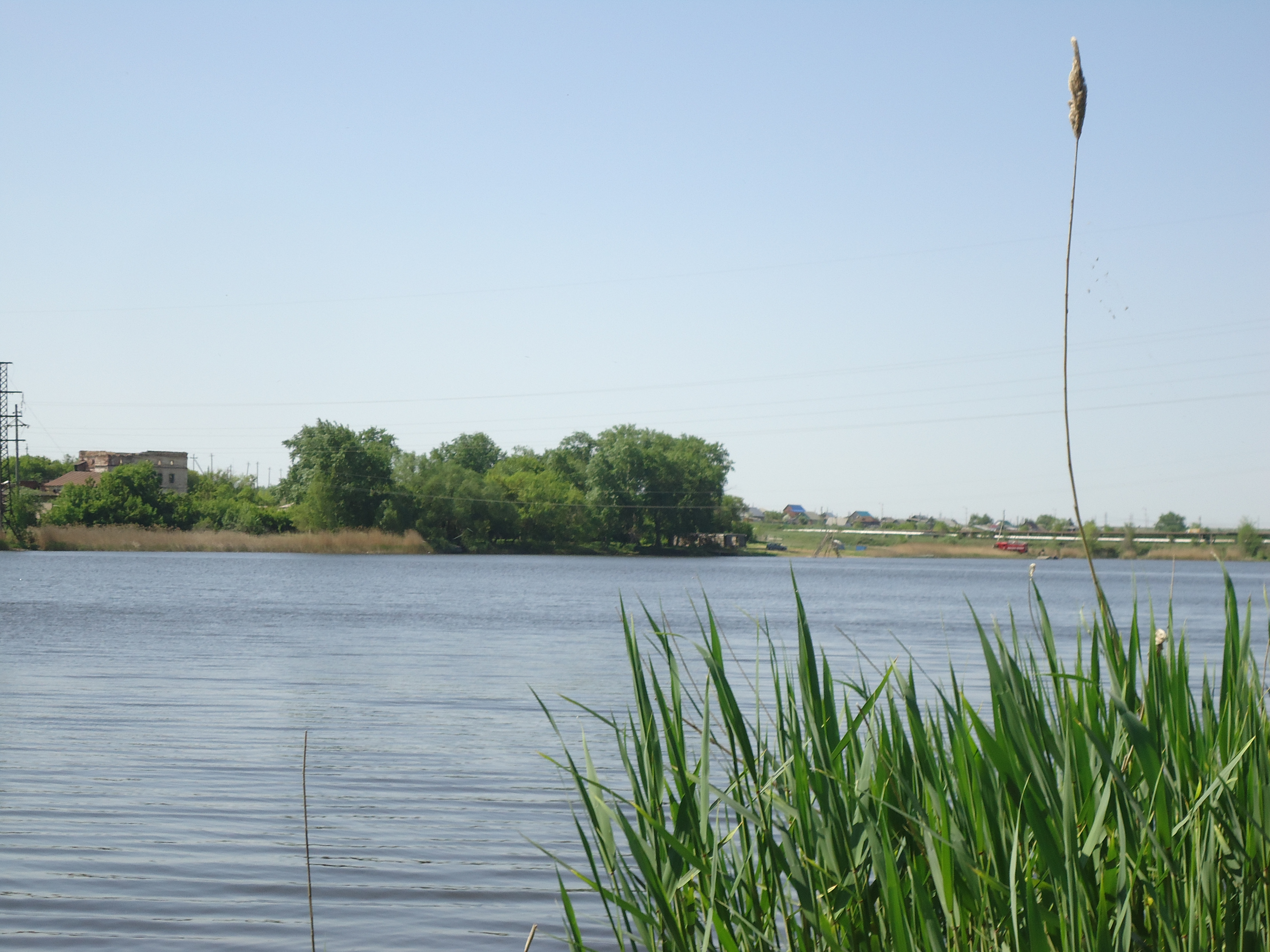

- The Uy in the Tobol watershed

Location
- Country: Russia

Physical characteristics
- Mouth: Tobol
  - coordinates: 54.2983°N 63.9792°E
- Length: 462 km (287 mi)
- Basin size: 58,900 km^{2} (22,700 sq mi)

Basin features
- Progression: Tobol→ Irtysh→ Ob→ Kara Sea

The Uy (Russian: Уй, Bashkir: Уй) is a river in Chelyabinsk Oblast in Russia with its upper reaches in Bashkortostan. It partially flows along the borders of Chelyabinsk and Kurgan Oblasts with Kazakhstan. The Uy is a left tributary of the Tobol. The length of the river is 462 km. The area of its basin is 34,400 km^{2}. It freezes up in November and stays icebound in April. The town of Troitsk and three reservoirs (the largest being Troitsk Reservoir) are situated on the Uy.

It rises in the southern Ural Mountains east of the headwaters of the Ural between Chelyabinsk and Magnitogorsk and flows east with many meanders past Troitsk to meet the Tobol near Zverinogolovskoye (formerly the fort of Ust-Uysk). The gold-mining town of Plast is on its headwaters. At the time of the Bashkir War of 1735-40 it was the eastern end of the Orenburg Line of forts and is now approximately part of the border between Russia and Kazakhstan. The Uy is the southernmost river on the east side of the Urals whose waters ultimately reach the Arctic Ocean. South of the Uy waters run to the river Ural which flows south into the Caspian Sea.

The name of the river comes from the Bashkir language, in which it means "valley, lowland".
