= Arys (river) =

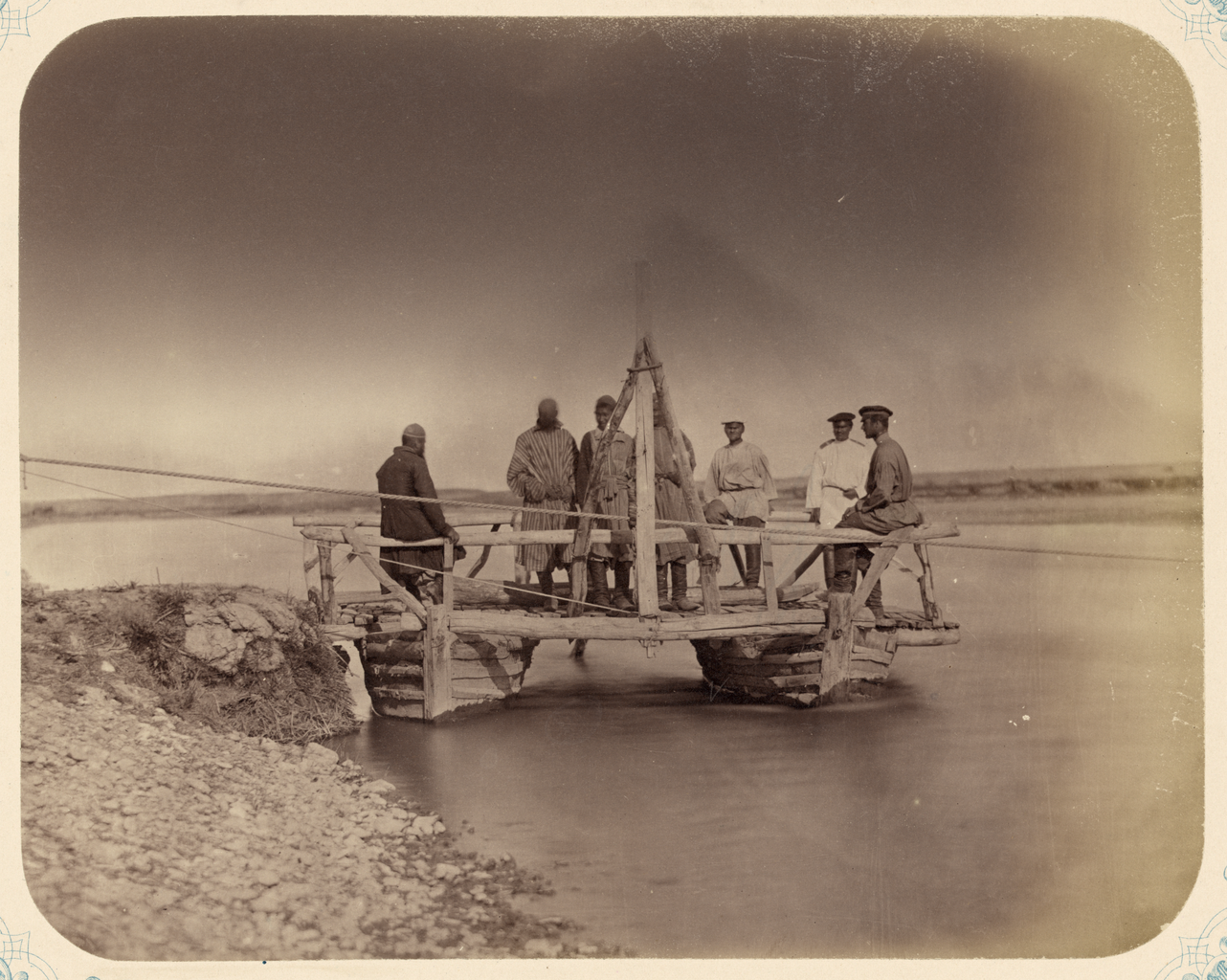

Location
- Country: Kazakhstan

Physical characteristics
- Mouth: Syr Darya
  - coordinates: 42°46′47″N 68°13′54″E
- Length: 378 km (235 mi)
- Basin size: 14,900 km^{2} (5,800 sq mi)

Basin features
- Progression: Syr Darya→ North Aral Sea

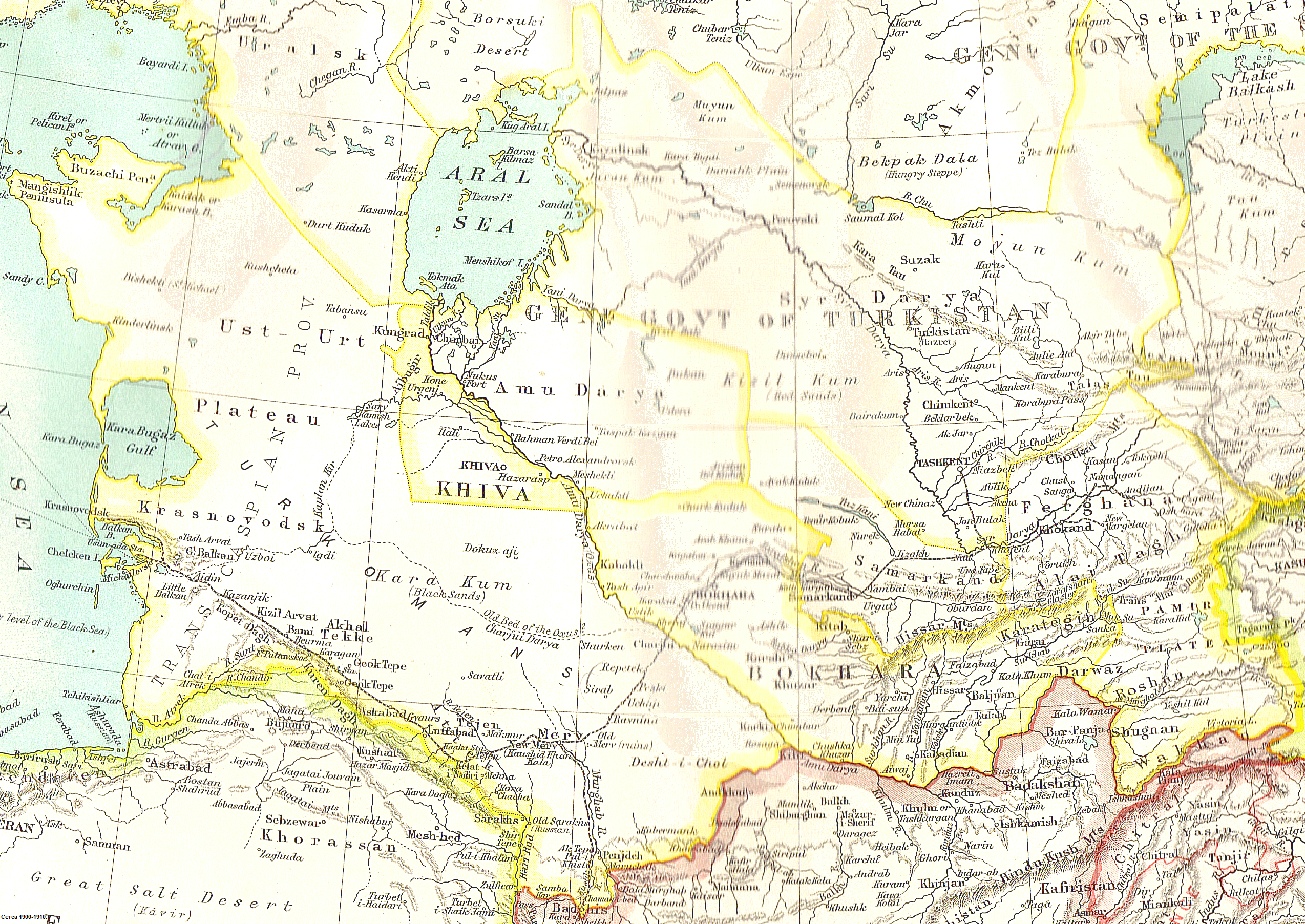
1903 map showing the Arys River. Double click to enlarge

The Arys (Kazakh: Арыс [ɑˈrəs]) is a river of southern Kazakhstan and a right tributary of the Syr Darya. The river is 378 kilometres (235 mi) long, covering a basin area of 14,900 square kilometres (5,800 mi^{2}).

The river begins in the Talas Alatau ridge, and average water flow is 46.6 cubic metres per second (1,650 cu ft/s). The highest runoff is in April during snow melt, the lowest is in August. The river is used for irrigation to grow rice in the lower reaches. The largest tributaries are the Mashat, Aksu, Boralday and the Badam.

The Arys has been populated by humans since ancient times, and was located to the north of the Silk Road. Numerous medieval castles, of which the most significant is Otrar, is located in the area.
