= Akhtuba =

River in Russia

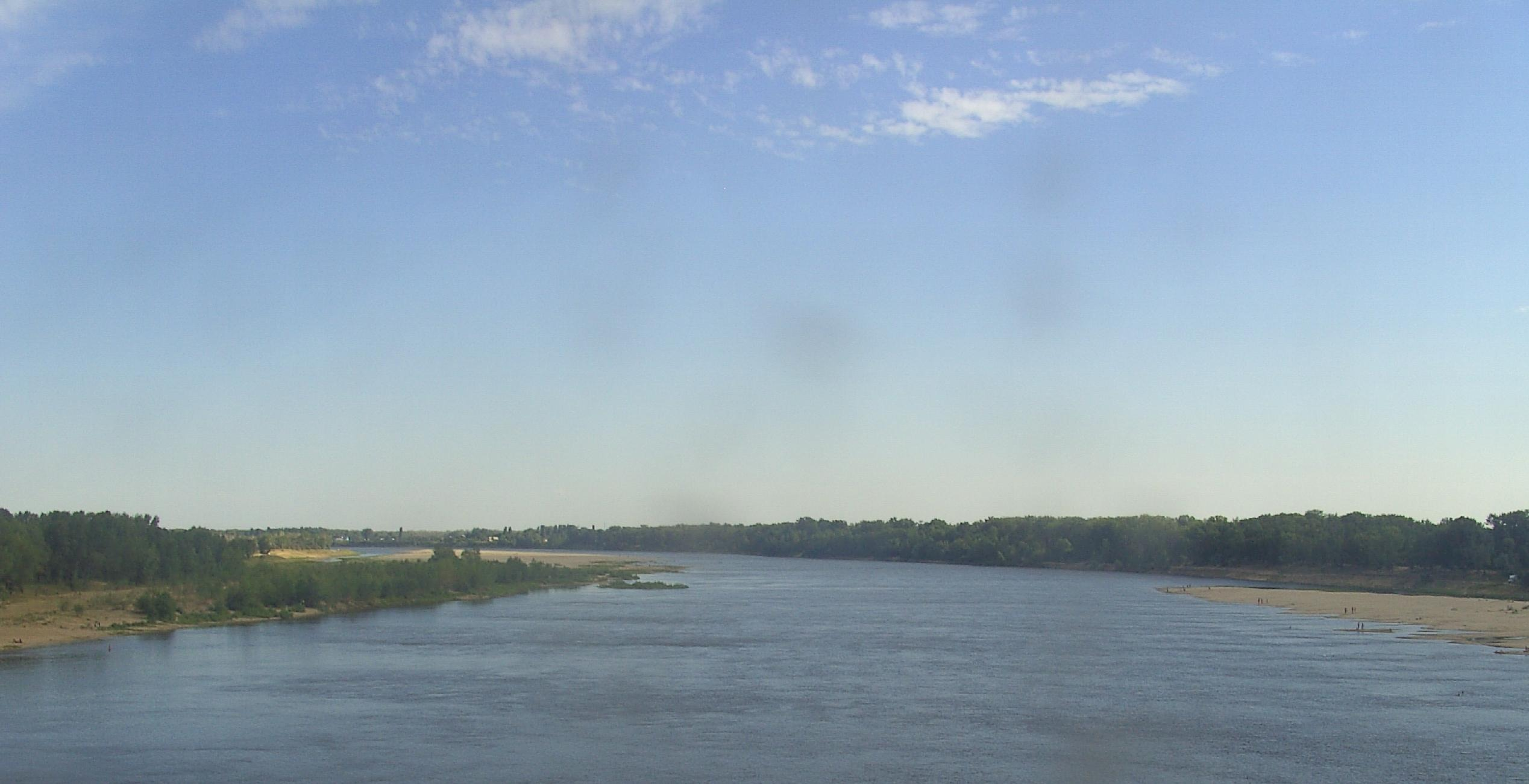
Akhtuba River

The Akhtuba (Russian: А́хтуба); also transliterated Achtuba on some maps) is a left distributary of the Volga in southern Russia.

The Akhtuba splits off the Volga shortly before the city of Volgograd (at 48.8167°N 44.6880°E), and flows toward the Volga Delta and Caspian Sea. The old beginning of Akhtuba was blocked by the dam of the Volga Hydroelectric Station; now it flows from the Volga via an artificial outtake canal 6.5 kilometres (4.0 mi) long that starts below the dam. The river is 537 kilometres (334 mi) long; the average water flow is 153 cubic metres per second (5,400 cu ft/s).

The following cities lie on or near the Akhtuba: Volzhsky (at the beginning of the river), Leninsk, Znamensk, Akhtubinsk, Kharabali (within 5 kilometres of the river). The capital of the Golden Horde, Sarai Batu, was most likely located along the Akhtuba as well, not far from Kharabali.

The area between the Volga and the Akhtuba is known as the Volga-Akhtuba plain, which is one of Russia's primary vegetable-growing regions. It is particularly well known as a major source of watermelons consumed in Russia.
