= Pskovsky =

Pskovsky (masculine), Pskovskaya (feminine), or Pskovskoye (neuter) may refer to:

- Pskovsky District, a district of Pskov Oblast, Russia
- Pskovsky (rural locality) (Pskovskaya, Pskovskoye), name of several rural localities in Russia
- Pskov Oblast (Pskovskaya oblast), a federal subject of Russia
- Ayke (village), Kazakhstan
