= Svetly, Svetlinsky District, Orenburg Oblast =

Rural locality in Orenburg Oblast, Russia

Svetly Светлый
- Selo
- Location within Orenburg Oblast Location within Russia
- Coordinates: 50°49′12″N 60°51′03″E
- Country: Russia
- Region: Orenburg Oblast
- District: Svetlinsky District
- Time zone: UTC+5:00

Svetly (Russian: Светлый) is a rural locality (a settlement) and the administrative center of Svetlinsky District, Orenburg Oblast, Russia. Population: 7,992 (2010 census); 9,026 (2002 census); 10,339 (1989 Soviet census).

== Geography ==
Lake Shalkar-Yega-Kara is located just to the south of the village, near the Kazakhstan–Russia border.
