= Ayke =

Lake in Kazakhstan and Russia

- Әйке
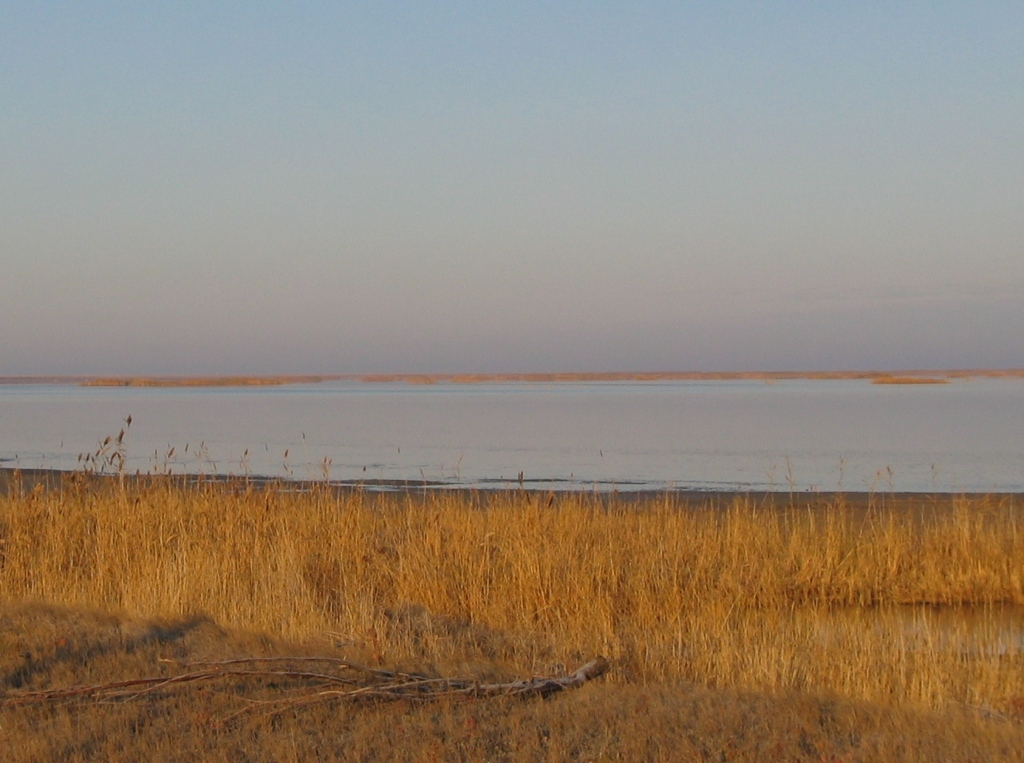

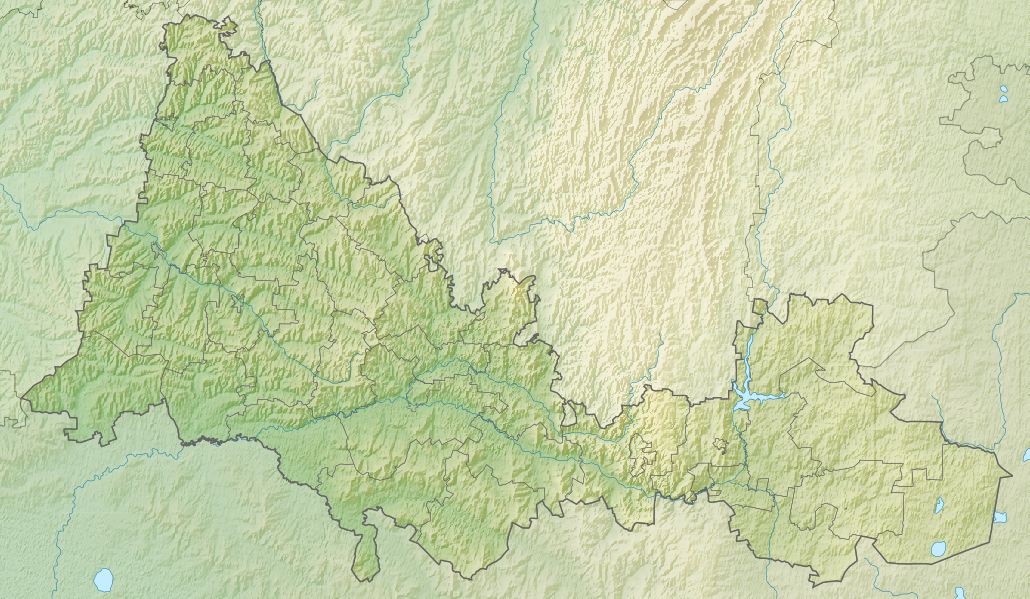
- Location within Kazakhstan Location within Orenburg Oblast
- Coordinates: 50°57′N 61°33′E
- Type: endorheic
- Basin countries: Kazakhstan, Russia
- Max. length: 12.5 kilometers (7.8 mi)
- Max. width: 8.5 kilometers (5.3 mi)
- Surface area: 65 square kilometers (25 sq mi)
- Surface elevation: 243 meters (797 ft)
- Settlements: Ayke

Ayke (Kazakh: Әйке, Äike) is a lake in the Ayteke Bi District, Aktobe Region, Kazakhstan.

== Geography ==
The lake is located on the Kazakhstan–Russia border. The border runs roughly from north to south and the largest part of the lake is in Kazakhstan, with only a small sector in the NW part within Russia. Ayke has an area of about 65 square kilometers (25 sq mi). The Kazakh village of Ayke is located on the eastern lakeshore. Lake Shalkar-Yega-Kara lies about 30 kilometers (19 mi) to the southwest, on the other side of the border, and lake Kulykol 40 kilometers (25 mi) to the NNE.

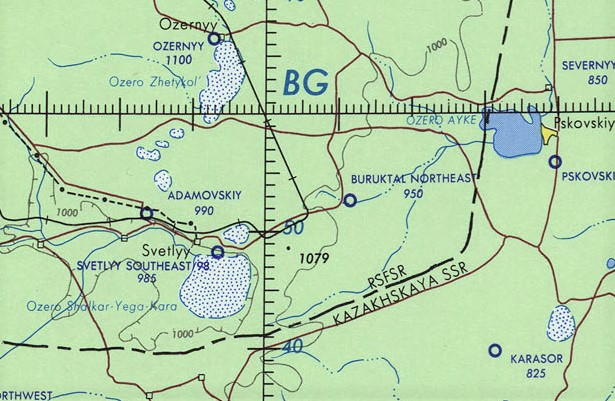
Shalkar-Yega-Kara and Ayke lakes ONC map section.

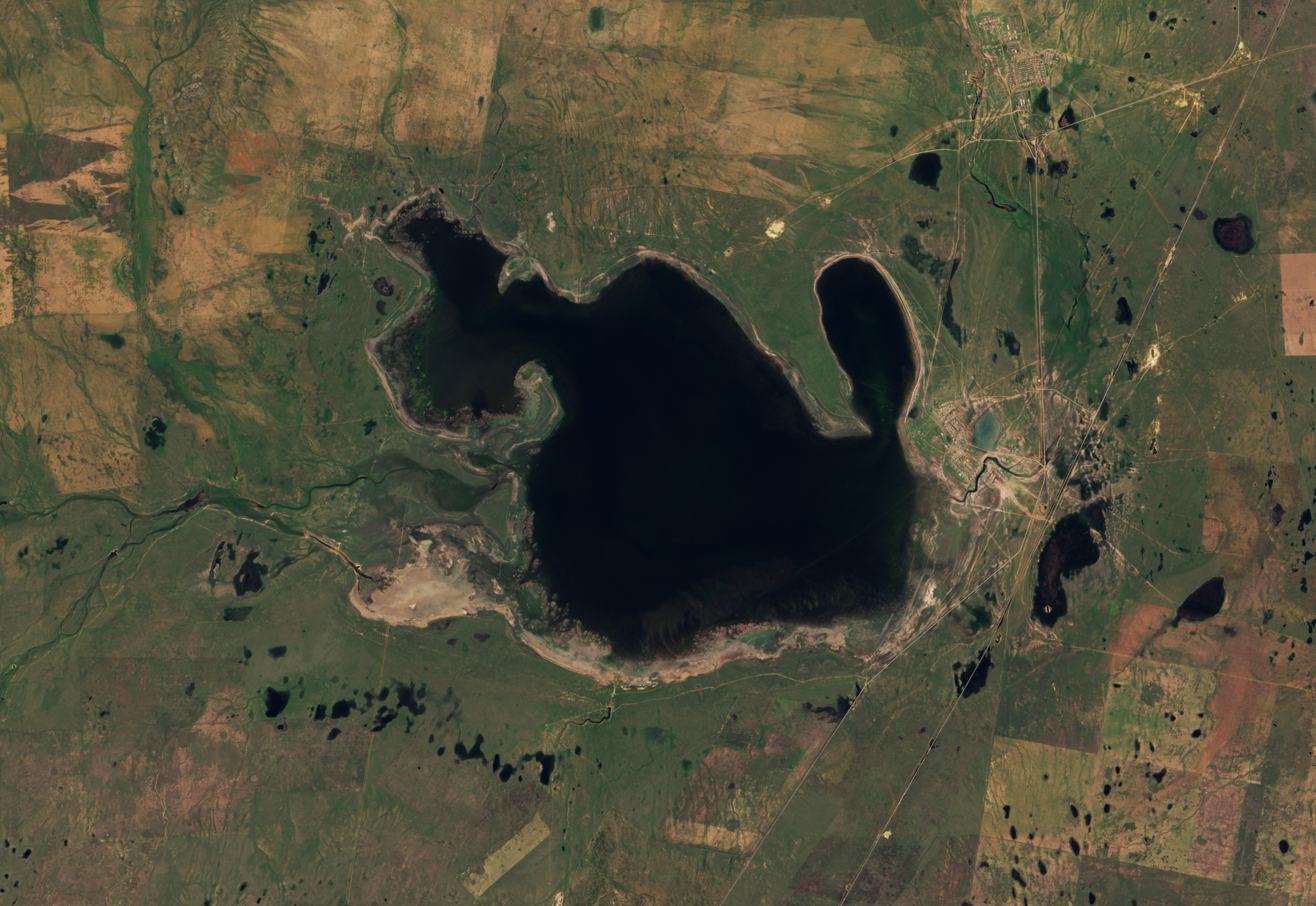
Lake Ayke as seen from space (Sentinel-2 L1C data, modified)

== See also ==
- List of lakes of Kazakhstan
