= Shalkar-Yega-Kara =

Lake in Orenburg Oblast, Russian Federation

- Шалкар-Ега-Кара
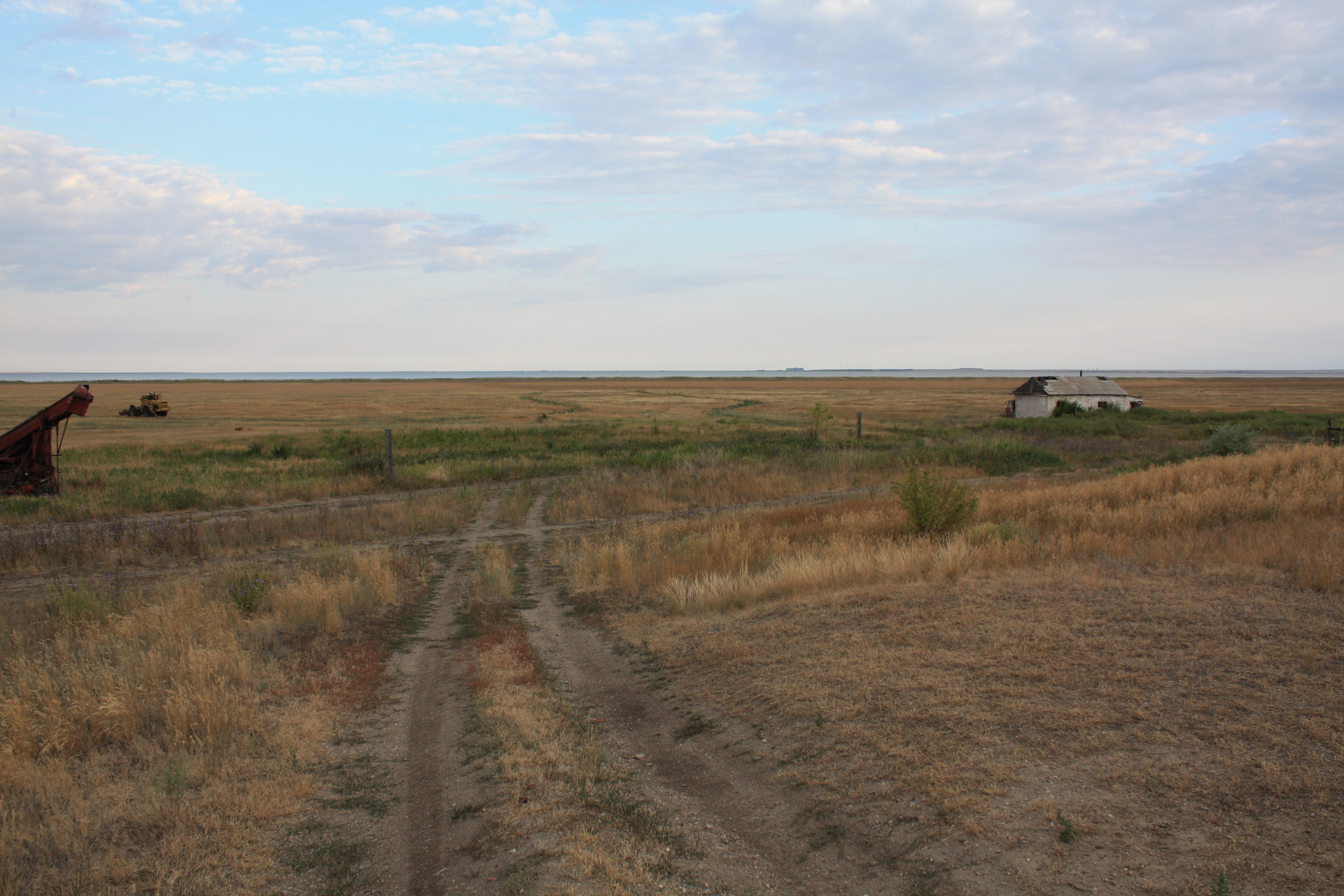
- Panorama of the lake

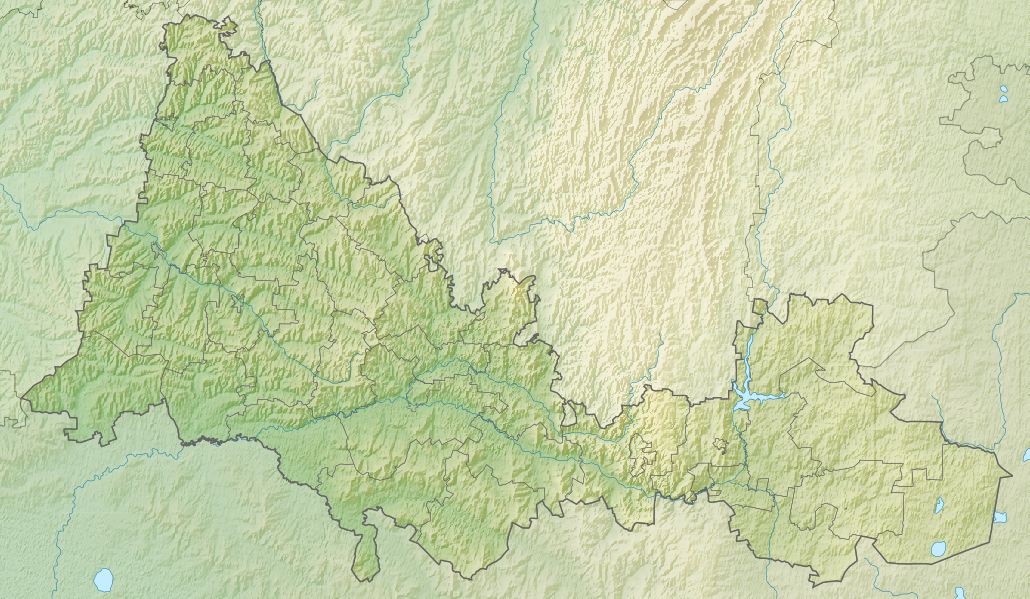
- Location within Orenburg Oblast Location within Russia
- Location: Southern Trans-Urals
- Coordinates: 50°49′N 61°0′E
- Type: endorheic
- Primary inflows: Buruktal
- Catchment area: 497 square kilometers (192 sq mi)
- Basin countries: Russia
- Max. length: 11 kilometers (6.8 mi)
- Max. width: 10 kilometers (6.2 mi)
- Surface area: 96.6 square kilometers (37.3 sq mi) to 65.9 square kilometers (25.4 sq mi)
- Average depth: 1 meter (3 ft 3 in)
- Shore length^{1}: 96 kilometers (60 mi)
- Surface elevation: 298 meters (978 ft)
- Islands: None
- Settlements: Svetly
- ^{1} Shore length is not a well-defined measure.

Shalkar-Yega-Kara (Russian: Шалкар-Ега-Кара) is a lake in Orenburg Oblast, Russian Federation.

The lake is located in the Svetlinsky District, close to the Kazakhstan–Russia border. Svetly village lies close to the northern shore of the lake.

== Geography ==
Shalkar-Yega-Kara is the largest lake in Orenburg Oblast. It is an almost round, shallow lake located at the bottom of a bowl-shaped depression in the steppe. Its shores are very gently sloping. Smaller lake Kayrankol lies to the north of its northeastern end. The only river feeding its waters is the Buruktal during the spring season, but in most years it doesn't reach the lake and the Shalkar-Yega-Kara dries completely up.

The Kazakhstan–Russia border runs barely 100 meters (330 ft) to the south of the southern shore. Lake Ayke is located about 30 kilometers (19 mi) to the northeast, on the other side of the Kazakh border.

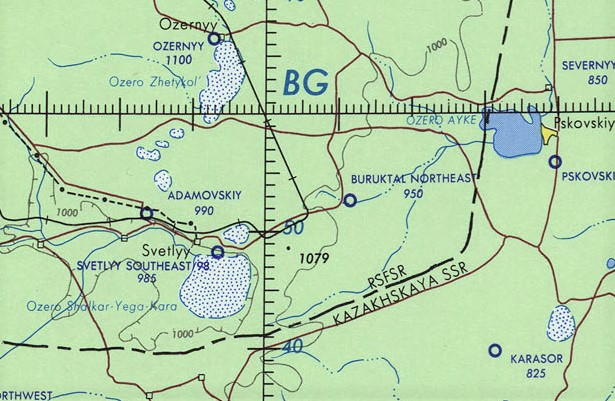
Shalkar-Yega-Kara and Ayke lakes ONC map section.

== Fauna ==
The main fish species in the Shalkar-Yega-Kara is the crucian carp. In the years where the Buruktal flows and fills the lake, perch, carp, ide and roach are also found. Certain spots of the lakeshore provide a breeding ground for terns, Dalmatian pelicans and Great cormorants.

== See also ==
- List of lakes of Russia
