= Svetlinsky District =

Svetlinsky District Светлинский район (Russian)
- District
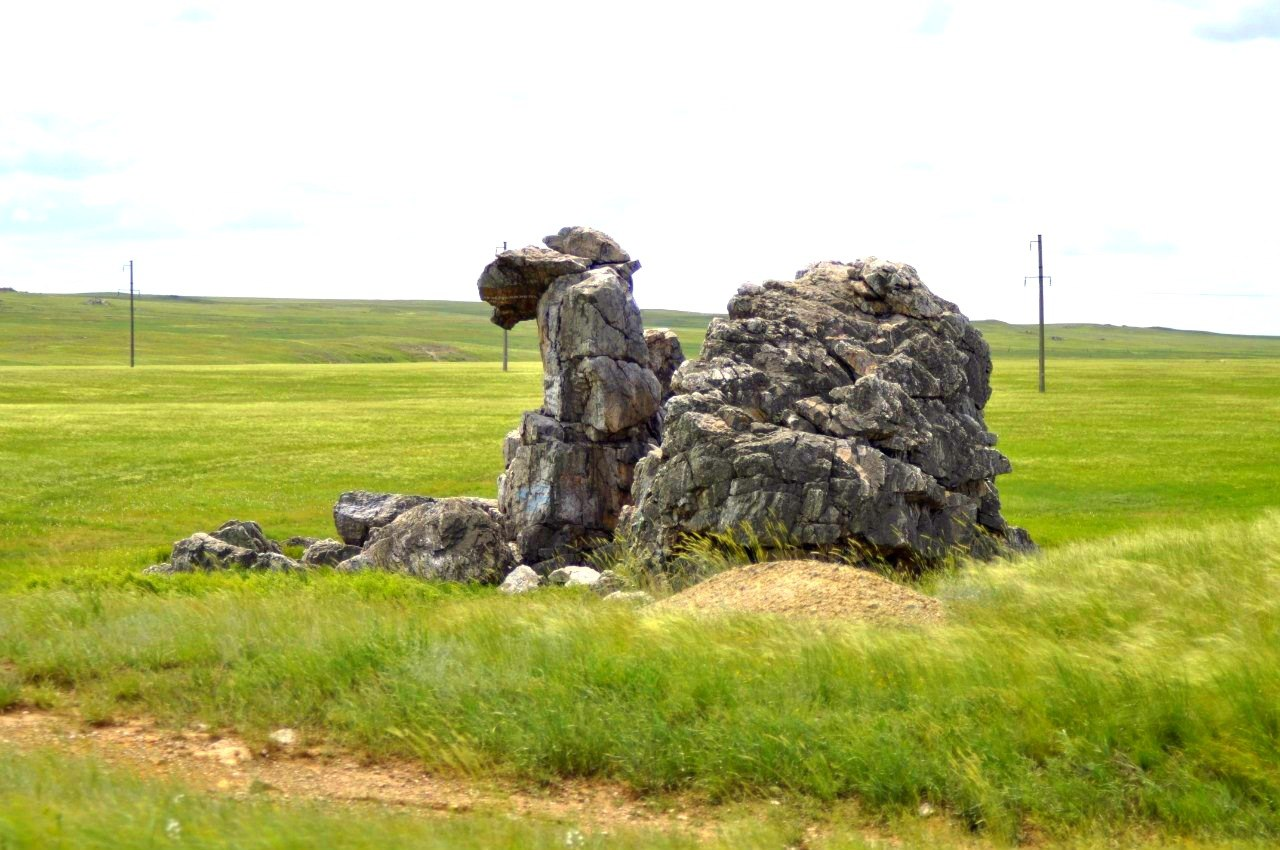
- "Camel Rock", Svetlinsky District

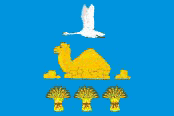
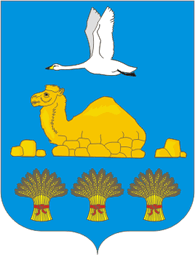
- Flag Coat of arms
- Location of Svetlinsky District in Orenburg Oblast
- Coordinates: 50°48′25″N 60°50′49″E
- Country: Russia
- Federal subject: Orenburg Oblast
- Established: 1965
- Administrative center: Svetly

Area
  - Total: 5,608 km^{2} (2,165 sq mi)

Population (2010 Census)
  - Total: 13,876
  - Density: 2.474/km^{2} (6.408/sq mi)
  - Urban: 0%
  - Rural: 100%

Administrative structure
  - Administrative divisions: 9 Selsoviets, 1 Settlement councils
  - Inhabited localities: 15 rural localities

Municipal structure
  - Municipally incorporated as: Svetlinsky Municipal District
  - Municipal divisions: 0 urban settlements, 9 rural settlements
- Time zone: UTC+5 (MSK+2)
- OKTMO ID: 53642000
- Website: http://www.svet.orb.ru/

Svetlinsky District (Russian: Све́тлинский райо́н) is an administrative and municipal district (raion), one of the thirty-five in Orenburg Oblast, Russia. It is located in the east of the oblast. The area of the district is 5,608 square kilometers (2,165 sq mi). Its administrative center is the rural locality (a settlement) of Svetly. Population: 13,876 (2010 Census); 18,356 (2002 census); 19,664 (1989 Soviet census). The population of Svetly accounts for 57.6% of the total district's population.

== Geography ==
Shalkar-Yega-Kara, the largest lake in Orenburg Oblast, is located in the district.
