= Ozinki =

Ozinki Озинки
- Urban-type settlement
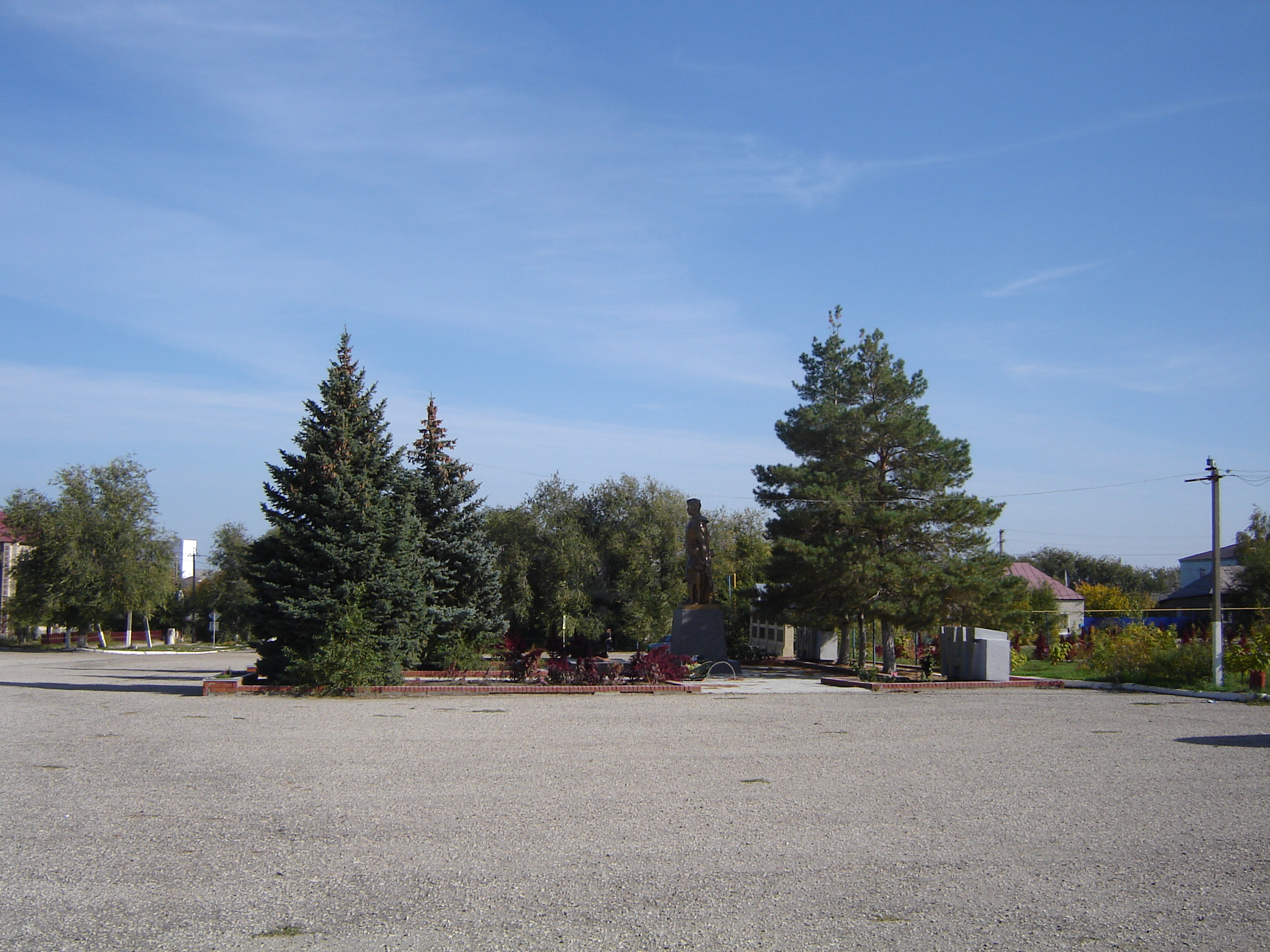
- Interactive map of Ozinki
- Location of Ozinki Ozinki (Saratov Oblast)
- Coordinates: 51.1983°N 49.7285°E
- Country: Russia
- Federal subject: Saratov Oblast
- Administrative district: Ozinsky District
- Founded: 1873

Population (2010 Census)
  - Total: 9,249
  - Estimate (2021): 7,690 (−16.9%)
- Time zone: UTC+4 (MSK+1)
- Postal code: 413620–413623
- OKTMO ID: 63632151051

Ozinki (Russian: Озинки) is an urban locality (an urban-type settlement) in Ozinsky District of Saratov Oblast, Russia. Population: 9,249 (2010 census); 9,806 (2002 census); 13,129 (1989 Soviet census). It is located adjacent to the Kazakhstan–Russia border.
