= Zhaisan =

Border crossing point between Kazakhstan and Russia

Coordinates: 47.468830°N 84.864609°E

Zhaisan is a border crossing point between Kazakhstan and Russia. It is located in the Aktobe Region, southeast of Lake Zaysan.

The functioning of the border crossing is affected by the actions of the Russia Customs, Russian Border Control and some other Russia bureaus in Sagarchin.

Distances from Zhaisan

- Orenburg: 154 km
- Aktobe: 131 km
