= Akbulaksky District =

Akbulaksky District Акбулакский район (Russian)
- District
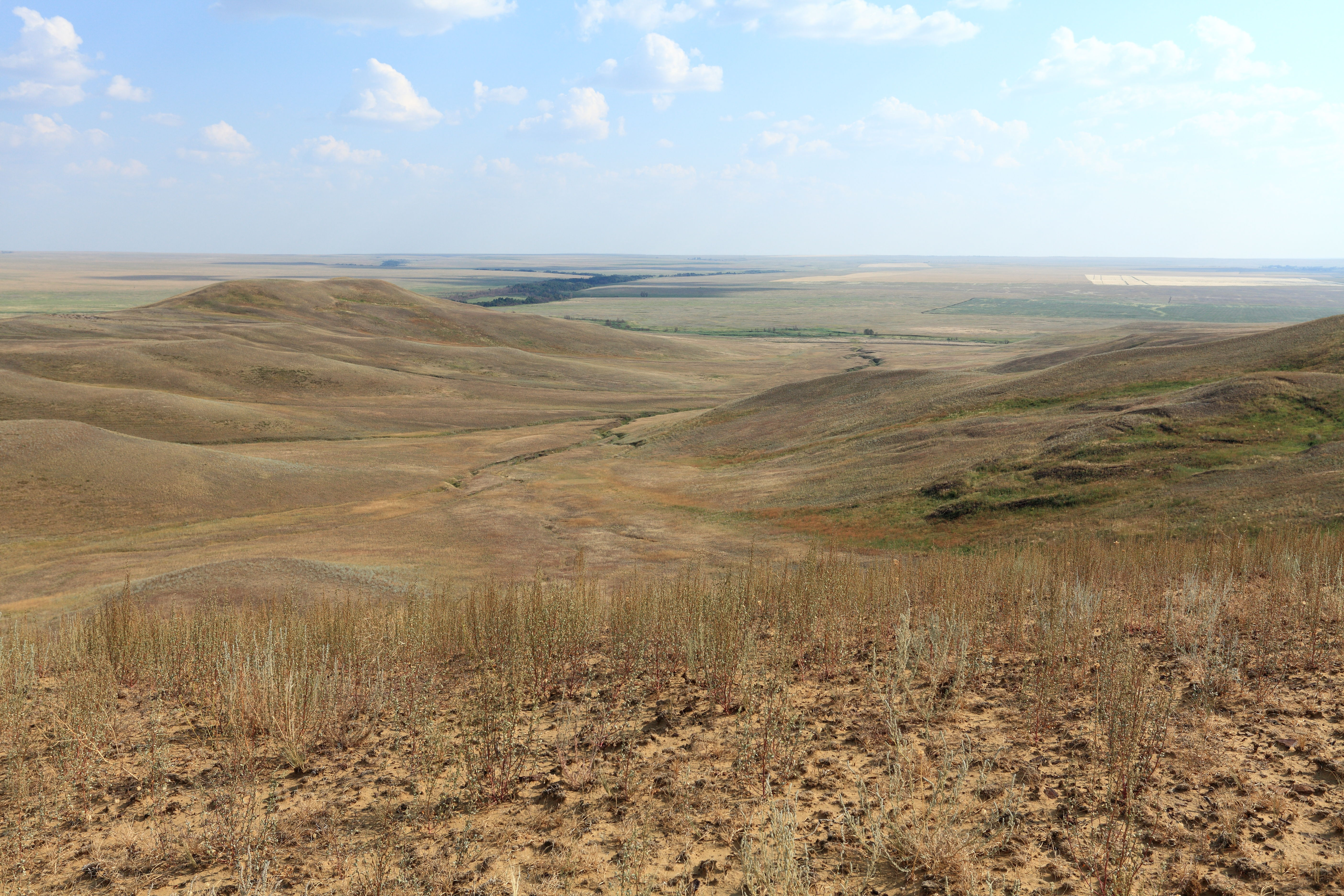
- Steppe landscape, Akbulaksky District

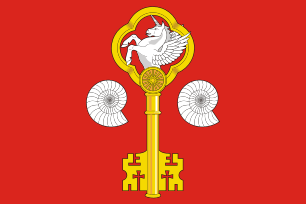
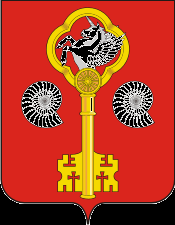
- Flag Coat of arms
- Location of Akbulaksky District in Orenburg Oblast
- Coordinates: 51°00′21″N 55°37′10″E
- Country: Russia
- Federal subject: Orenburg Oblast
- Administrative center: Akbulak

Area
  - Total: 5,000 km^{2} (1,900 sq mi)

Population (2010 Census)
  - Total: 25,606
  - Density: 5.1/km^{2} (13/sq mi)
  - Urban: 0%
  - Rural: 100%

Administrative structure
  - Administrative divisions: 17 Selsoviets
  - Inhabited localities: 47 rural localities

Municipal structure
  - Municipally incorporated as: Akbulaksky Municipal District
  - Municipal divisions: 0 urban settlements, 16 rural settlements
- Time zone: UTC+5 (MSK+2)
- OKTMO ID: 53605000
- Website: http://mo-ak.orb.ru/

Akbulaksky District (Russian: Акбула́кский райо́н; Kazakh: Ақбұлақ ауданы, Aqbulaq aýdany), also known as Ak-Bulaksky District (Ак-Булакский район), is an administrative and municipal district (raion), one of the thirty-five in Orenburg Oblast, Russia. The area of the district is 5,000 square kilometers (1,900 sq mi). Its administrative center is the rural locality (a settlement) of Akbulak. Population: 25,606 (2010 Census); 30,723 (2002 census); 29,683 (1989 Soviet census). The population of Akbulak accounts for 54.4% of the total district's population.

Sagarchin border checkpoint located in this district.

== History ==
Between 1921 and 1932, the district was a part of the Kirghiz Autonomous Socialist Soviet Republic (known as the Kazak ASSR since 1925). In February 1932, it became a part of Aktyubinsk Oblast and in the mid-1930s it was transferred to Chkalov Oblast (now Orenburg Oblast).
