= Ayteke Bi District =

Coordinates: 49°59′24″N 60°52′12″E

Ayteke Bi
- District
- Әйтеке би ауданы
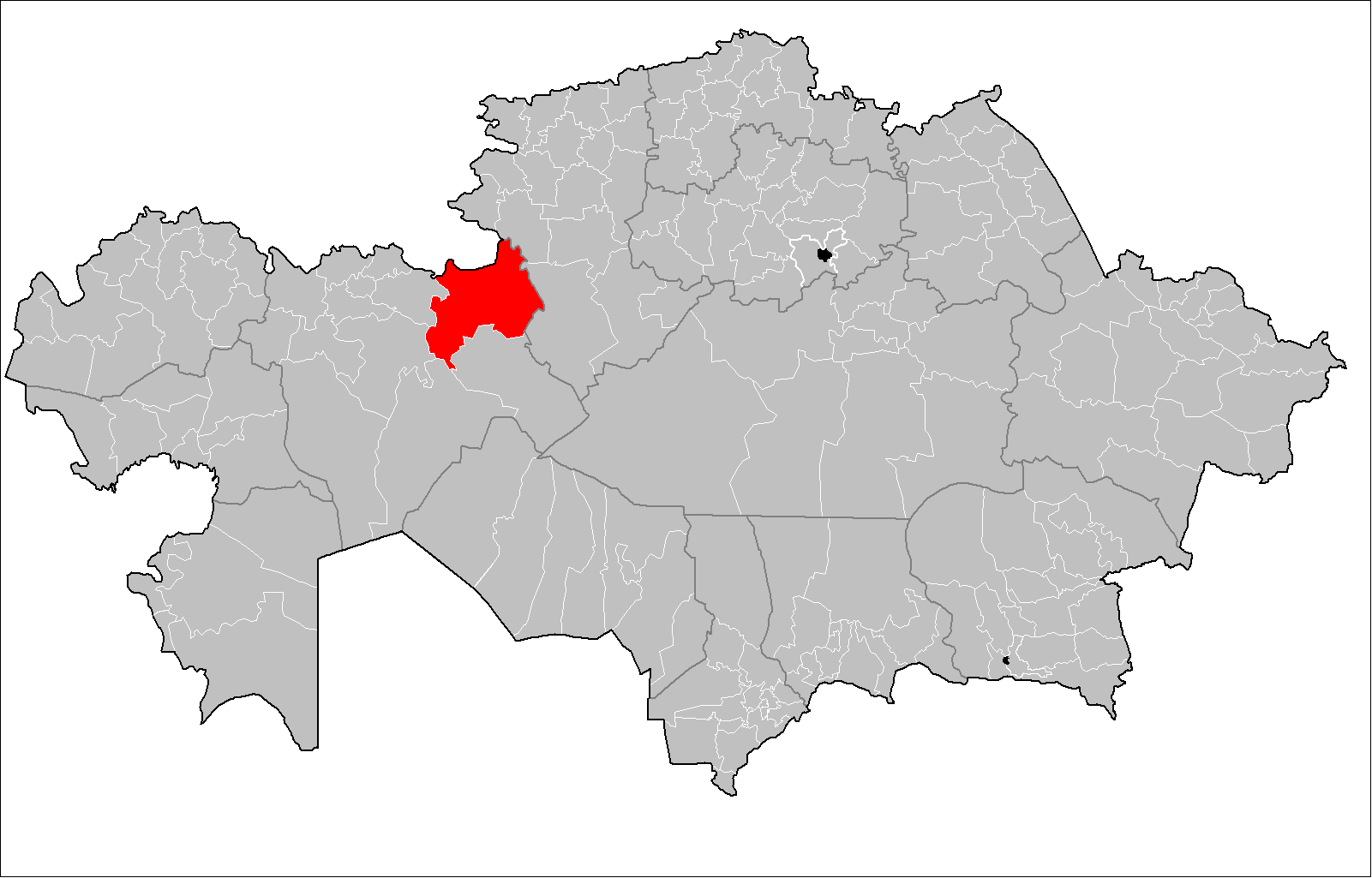
- Country: Kazakhstan
- Region: Aktobe Region
- Administrative center: Temirbek Zhurgenov

Government
  - Akim: Dauletiyar Tuguzbayev

Population (2013)
  - Total: 25,716
- Time zone: UTC+5 (West)

Ayteke Bi (Kazakh: Әйтеке би ауданы, Äiteke bi audany) is a district of Aktobe Region in Kazakhstan. Named after Aiteke Biy (1644–1700), a famous Kazakh biy (statesman and judge) from the Junior Uly Juz confederation who helped compile Kazakh customary law. The administrative center of the district is the selo of Temirbek Zhurgenov. Population: 25,716 (2013 estimate); 25,723 (2009 census results); 34,628 (1999 census results).

== Geography ==
Ayke lake is located in the district at the Kazakhstan–Russia border.
