= Ozinsky District =

Ozinsky District Озинский район (Russian)
- District
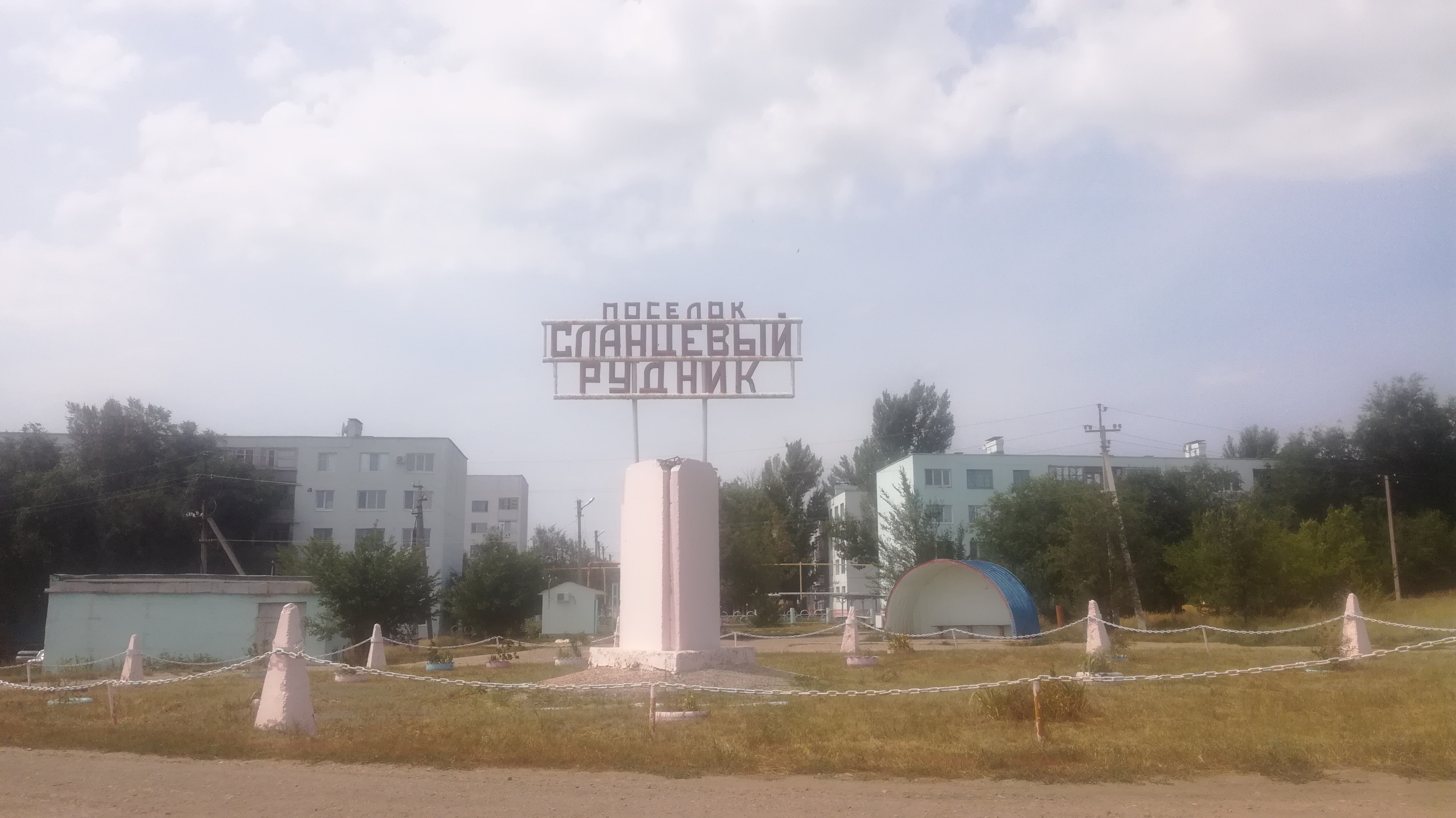
- Entrance to Slanceviyy Rudnik, Ozinsky District

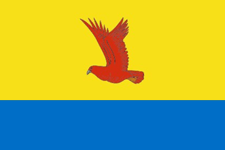
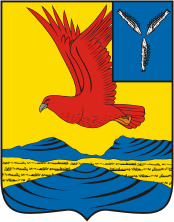
- Flag Coat of arms
- fgtr Location of Ozinsky District in Saratov Oblast
- Coordinates: 51°12′N 49°42′E
- Country: Russia
- Federal subject: Saratov Oblast
- Established: 23 July 1928
- Administrative center: Ozinki

Area
  - Total: 4,100 km^{2} (1,600 sq mi)

Population (2010 Census)
  - Total: 19,147
  - Density: 4.7/km^{2} (12/sq mi)
  - Urban: 48.3%
  - Rural: 51.7%

Administrative structure
  - Inhabited localities: 1 urban-type settlements, 37 rural localities

Municipal structure
  - Municipally incorporated as: Ozinsky Municipal District
  - Municipal divisions: 1 urban settlements, 10 rural settlements
- Time zone: UTC+4 (MSK+1)
- OKTMO ID: 63632000
- Website: http://ozinki.sarmo.ru/

Ozinsky District (Russian: Озинский райо́н) is an administrative and municipal district (raion), one of the thirty-eight in Saratov Oblast, Russia. It is located in the east of the oblast. The area of the district is 4,100 square kilometers (1,600 sq mi). Its administrative center is the urban locality (a work settlement) of Ozinki. Population: 19,147 (2010 Census); 23,568 (2002 census); 26,603 (1989 Soviet census). The population of Ozinki accounts for 48.3% of the district's total population.
