= Kaysatskoye =

Kaysatskoye Кайсацкое
- Selo
- Location within Volgograd Oblast Location within Russia
- Coordinates: 49°44′N 46°50′E
- Country: Russia
- Region: Volgograd Oblast
- District: Pallasovsky District
- Time zone: UTC+4:00

Kaysatskoye (Russian: Кайсацкое) is a rural locality (a selo) and the administrative center of Kaysatskoye Rural Settlement, Pallasovsky District, Volgograd Oblast, Russia. The population was 1,924 as of 2010. There are 23 streets. It is located on the Kazakhstan–Russia border, 41 km south from Pallasovka. Novy is the nearest rural locality.
