= Sagarchin =

Border town in Orenburg Oblast, Russia

Coordinates: 50°54′N 55°55′E

Sagarchin is a border crossing point between Kazakhstan and Russia. It is located in the Akbulaksky District, Orenburg Oblast, Russia.

The functioning of the border crossing is affected by the actions of the Kazakhstan Customs, Kazakhstan Border Control and some other Kazakhstan bureaus in Zhaisan.

Distances from Sagarchin

- Orenburg: 154 km
- Aktobe: 131 km
