= Vesyoloyarsk =

Vesyoloyarsk Весёлоярск
- Selo
- Interactive map of Vesyoloyarsk
- Location within Altai Krai Location within Russia
- Coordinates: 51°17′N 81°06′E
- Country: Russia
- Federal subject: Altai Krai
- Founded: 1887
- Elevation: 220 m (720 ft)

Population
  - Estimate (2021): 4,198 )
- Time zone: UTC+7 (MSK+4)
- Postal code: 658248
- OKTMO ID: 01638418101

Vesyoloyarsk (Russian: Весёлоярск) is a rural locality (a selo) and the administrative center of Vesyoloyarsky Selsoviet, Rubtsovsky District, Altai Krai, Russia. The population was 4,940 as of 2013. There are 26 streets. It is located adjacent to the Kazakhstan–Russia border.

== Geography ==
Vesyoloyarsk is located 27 km south of Rubtsovsk (the district's administrative centre) by road. Lokot and Novoaleksandrovka are the nearest rural localities.
