= Ayke (village) =

Ayke Әйке
- Village
- Location in Kazakhstan
- Coordinates: 50°58′08″N 61°38′34″E
- Country: Kazakhstan
- Region: Aktobe Region
- District: Ayteke Bi District

Population (2009)
  - Total: 1,058
- Time zone: UTC+5 (Central Asia Time)
- Post code: 030101

Ayke (Kazakh: Әйке), formerly "Pskovskoye" (Псковское), is a village in the Ayteke Bi District, Aktobe Region, Kazakhstan. It is the head of the Ayke Rural District (KATO code - 153441100). Population: 1,058 (2009 census results); 1,510 (1999 census results).

== Geography ==
The village is located by the eastern shore of lake Ayke.
