= Kazakhstan–Russia border =

Longest international border in the world

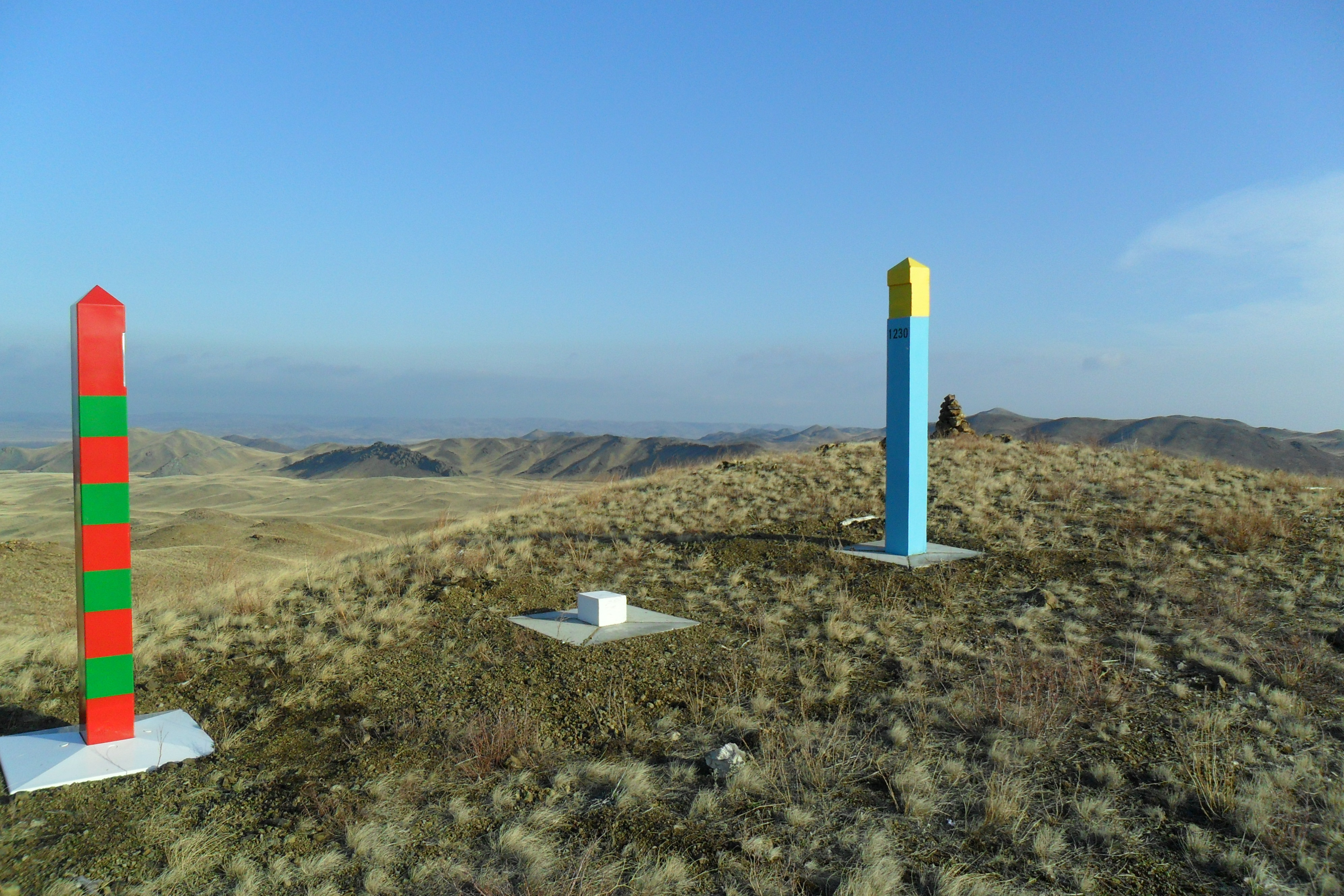
- Pillars marking the border

Characteristics
- Entities: Kazakhstan; Russia
- Length: 7644 km

History
- Established: 1936; Kazakh Soviet Socialist Republic
- Current shape: 1991; Dissolution of the Soviet Union

Kazakhstani and Russian boundary markers

The Kazakhstan–Russia border (Note: Kazakh: Қазақстан-Ресей шекарасы, romanized: Qazaqstan-Resei şekarasy, IPA: [qɑzɑqstɑ́n‿rʲesʲéj ʃʲekʰɑrɑsə́]; Russian: Казахстанско-российская граница, romanized: Kazahstansko-rossiyskaya granitsa, IPA: [kəzɐxˌstanskə‿rɐˈsʲijskəjə ɡrɐˈnʲitsə]) is the 7,644-kilometre (4,750 mi) international border between the Republic of Kazakhstan and the Russian Federation. It is the longest continuous international border in the world and the second longest by total length, after the Canada–United States border. It is in the same location as the former administrative-territorial border between the Kazakh Soviet Socialist Republic and the Russian Soviet Federative Socialist Republic within the Soviet Union.

== Geography ==
The border starts in the west at the Caspian Sea and runs in a broadly west–east direction to the tripoint with China, though in places it is extremely convoluted. The border consists almost entirely of a series of overland lines traversing the Eurasian Steppe, though in sections rivers are utilised, such as the Maly Uzen, Ural and Uy. The border runs across lakes Botkul and Bura. In the far eastern section the border runs through the Altai Mountains.

=== Settlements ===
The following towns and cities of Kazakhstan lie adjacent to the border:

- Kurmangazy
- Saykyn
- Zhanybek
- Oral
- Zhetikara
- Petropavl

The following towns and cities of Russia lie adjacent to the border:

- Marfino
- Astrakhan
- Kaysatskoye
- Pallasovka
- Alexandrov Gay
- Ozinki
- Orsk
- Novotroitsk
- Dombarovsky
- Troitsk
- Isilkul
- Gornyak

=== Subnational entities ===
The following Regions of Kazakhstan (oblystar) lie on the border:

- Atyrau Region
- West Kazakhstan Region
- Aktobe Region
- Kostanay Region
- North Kazakhstan Region
- Pavlodar Region
- East Kazakhstan Region

The following Federal subjects of Russia lie on the border:

1. Astrakhan Oblast
2. Volgograd Oblast
3. Saratov Oblast
4. Samara Oblast
5. Orenburg Oblast
6. Chelyabinsk Oblast
7. Kurgan Oblast
8. Tyumen Oblast
9. Omsk Oblast
10. Novosibirsk Oblast
11. Altai Krai
12. Altai Republic

== History ==
Russia had conquered Central Asia in the 19th century, by annexing the formerly independent Khanates of Kokand and Khiva and the Emirate of Bukhara. After the Communists took power in 1917 and created the Soviet Union it was decided to divide Central Asia into ethnically based republics in a process known as National Territorial Delimitation (or NTD). This was in line with Communist theory that nationalism was a necessary step on the path towards an eventually communist society, and Joseph Stalin's definition of a nation as being “a historically constituted, stable community of people, formed on the basis of a common language, territory, economic life, and psychological make-up manifested in a common culture”.

Map of the area of modern Kazakhstan from 1914, showing the former Oblasts of Ural, Turgay, Akmolinsk and Semipalatinsk

The NTD is commonly portrayed as being nothing more than a cynical exercise in divide and rule, a deliberately Machiavellian attempt by Stalin to maintain Soviet hegemony over the region by artificially dividing its inhabitants into separate nations and with borders deliberately drawn so as to leave minorities within each state. Though indeed the Soviets were concerned at the possible threat of pan-Turkic nationalism, as expressed for example with the Basmachi movement of the 1920s, closer analysis informed by the primary sources paints a much more nuanced picture than is commonly presented.

NTD of the area along ethnic lines had been proposed as early as 1920. During Tsarist times the general area of modern Kazakhstan was composed of four regions (oblasts); west-to-east these were Ural (plus part of Transcaspian Oblast), Turgai, Akmolinsk and Semipalatinsk. All four oblasts had been created by a Decree of Tsar Alexander II of 21 October (2 November) 1868. On 26 August 1920 the Kirghiz Autonomous Socialist Soviet Republic (KASSR, located within the Russian Soviet Federative Socialist Republic, RSFSR) was created from these four provinces (briefly joined in this period in the short-lived Alash Autonomy), with the northern border of the ASSR essentially following that of the former four oblasts, though adjusted in places to reflect local demographics; however, disputes over specific areas of the boundary continued into the following year. At this time Kazakhs were referred to as "Kyrgyz" and what are now the Kyrgyz were deemed a sub-group of the Kazakhs and referred to as "Kara-Kyrgyz" (i.e. mountain-dwelling black-Kyrgyz). The areas west of the Ural river associated with the Kazakh Bukey Horde were claimed by both the KASSR and Astrakhan Oblast, with most of the area going to the KASSR in 1921, including Kurmangazy and Sinemorsk. Elsewhere, some Russian-inhabited areas of the four oblasts, such as Omsk, were transferred to Russia.

Soviet Central Asia in 1922

On 22 September 1920 Orenburg was transferred to the KASSR and became its capital, along with surrounding parts of Orenburg Oblast such as Sol-Iletsk, Akbulak and Sharlyk. It is thought that the decision to shift the capital to Orenburg was because at that time it was the only large industrial city in the Kazakh-inhabited region and it was hoped that it would assist in the KASSR's economic development, as well as act as a bridge between the Russian lands to the north and the Turkic lands to the south. However, in early 1925 the capital of the KASSR was moved from Orenburg to the southern city of Ak-Mechet, with Orenburg and the surrounding lands being transferred back to Russia.

The boundary became an international frontier in 1991 following the dissolution of the Soviet Union and the independence of its constituent republics. Thousands of ethnic Russians who had migrated to Kazakhstan in Soviet times left, fearing marginalisation in the new Kazakh-dominated state. In 1989 the Russian population stood at about 6,227,549 (37.82% of the population), though by 1999 this figure had fallen to 4,479,618 (29.95%) and in 2009 it stood at 3,793,764 (23.69%). As of 2019 Russians are estimated to make up 19.3% of the population and are heavily concentrated in the country's north along the Russian border.

Negotiations on border delimitation took place from 1999 to 2005, with a final treaty being approved in Moscow by Presidents Vladimir Putin and Nursultan Nazarbayev on 18 January 2005. The treaty entered into force on 12 January 2006. On-the-ground demarcation started in July 2007, with a series of pillars marking the frontier beginning to be erected from May 2009. When the border became international in 1991, one branch of the Trans-Siberian Railway was interrupted by two border crossings at Petropavl. In 2017, Russia and Kazakhstan agreed to create a transit (corridor) without border controls.

== Border crossings ==
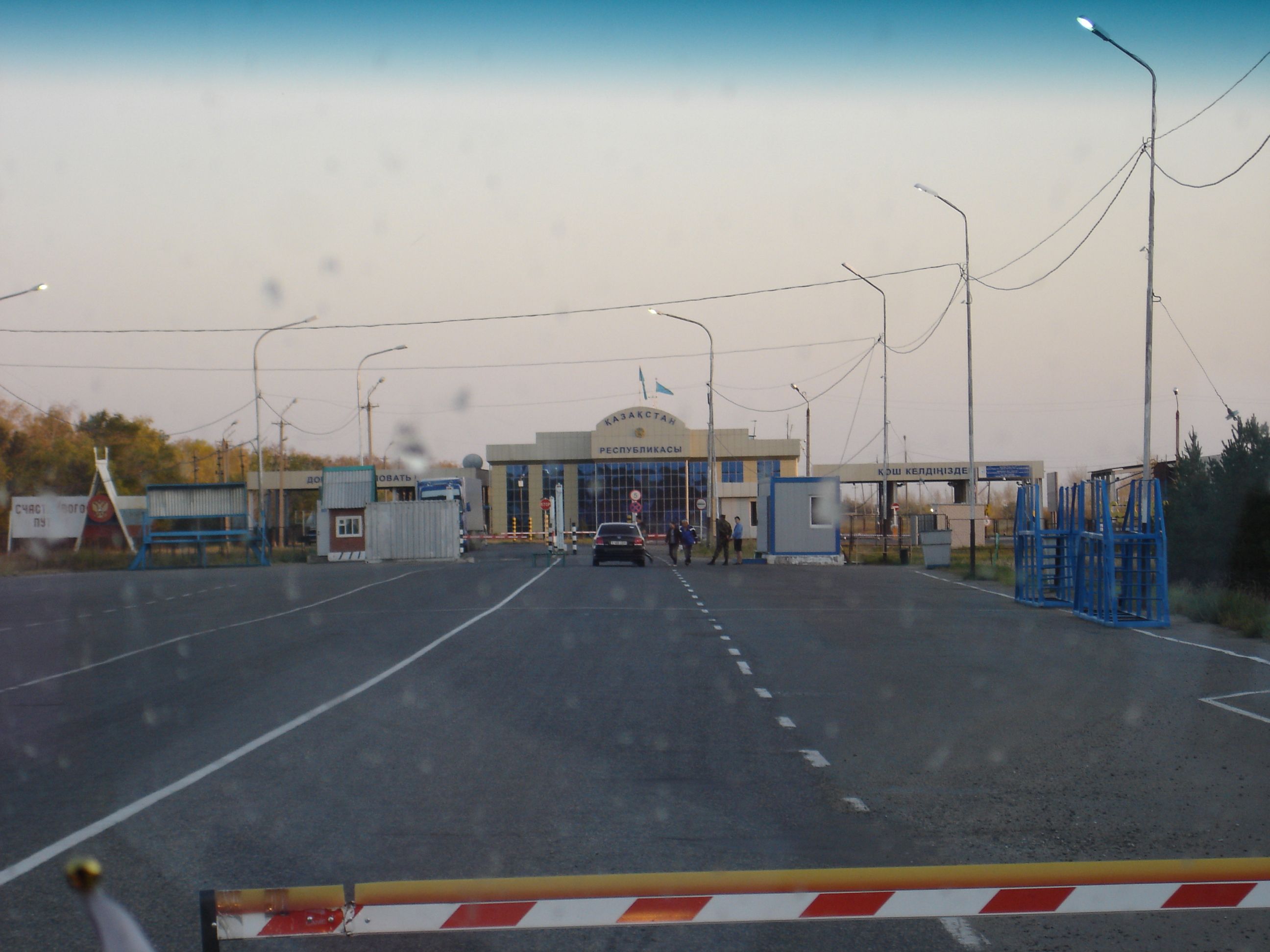
The Orlyu-Tobe border crossing

There are numerous border crossings along the lengthy frontier:

- Kurmangazy (KAZ) - Karaozek (RUS)
- Taskala (KAZ) - Ozinki (RUS)
- Aksay (KAZ) - Ilek (RUS)
- Bidaik (KAZ) - Odesskoye (RUS)
- Alimbetovka (KAZ) - Orsk (RUS)
- Zhaisan (KAZ) - Sagarchin (RUS)
- Kayerak (KAZ) - Bugristoye (RUS)
- Akbalshyk (KAZ) - Voskresenskoye (RUS)
- Zhanazhol (KAZ) - Petukhovo (RUS)
- Karakoga (KAZ) - Isilkul (RUS)
- Urlitobe (KAZ) - Cherlak (RUS)
- Sulu-Agash (KAZ) - Karasuk (RUS)
- Sharbakty (KAZ) - Kulunda (RUS)
- Auyl (KAZ) - Vesyoloyarsk (RUS)
- Ube (KAZ) - Mikhaylovka (RUS)
- Zhezkent (KAZ) - Gornyak (RUS)

== Historical maps ==
Historical English-language maps of the Kazakh SSR-Russian SSR border from the Caspian Sea to the border with China, mid to late 20th century:

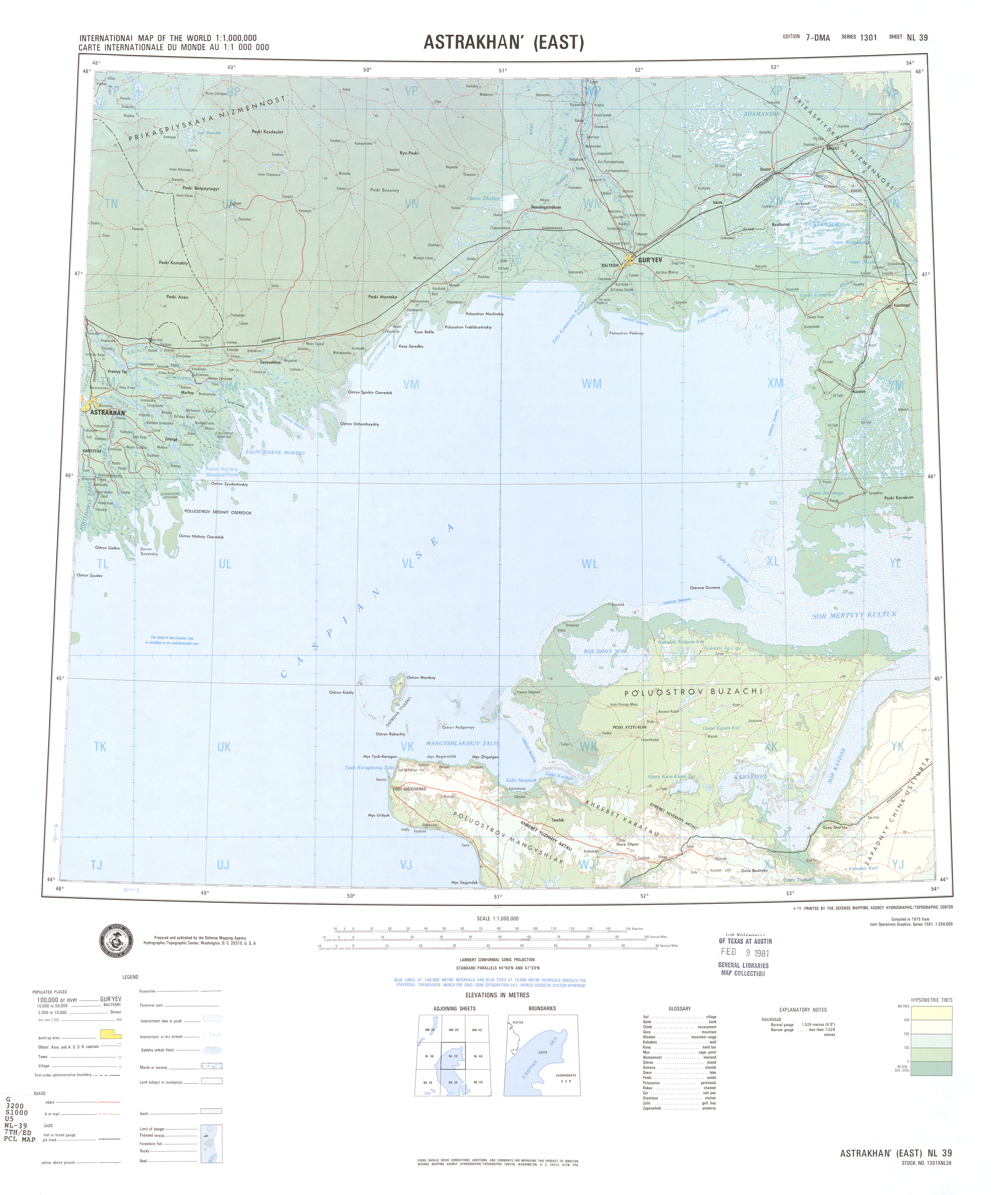
Caspian Sea

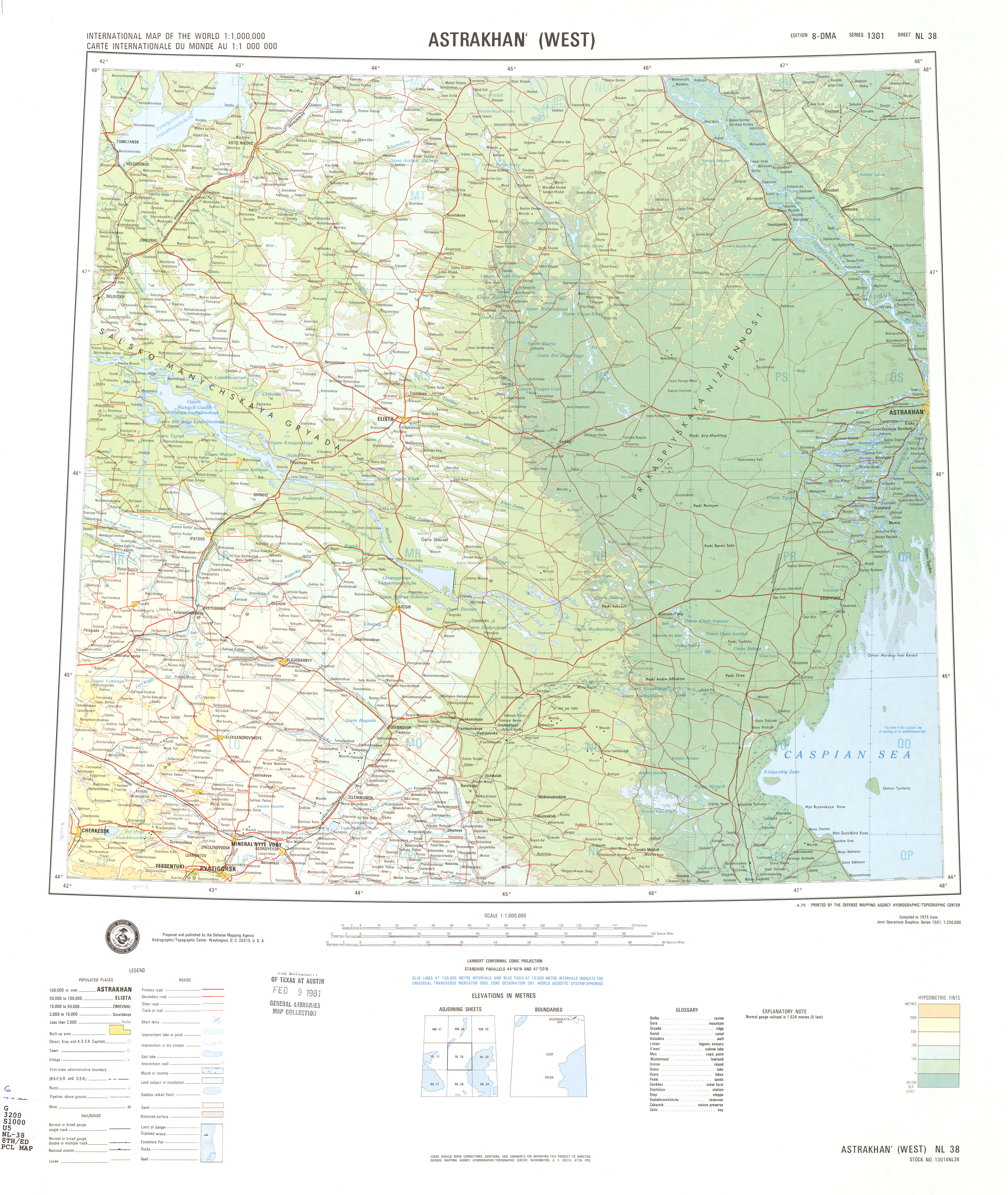

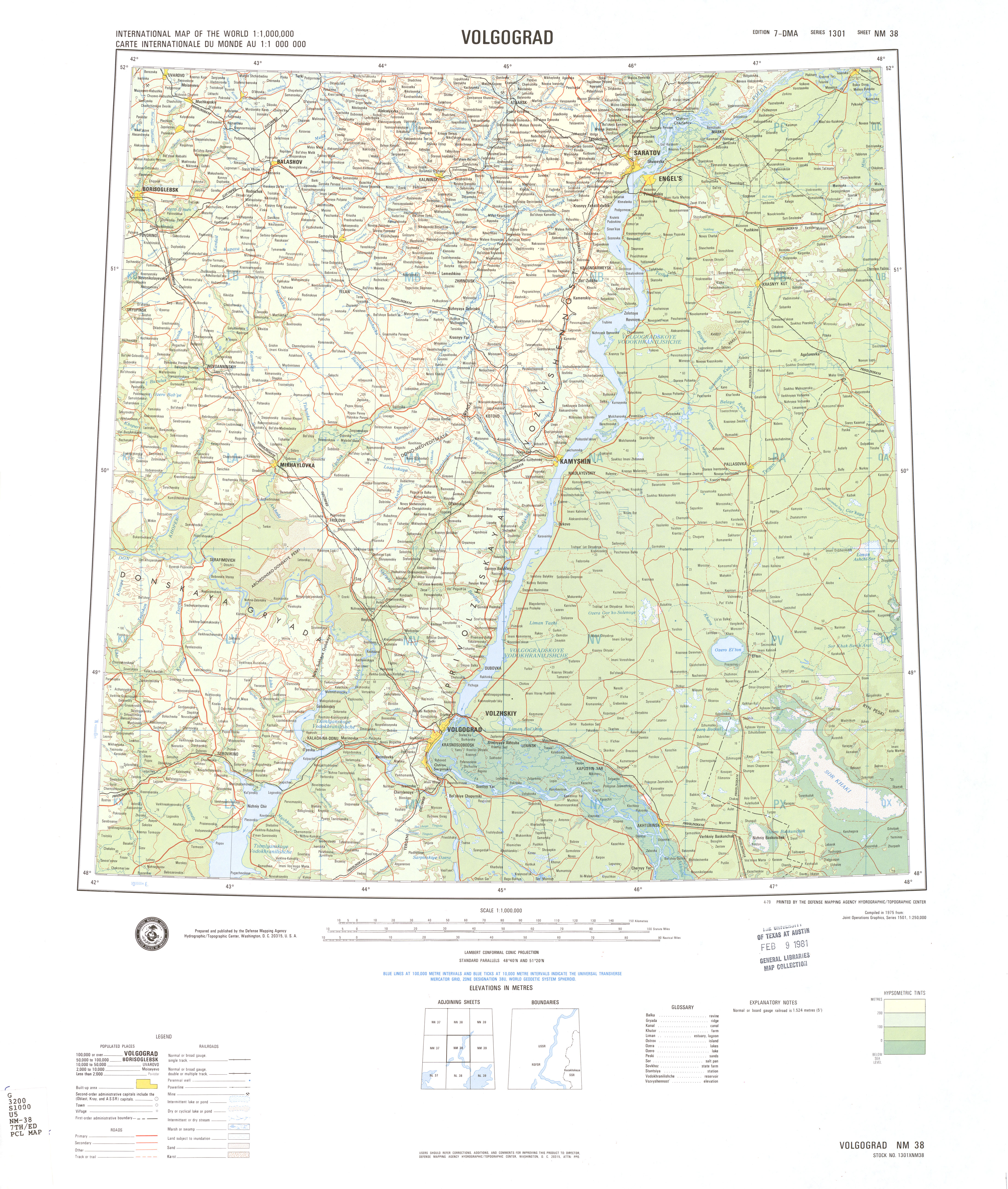

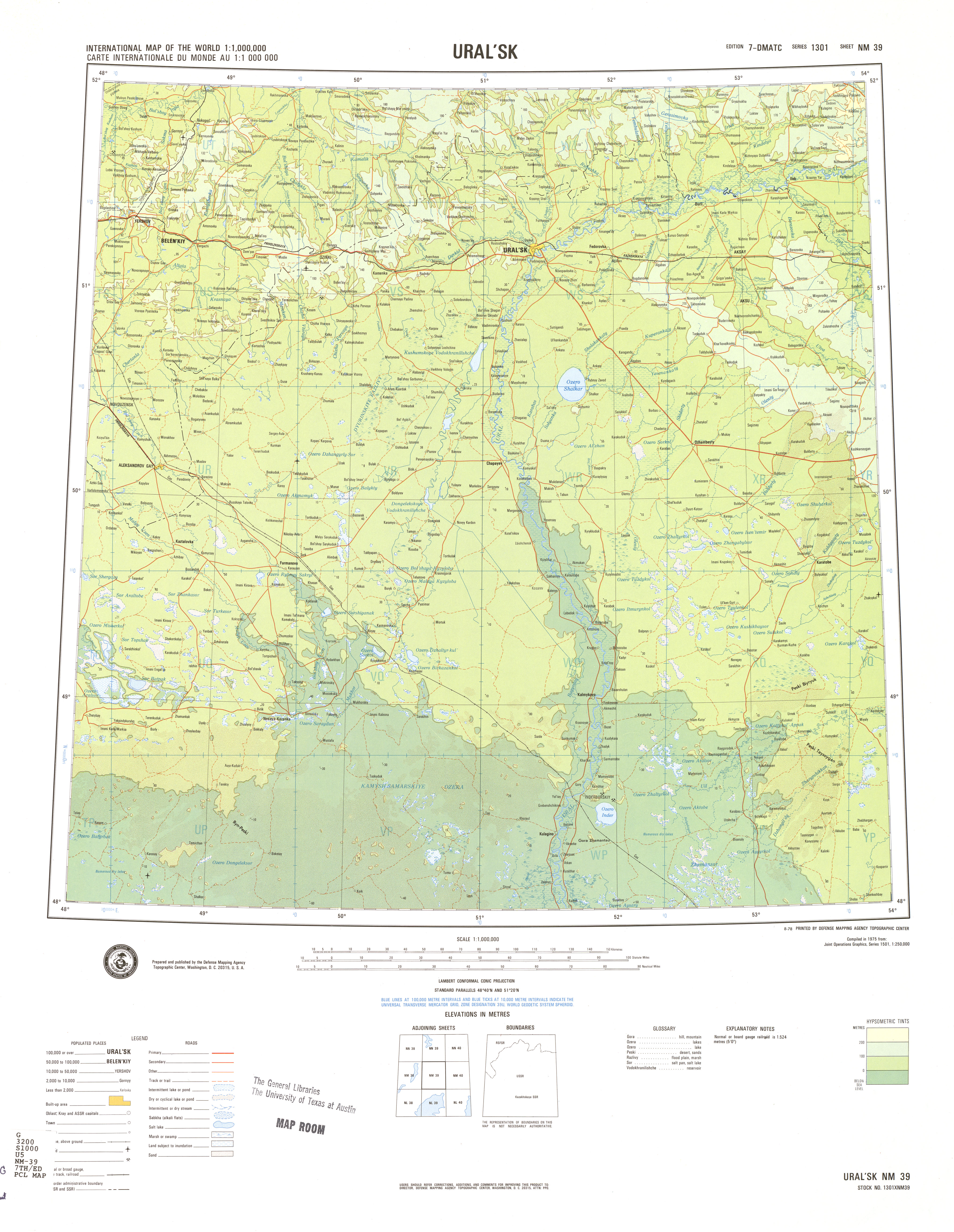

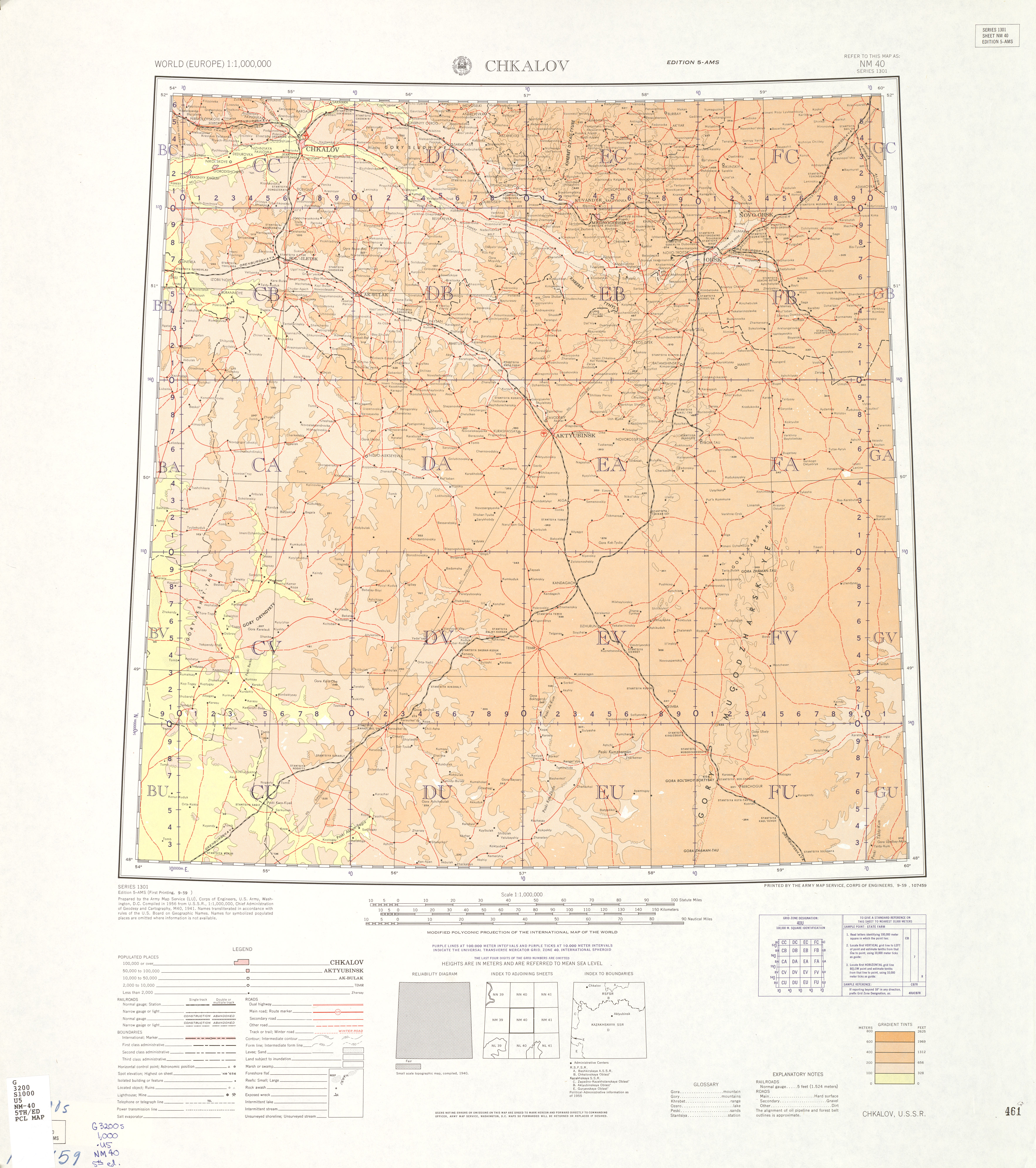

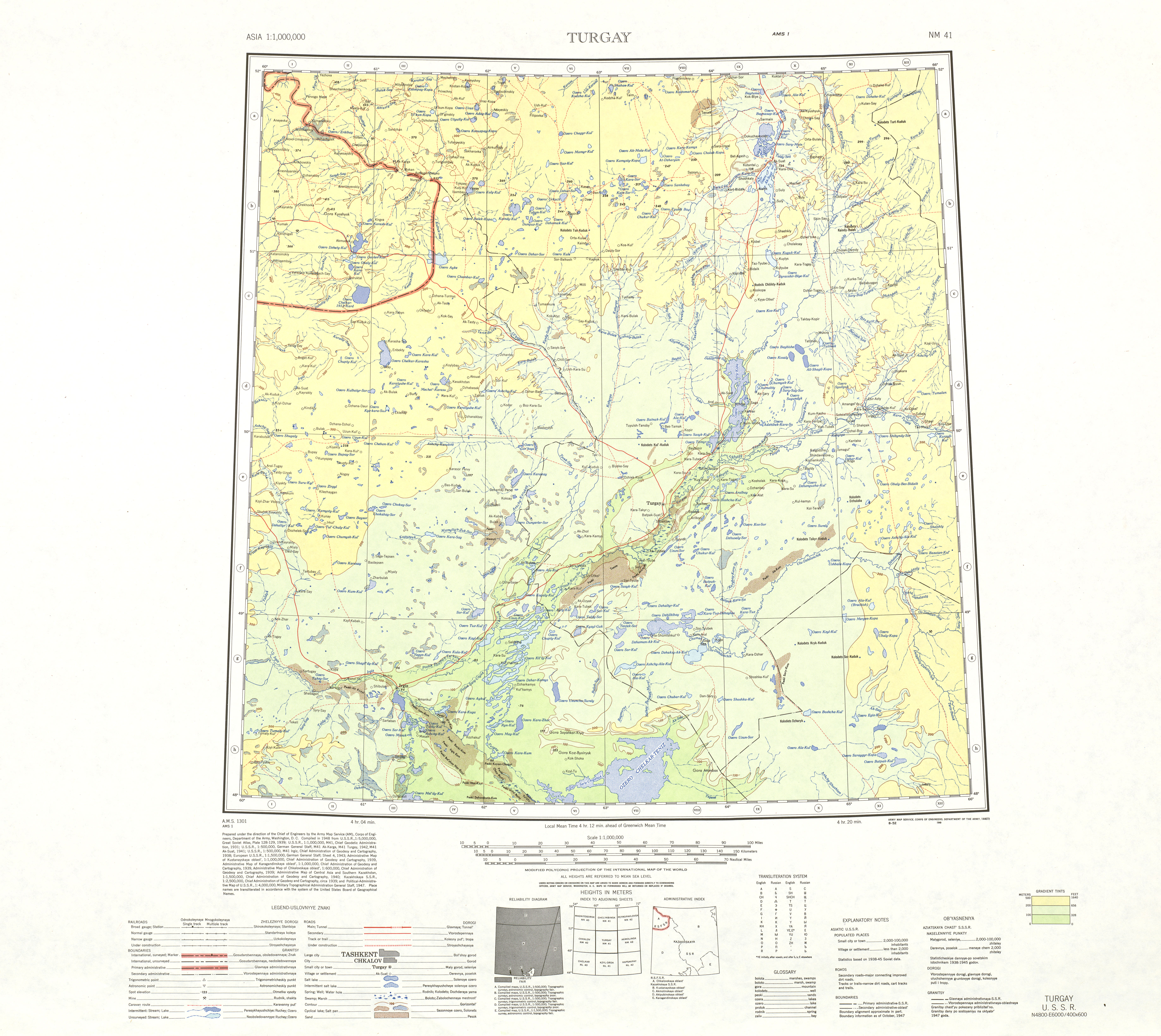

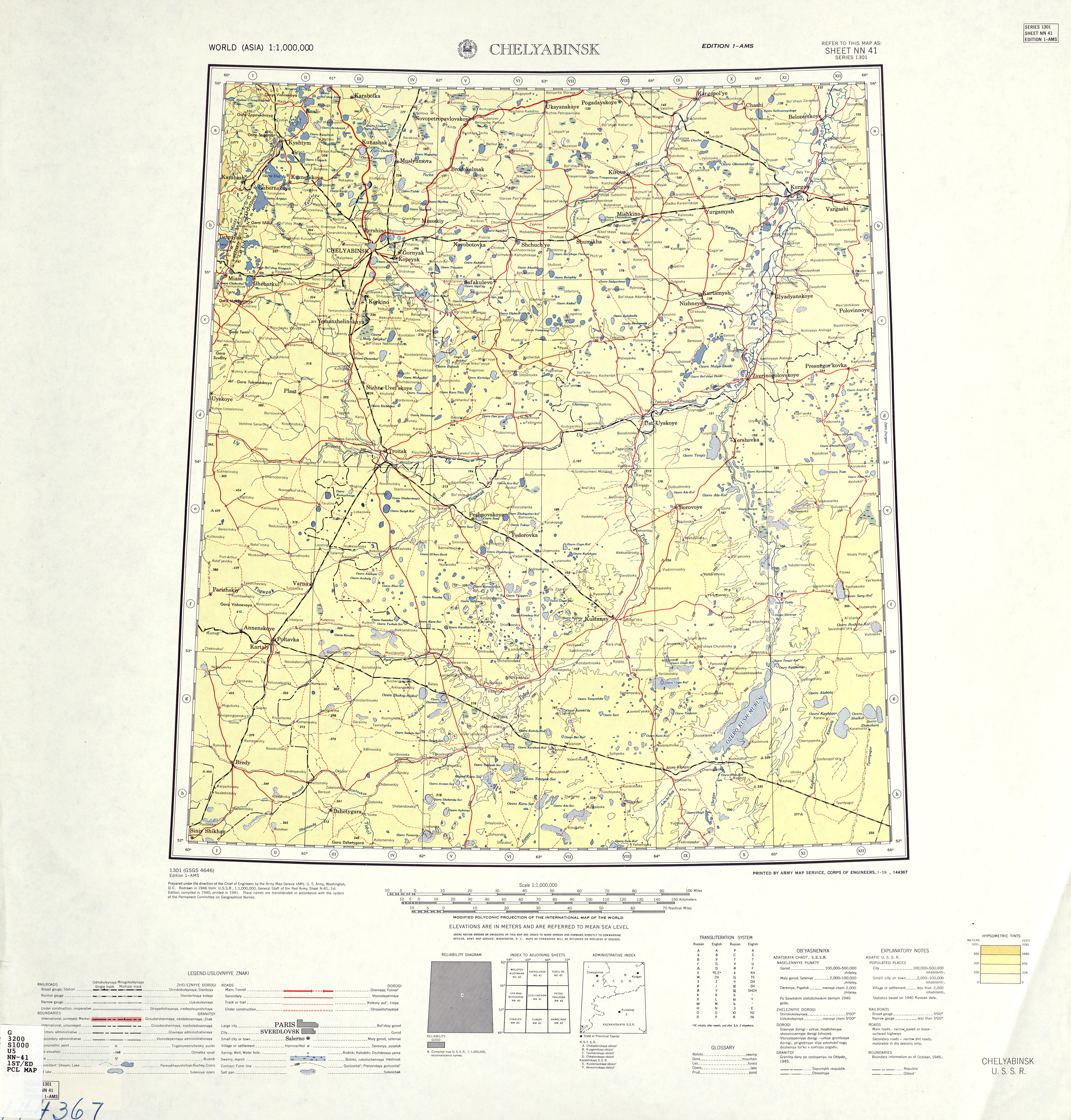

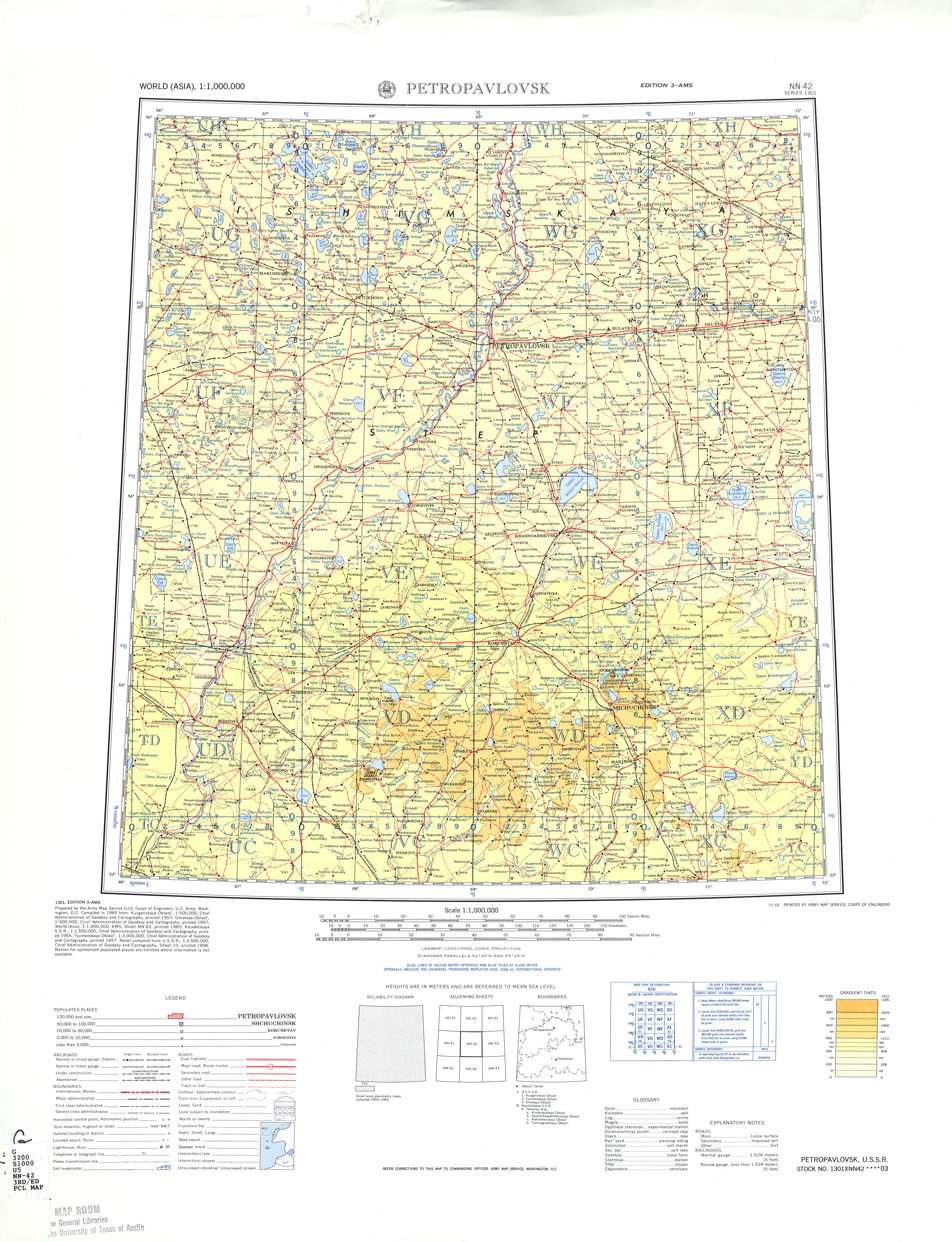

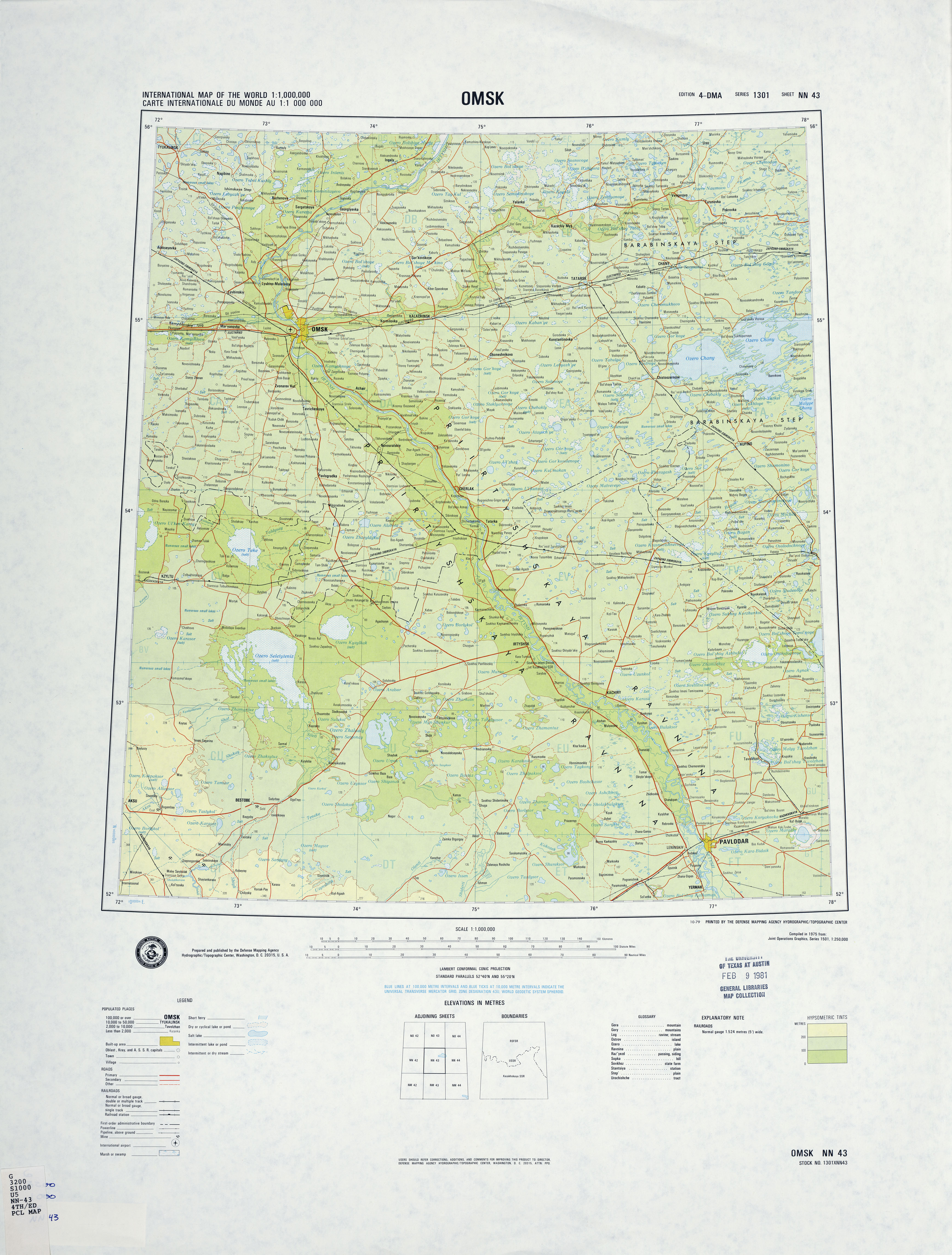

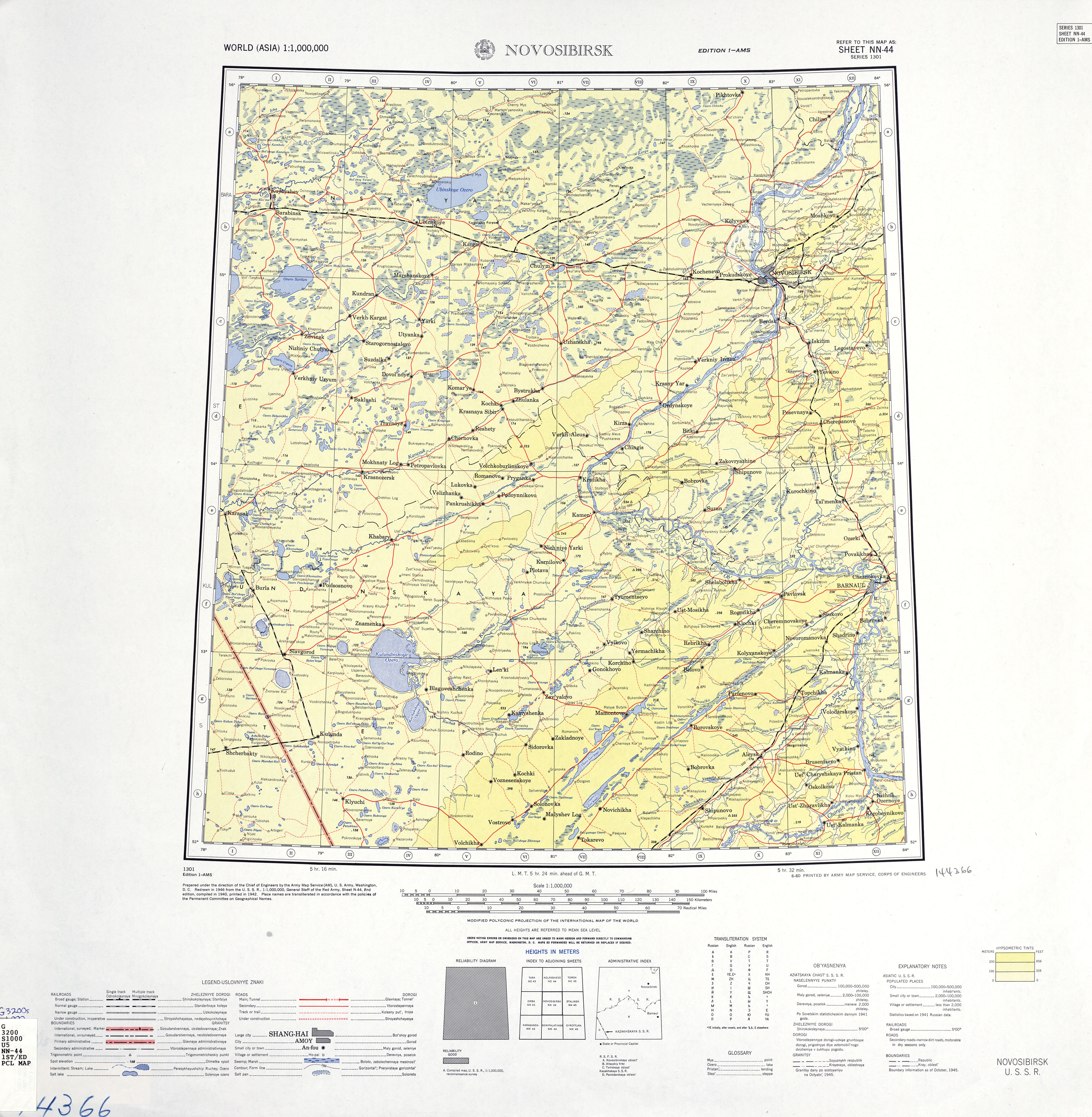

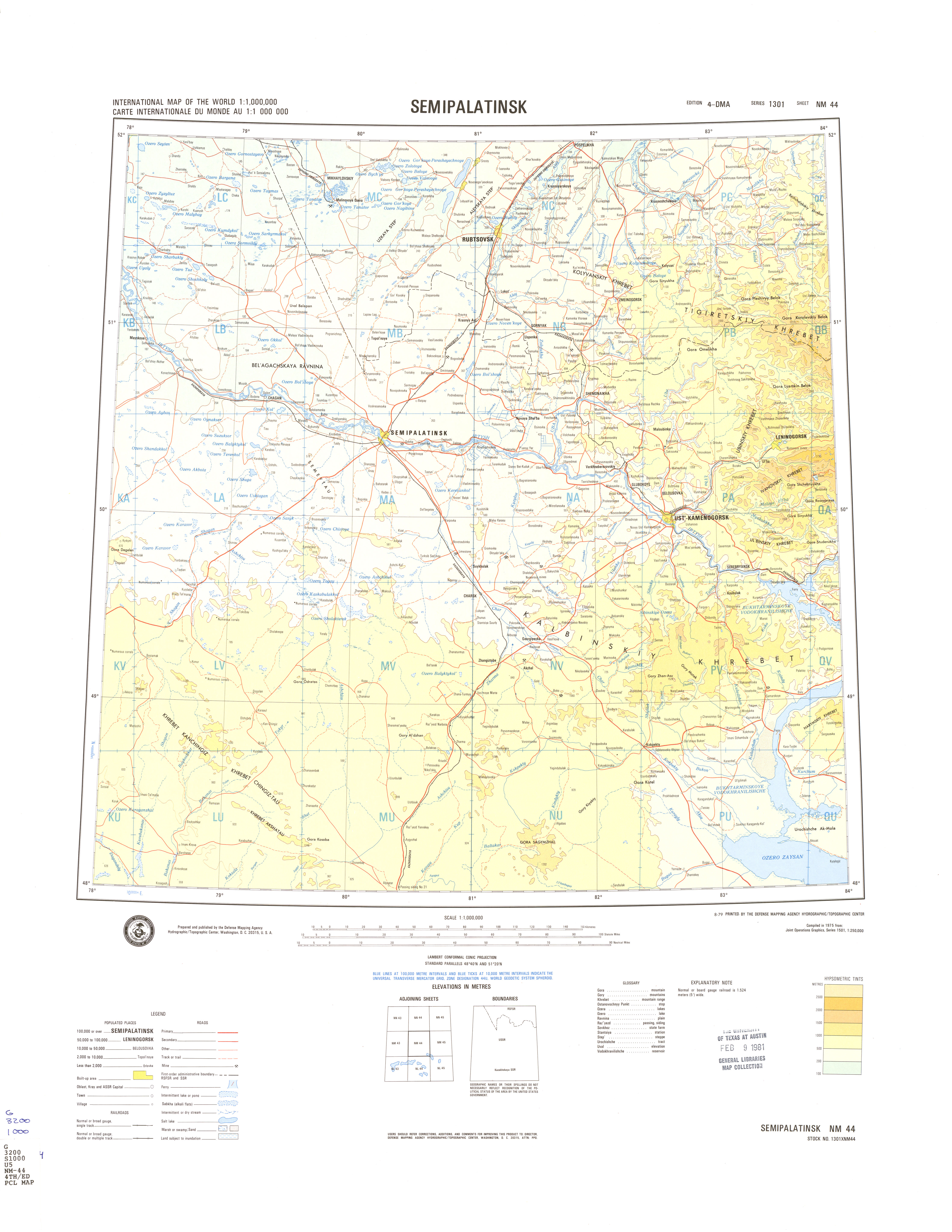

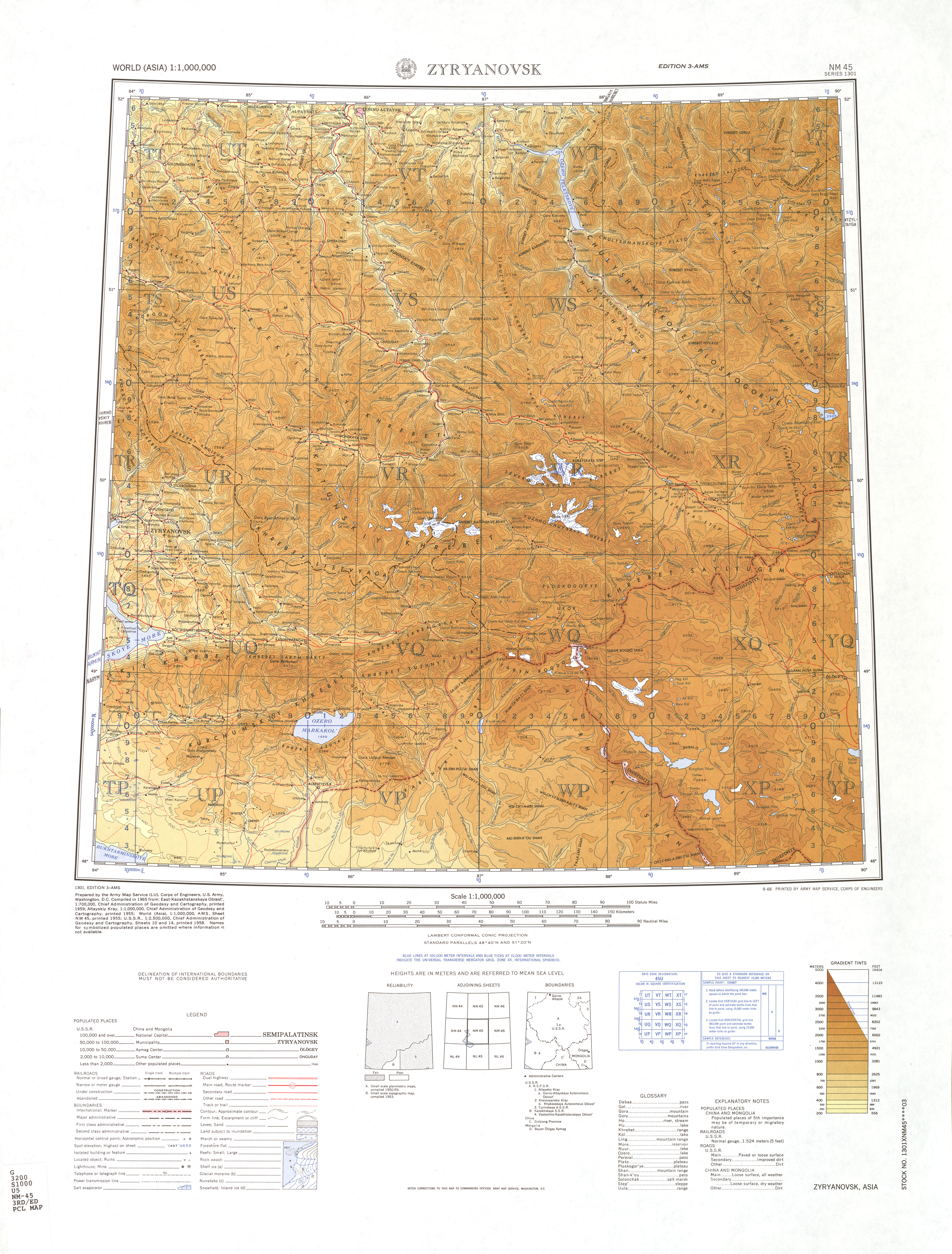
includes tripoint with China

== Demographics ==
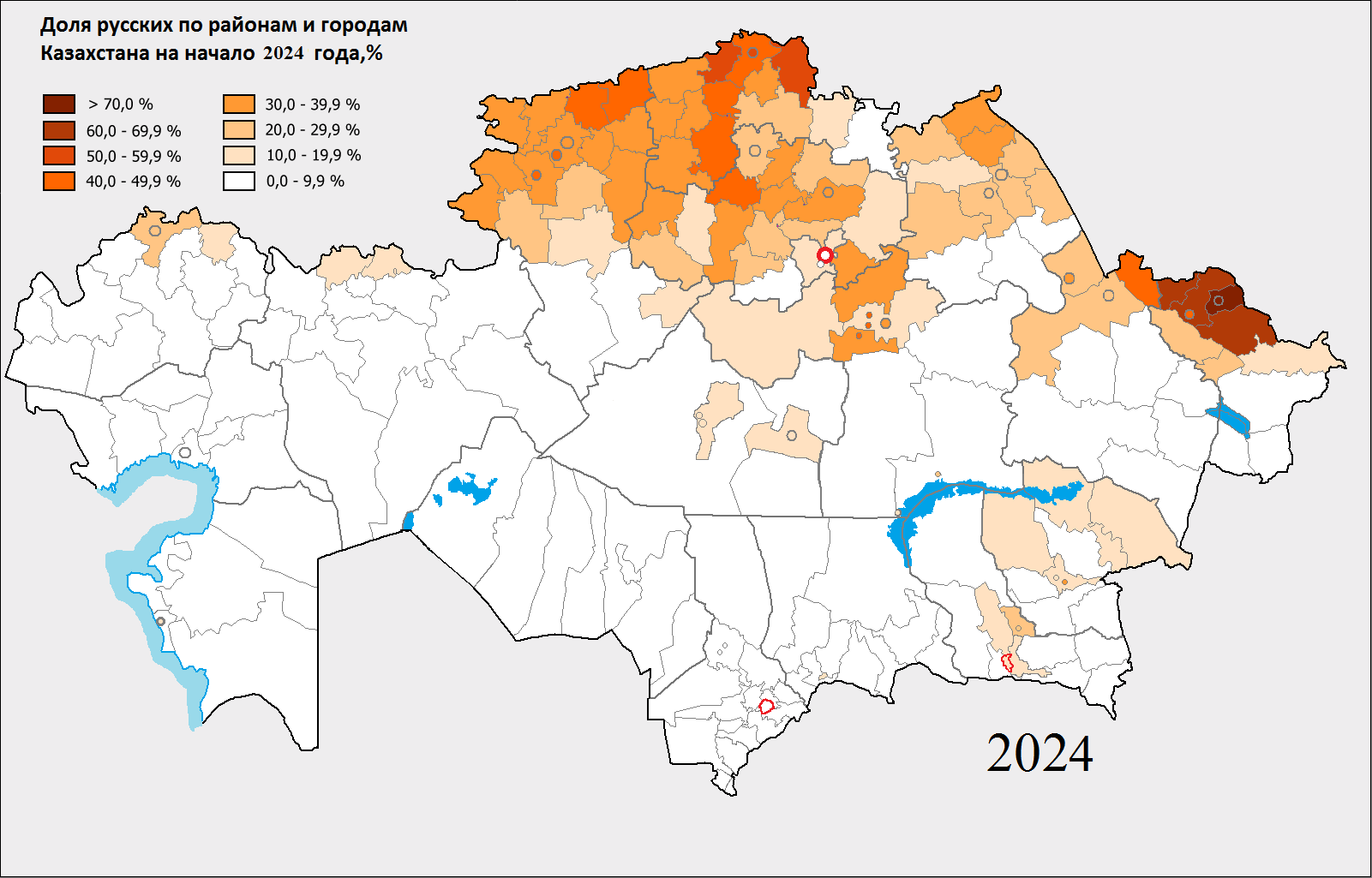
The share of Russians by districts and cities of regional and republican subordination Kazakhstan in 2021

== See also ==
- Kazakhstan–Russia relations
