= Akbulak, Russia =

Akbulak Акбулак
- Selo
- Interactive map of Akbulak
- Location of Akbulak Akbulak (Orenburg Oblast)
- Coordinates: 51°00′16″N 55°37′14″E
- Country: Russia
- Federal subject: Orenburg Oblast
- Administrative district: Akbulaksky District
- SettlementSelsoviet: Akbulak Settlement
- Founded: 1904

Population (2010 Census)
  - Total: 13,918
  - Estimate (2021): 10,688 (−23.2%)

Administrative status
  - Capital of: Akbulaksky District, Akbulak Settlement

Municipal status
  - Municipal district: Akbulaksky Municipal District
  - Rural settlement: Akbulaksky Possovet Rural Settlement
  - Capital of: Akbulaksky Municipal District, Akbulaksky Possovet Rural Settlement
- Time zone: UTC+5 (MSK+2)
- Postal code: 461550–461551
- OKTMO ID: 53605401101

Akbulak (Russian: Акбулак) is a rural locality (a settlement) and the administrative center of Akbulaksky District of Orenburg Oblast, Russia. Population: 13,918 (2010 census); 14,801 (2002 census); 13,152 (1989 Soviet census).
