= Pskovsky (rural locality) =

Pskovsky (Russian: Пско́вский; masculine), Pskovskaya (Пско́вская; feminine), or Pskovskoye (Пско́вское; neuter) is the name of several rural localities in Russia:

- Pskovskoye, Belgorod Oblast, a selo in Vengerovsky Rural Okrug of Rakityansky District of Belgorod Oblast
- Pskovskoye, Krasnoznamensky District, Kaliningrad Oblast, a settlement in Dobrovolsky Rural Okrug of Krasnoznamensky District of Kaliningrad Oblast
- Pskovskoye, Gavrilovsky Rural Okrug, Ozyorsky District, Kaliningrad Oblast, two settlements in Gavrilovsky Rural Okrug of Ozyorsky District of Kaliningrad Oblast
