= Marfino, Astrakhan Oblast =

Marfino Марфино
- Selo
- Location within Astrakhan Oblast Location within Russia
- Coordinates: 46°24′N 48°43′E
- Country: Russia
- Region: Astrakhan Oblast
- District: Volodarsky District
- Time zone: UTC+4:00

Marfino (Russian: Марфино) is a rural locality (a selo) and the administrative center of Marfinsky Selsoviet of Volodarsky District, Astrakhan Oblast, Russia. The population was 3,268 as of 2010. There are 62 streets.

== Geography ==
Marfino is located 16 km (9.9 mi) east of Volodarsky (the district's administrative centre) by road. Kudrino is the nearest rural locality.
