= Zhaman Sarysu =

River in Kazakhstan

Zhaman Sarysu Жаман Сарысу
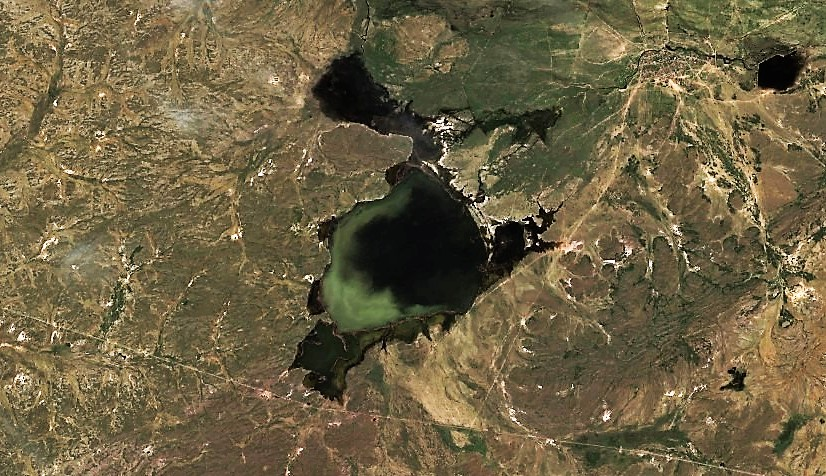
- Sentinel-2 picture of the river (upper right) and Koktinkoli lake (below).

- Mouth location in Kazakhstan

Location
- Country: Kazakhstan

Physical characteristics
- Source: Zhaksy Tagyly; Kazakh Uplands
  - coordinates: 48°24′14″N 72°16′24″E
  - elevation: ca 900 m (3,000 ft)
- Mouth: Sarysu
  - coordinates: 48°40′27″N 71°35′45″E
  - elevation: 475 m (1,558 ft)
- Length: 155 km (96 mi)
- Basin size: 9,200 km^{2} (3,600 sq mi)
- Discharge
  - average: 0.6 m^{3}/s (21 cu ft/s)

Basin features
- Progression: Sarysu→Telikol→Shieli-Telikol Canal→Syr Darya→Aral Sea

The Zhaman Sarysu (Kazakh: Жаман Сарысу) is a river in the Zhanaarka District, Ulytau Region, and Shet District, Karaganda Region, Kazakhstan. It has a length of 155 km (96 mi) and a drainage basin of 9,200 km^{2} (3,600 sq mi).

It is one of the most important tributaries of the Sarysu. The city of Zhanaarka is located 1 km (0.62 mi) to the east of the mouth of the river. The valley is used as pasture for local cattle.

== Course ==
The Zhaman Sarysu river originates in the southern slopes of the Zhaksy Tagyly massif of the Kazakh Uplands, with some rivulets flowing from the Shetshok and Baynazar mountains. In its upper course it heads first southwestwards within a channel bound by steep cliffs. After it leaves the mountain area it bends roughly westwards and its channel gradually widens reaching a width between 100 m (330 ft)s and 200 m (660 ft). The Zhaman Sarysu flows within a floodplain in that direction until it enters lake Koktinkoli from the northeast. Then the river flows out of the lake from the northern end and heads northwestwards. Towards the end of its lower course the Zhaman Sarysu bends westwards and flows along the southern outskirts of Zhanaarka city, the district capital. Finally it joins the left bank of the Sarysu about 1 km (0.62 mi) downriver from Zhanaarka and a little further east from the mouth of the Taldymanaka.

River Zhaman Sarysu is fed by snow and groundwater. Its highest level is usually in April. By August the river barely flows. The water of the river is salty. Its main tributaries are the Kurmanaka, Zhamanozek, Karaganda, Kairakty and Suluaysa.

== See also ==
- List of rivers of Kazakhstan
