= Atasu (river) =

River in Kazakhstan

Atasu Атасу
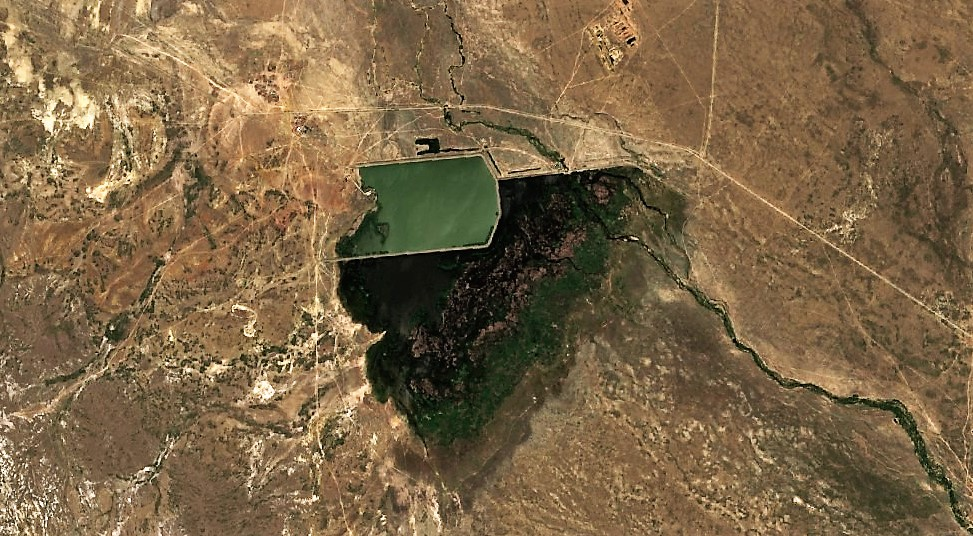
- Sentinel-2 picture of the Kylysh reservoir

- Mouth location in Kazakhstan

Location
- Country: Kazakhstan

Physical characteristics
- Source: Uzynzhal; Kazakh Uplands
  - coordinates: 47°49′01″N 72°23′30″E
  - elevation: ca 1,000 m (3,300 ft)
- Mouth: Sarysu
  - coordinates: 48°30′29″N 70°57′46″E
  - elevation: 432 m (1,417 ft)
- Length: 177 km (110 mi)
- Basin size: 5,920 km^{2} (2,290 sq mi)
- Discharge
  - average: 0.66 m^{3}/s (23 cu ft/s) (near the mouth)

Basin features
- Progression: Sarysu→Telikol→Shieli-Telikol Canal→Syr Darya→Aral Sea

The Atasu (Kazakh: Атасу) is a river in the Zhanaarka District, Ulytau Region, and Shet District, Karaganda Region, Kazakhstan. It has a length of 177 km (110 mi) and a drainage basin of 5,920 km^{2} (2,290 sq mi).

It is one of the most important tributaries of the Sarysu. The city of Karazhal is located near the river. The Kylysh (Қылыш) reservoir was built at the time of the Kazakh SSR close to Kylysh village, 17 km (11 mi) to the ESE of the town.

== Course ==
The Atasu river originates in the Uzynzhal massif of the Kazakh Uplands. Its source is in a spring near Kyzyltau. It heads at first westwards in its upper course across Shet District. After it leaves the mountain area it bends roughly northwestwards, already in Zhanaarka District, and flows in that direction until a little to the east of Karazhal, where it bends northwards. Towards the end of its lower course the Atasu flows within a floodplain, where it divides into separate channels and most of its water is drawn for irrigating nearby fields. Finally it joins the left bank of the Sarysu over 50 km (31 mi) downriver from Zhanaarka, the district capital, and a little further west from the mouth of the Taldymanaka.

River Atasu is fed mainly by snow and its highest level is usually in April and May. By the summer it barely flows, splitting into separate pools. Its main tributaries are the Bylkyldak, Karakoga, Karkymbay, Isabek Karasuy and Boranbay.

== See also ==
- List of rivers of Kazakhstan
