= Taldymanaka =

River in Kazakhstan

Taldymanaka Талдыманақа
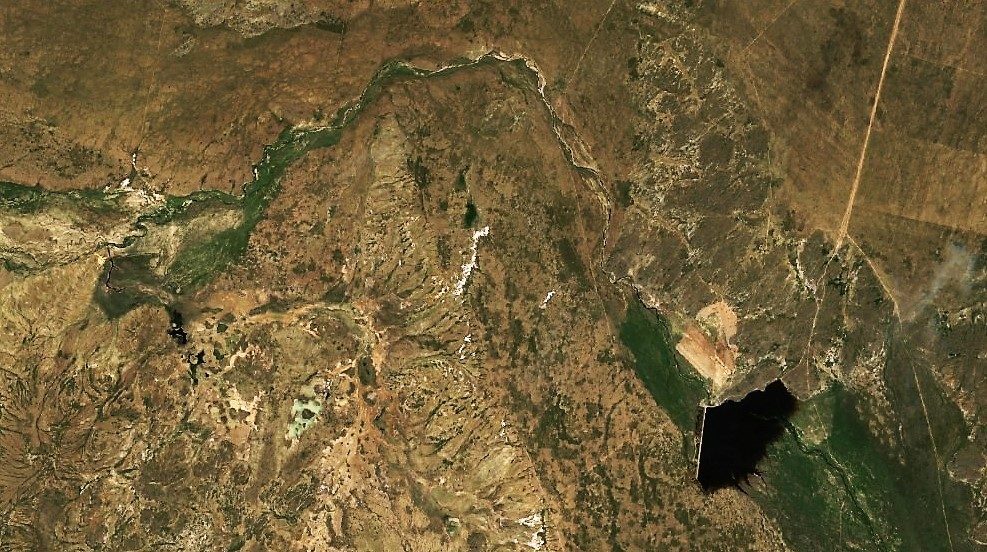
- Sentinel-2 picture of the big bend in the Taldymanaka (above) and reservoir in the middle course of the river (below right).

- Mouth location in Kazakhstan

Location
- Country: Kazakhstan

Physical characteristics
- Source: Aktau; Kazakh Uplands
  - coordinates: 47°50′12″N 71°40′40″E
  - elevation: ca 1,100 m (3,600 ft)
- Mouth: Sarysu
  - location: near Mount Tokti
  - coordinates: 48°30′50″N 70°59′00″E
  - elevation: 434 m (1,424 ft)
- Length: 158 km (98 mi)
- Basin size: 3,950 km^{2} (1,530 sq mi)
- Discharge
  - average: 0.25 m^{3}/s (8.8 cu ft/s)

Basin features
- Progression: Sarysu→Telikol→Shieli-Telikol Canal→Syr Darya→Aral Sea

The Taldymanaka (Kazakh: Талдыманақа; Russian: Талдыманака) or Taldy-Manaka is a river in Zhanaarka District, Ulytau Region, Kazakhstan. It has a length of 158 km (98 mi) and a drainage basin of 3,950 km^{2} (1,530 sq mi).

This river is one of the most important tributaries of the Sarysu. The city of Zhanaarka is located 50 km (31 mi) to the ENE of the mouth of the Taldymanaka. The water of the river is fresh upstream from the big bend. It is used for drinking purposes and watering livestock.

== Course ==
The Taldymanaka originates in springs of the southern slopes of the Aktau massif of the Kazakh Uplands. It heads northwards in its upper course as a mountain river within a 300 m (980 ft) to 400 m (1,300 ft) wide valley bound by steep cliffs. After it leaves the mountain area it flows within a floodplain among agricultural fields where a reservoir has been built recently. Further north it makes a wide bend northwestwards, westwards and southwestwards, heading then roughly westwards all along its lower course. In its last stretch the Taldymanaka flows again within a floodplain, where there are a number of salt lakes, especially to the south. Finally it joins the left bank of the Sarysu a little further upriver from the mouth of the Atasu.

River Taldymanaka is fed mainly by snow and rainwater. Its highest level is usually in the spring with the melting of the snow in the steppe. By the summer it stops flowing, splitting into separate pools. Its main tributaries are the Zaimka, Uzen, Sulumanaka and Kokpekti.

== See also ==
- List of rivers of Kazakhstan
