= Saryozen (Sarysu basin) =

River in Kazakhstan

Saryozen Сарыөзен
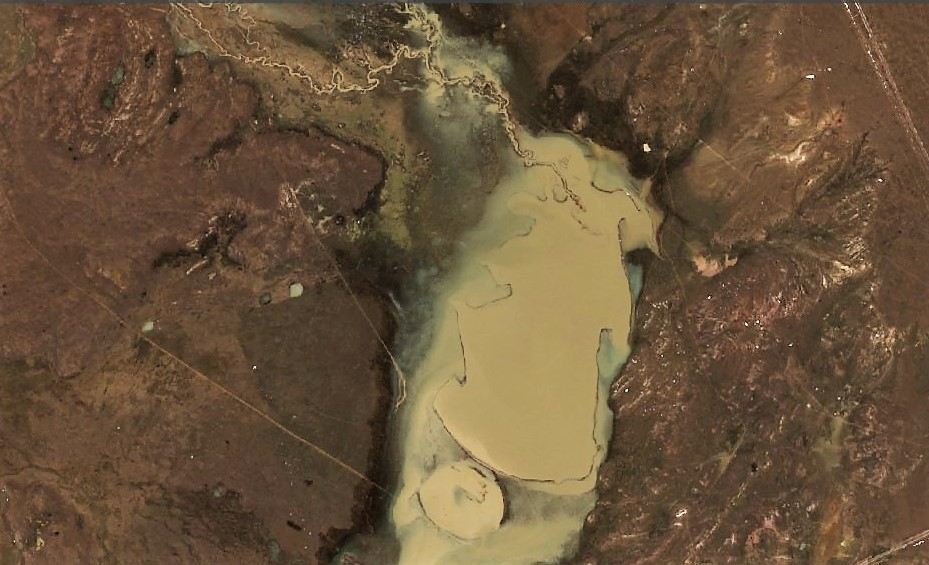
- The Saryozen river flooding lake Kabyrshakty in the spring.

- Mouth location in Kazakhstan

Physical characteristics
- Source: Kazakh Uplands
  - location: South of Tikenekti
  - coordinates: 49°01′14″N 69°20′29″E
- Mouth: Kabyrshakty
  - coordinates: 48°21′10″N 69°31′54″E
  - elevation: 354 metres (1,161 ft)
- Length: 100 km (62 mi)
- Basin size: 1,490 km^{2} (580 sq mi)

The Saryozen (Kazakh: Сарыөзен) is a river in the Zhanaarka District of Ulytau Region, Kazakhstan. The river is 100 km (62 mi) long and the area of its basin is 1,490 km^{2} (580 sq mi).

== Geography ==
The basin of the Saryozen is endorheic, belonging to the wider Sarysu basin. The river has its sources in springs located to the south of Tikenekti village, Nura District. It heads roughly southwards all along its course. In its last stretch the Saryozen bends southeastwards and finally it ends in the northern shore of the Kabyrshakty, a salt lake.

== See also ==
- List of rivers of Kazakhstan
