= Koktinkoli =

Lake in Kazakhstan

- Көктіңкөлі
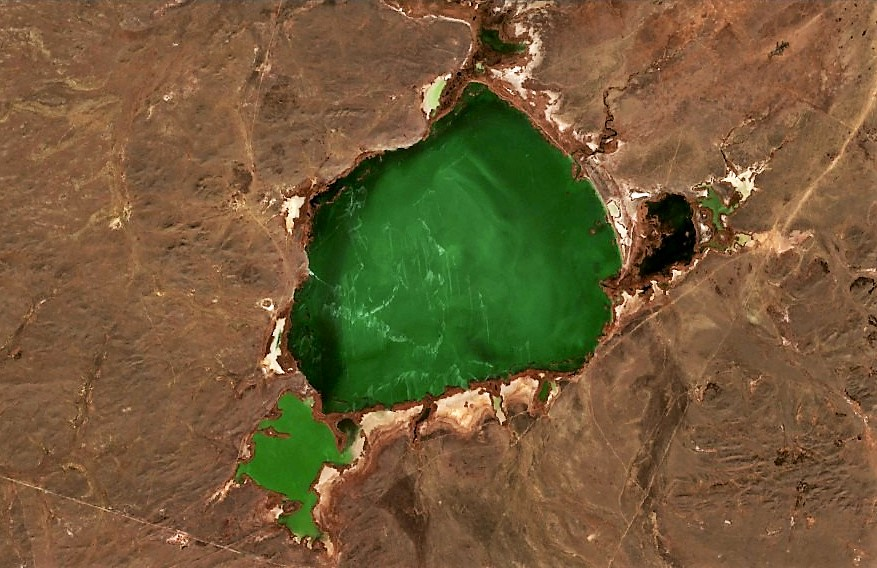
- Sentinel-2 image of the lake in early November

- Location within Kazakhstan
- Location: Kazakh Uplands
- Coordinates: 48°31′11″N 72°06′15″E
- Type: exorheic
- Primary inflows: Zhaman Sarysu
- Primary outflows: Zhaman Sarysu
- Catchment area: 2,584 square kilometers (998 sq mi)
- Basin countries: Kazakhstan
- Max. length: 5.3 kilometers (3.3 mi)
- Max. width: 3.4 kilometers (2.1 mi)
- Surface area: 12.7 square kilometers (4.9 sq mi)
- Average depth: 1.1 meters (3 ft 7 in)
- Max. depth: 2.5 meters (8 ft 2 in)
- Water volume: 0.013 cubic kilometers (0.0031 cu mi)
- Residence time: UTC+6
- Shore length^{1}: 14 kilometers (8.7 mi)
- Surface elevation: 540 meters (1,770 ft)
- Settlements: Koktinkoli station
- ^{1} Shore length is not a well-defined measure.

Koktinkoli (Kazakh: Көктіңкөлі; Russian: Коктинколи) is a lake in Shet District, Karaganda Region, Kazakhstan.

Zhanaarka, former Atasu, is located 35 kilometers (22 mi) to the northwest of the lake, and Koktinkoli station 5 kilometers (3.1 mi) to the northeast of the northern lakeshore. The border with Ulytau Region lies 6 kilometers (3.7 mi) to the west of the western lakeshore.

== Geography ==
Koktinkoli is an exorheic lake in the Sarysu basin. River Zhaman Sarysu flows into the lake from the northeast and flows out of it from the north. The lake is roughly triangular-shaped, with its vertex in the north. The western shore is steep, lined with cliffs up to 2 meters (6 ft 7 in) high, and consists of gray sandstone mixed with clay. The remaining stretches of the lakeshore are flat and clayey. An earthen dam was built to regulate the water level at the northern and northeastern end, where the river flows in and out. Lake Shoshkakol lies 120 kilometers (75 mi) to the northwest.

The lake freezes in November and stays under ice until April. Koktinkoli does not dry in the summer, but its level fluctuates around 1.5 meters (4 ft 11 in) yearly, depending on the inflow of river Zhaman Sarysu. The lake water is hard and slightly saline, with a mineralization of 4.2 grams per liter (0.67 oz/imp gal).

== Flora and fauna ==
The lake is surrounded by highland steppe. Reeds cover some stretches of the lakeshore. Sedges, wormwood, fescue and feathergrass grow near the banks. Among the fishes living in the lake, the crucian carp, perch, bream and pike deserve mention.

== See also ==
- List of lakes of Kazakhstan
