= Meshkeysor =

Lake in Kazakhstan

- Мешкейсор
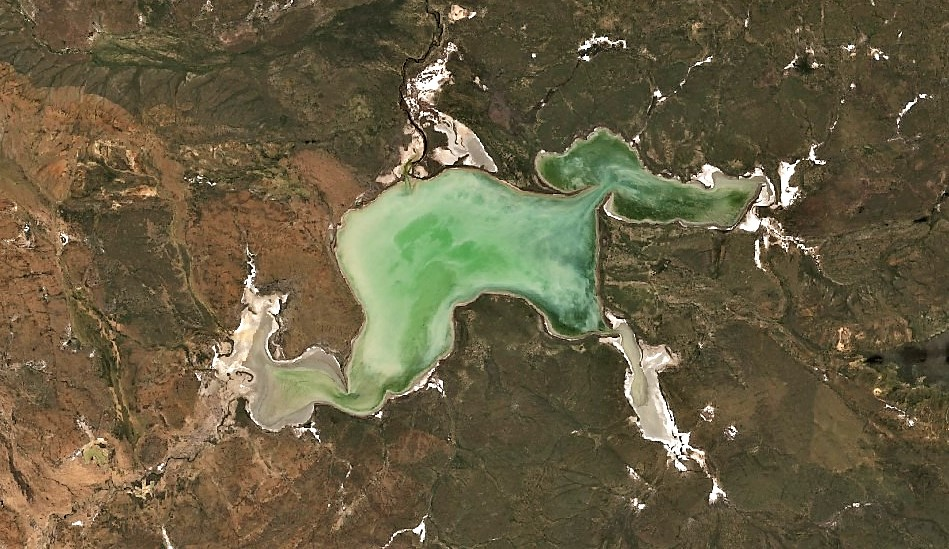
- Sentinel-2 image of the lake in May

- Location within Kazakhstan
- Location: Kazakh Uplands
- Coordinates: 48°41′06″N 68°41′54″E
- Type: endorheic
- Primary inflows: yes
- Primary outflows: none
- Basin countries: Kazakhstan
- Max. length: 9.5 kilometers (5.9 mi)
- Max. width: 4.2 kilometers (2.6 mi)
- Surface area: 33 square kilometers (13 sq mi)
- Residence time: UTC+6
- Surface elevation: 424 meters (1,391 ft)

Meshkeysor (Kazakh and Russian: Мешкейсор) is a salt lake in Ulytau District, Ulytau Region, Kazakhstan.

Abilzhappas (Kazakh: Әбілжаппас), a wintering settlement (Kystau) of Kazakh herders, is located 10 kilometers (6.2 mi) to the northeast of the northern lakeshore.

== Geography ==
Meshkeysor is an endorheic lake in the Sarysu basin. The lake has a sinuous shape stretching roughly from east to west, surrounded by salt pans. The lake lies in the middle of the Meshkeysor region, a vast 8,100 square kilometers (3,100 sq mi) area characterized by flat valleys and "melkosopochnik" low hills. The altitude of this region lies between 400 meters (1,300 ft) and 500 meters (1,600 ft). It is limited by rivers Sary-Kengyr and Sarysu.

Lake Meshkeysor is located at the center in a trough of saline young soils and salt marshes. Karasor, a smaller lake, lies 16 kilometers (9.9 mi) to the SSE, and a very large reddish sor 15 kilometers (9.3 mi) to the northeast. Lake Kabyrshakty lies 66 kilometers (41 mi) to the southeast.

Meshkeysor freezes in November and stays under ice until April. It fills during the spring thaw with a river flowing from the north and another flowing from the southwest. The lake usually dries completely during summer droughts.

== Flora and fauna ==
The steppe vegetation of the area is characterized by wormwood and fescue, with junegrass and feathergrass in the banks and higher grounds. In drainless troughs with saline soil there is only wormwood and saltwort. The lake basin is a seasonal grazing ground for local cattle.

== See also ==
- Kazakh semi-desert
- List of lakes of Kazakhstan
