= Kabyrshakty =

Lake in Kazakhstan

- Қабыршақты
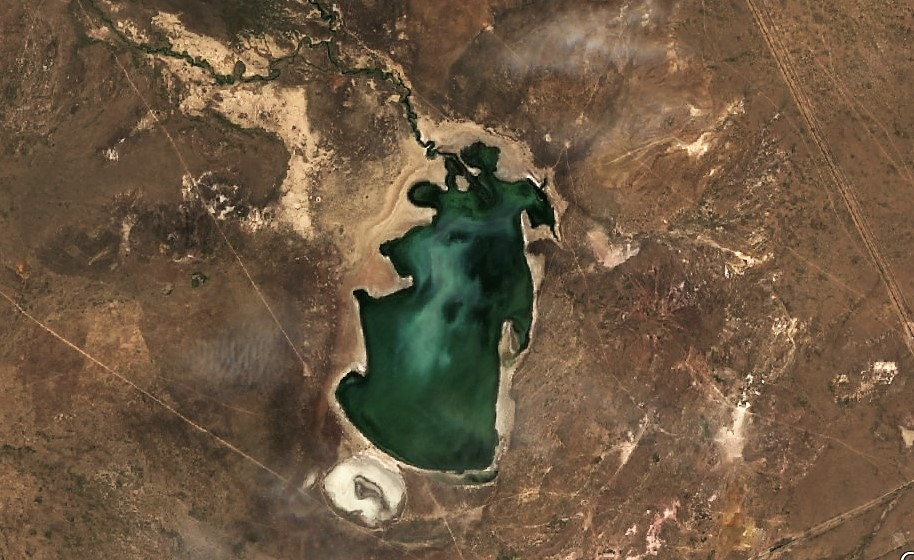
- Sentinel-2 image of Kabyrshakty lake

- Location within Kazakhstan
- Coordinates: 48°20′13″N 69°31′24″E
- Type: endorheic
- Primary inflows: Saryozen
- Primary outflows: none
- Catchment area: 916 square kilometers (354 sq mi)
- Basin countries: Kazakhstan
- Max. length: 4.1 kilometers (2.5 mi)
- Max. width: 2.3 kilometers (1.4 mi)
- Surface area: 5.8 square kilometers (2.2 sq mi)
- Average depth: 1.3 meters (4 ft 3 in)
- Residence time: UTC+6
- Shore length^{1}: 14 kilometers (8.7 mi)
- Surface elevation: 354 meters (1,161 ft)
- ^{1} Shore length is not a well-defined measure.

Kabyrshakty (Kazakh: Қабыршақты; Russian: Кабыршакты) is a salt lake in Zhanaarka District, Ulytau Region, Kazakhstan.

The A17 Highway passes close to the southern lakeshore. The lake basin is a seasonal grazing ground for local cattle.

== Geography ==
Kabyrshakty is an endorheic lake in the Sarysu basin. The lake is elongated, stretching roughly from north to south. The coast is flat, indented in the northern, eastern and western sides. Reeds grow on the shores of the lake. There is a separate small lake close to the southern shore. Lake Meshkeysor lies 66 kilometers (41 mi) to the northwest.

The lake freezes in November and stays under ice until April. It fills during the spring thaw with river Saryozen flowing into it from the north and flooding it in years of abundant snowfall. Kabyrshakty may dry completely during severe droughts in the summer.

== See also ==
- Kazakh semi-desert
- List of lakes of Kazakhstan
