= Karakengir =

River in Kazakhstan

Karakengir Қаракеңгір
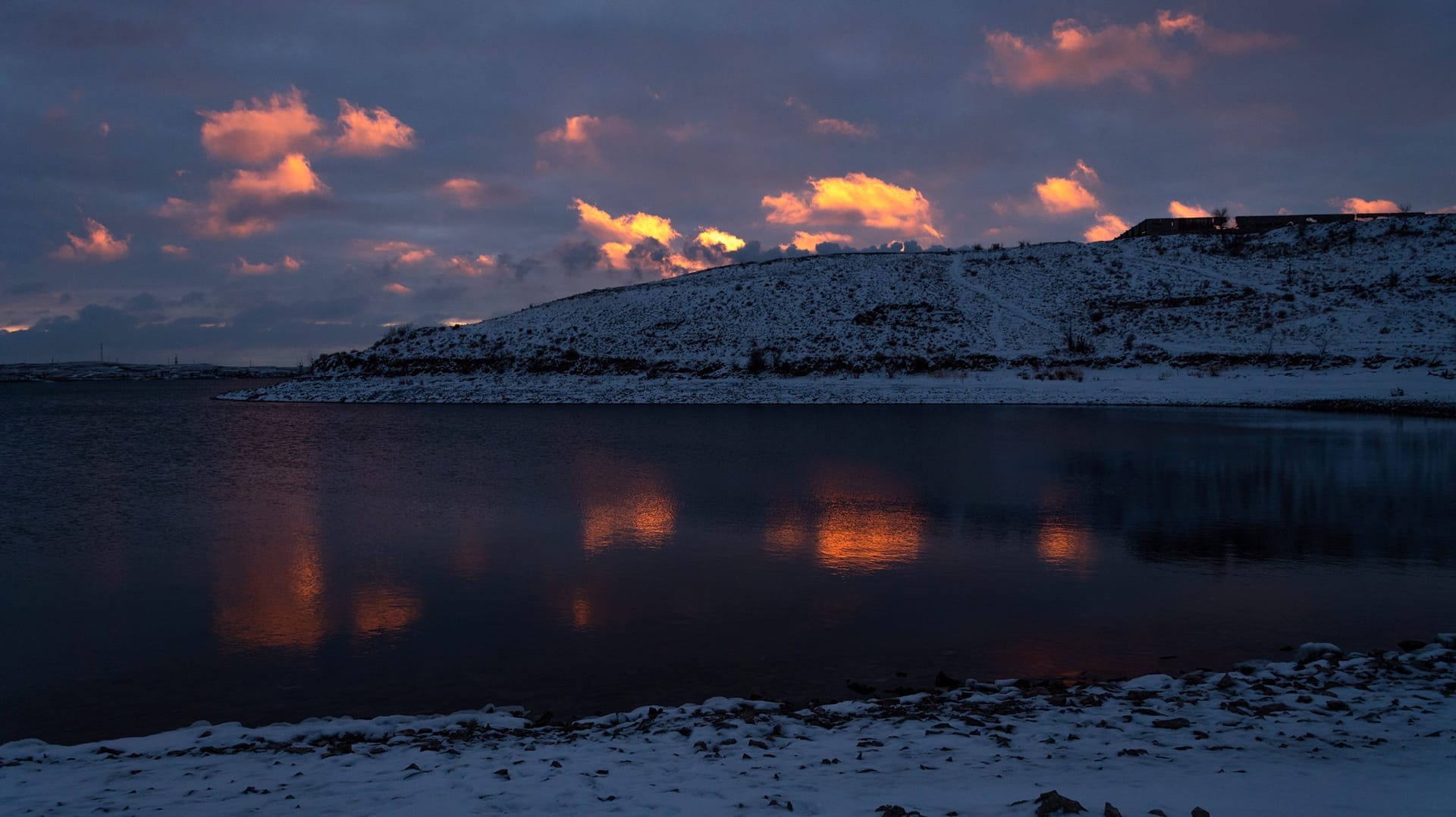
- Panorama of the Kengir reservoir

- Mouth location in Kazakhstan

Location
- Country: Kazakhstan

Physical characteristics
- Source: Zhaksy Arganaty; Ulytau
  - coordinates: 49°17′20″N 67°24′38″E
  - elevation: ca 600 m (2,000 ft)
- Mouth: Sarysu
  - coordinates: 47°22′42″N 67°59′29″E
  - elevation: 340 m (1,120 ft)
- Length: 295 km (183 mi)
- Basin size: 18,400 km^{2} (7,100 sq mi)
- Discharge
  - average: 3.51 m^{3}/s (124 cu ft/s) (near the mouth)

Basin features
- Progression: Sarysu→Telikol→Shieli-Telikol Canal→Syr Darya→Aral Sea

The Karakengir (Kazakh: Қаракеңгір; Russian: Кара-Кенгир), also known as Kengir, is a river in the Ulytau District, Ulytau Region, [ Kazakhstan. It has a length of 295 km (183 mi) and a drainage basin of 18,400 km^{2} (7,100 sq mi).

It is one of the most important tributaries of the Sarysu. The city of Zhezkazgan, the capital of Ulytau Region, is located by its banks. A reservoir was built close to the city at the time of the Kazakh SSR.

== Course ==
The Karakengir river originates in the Zhaksy Arganaty massif of the Ulytau, Kazakh Uplands. Its source is in a spring near Barakkol lake. It heads first southeastwards, then midway through its course it bends slightly southwestwards. In its last stretch it bends again and heads roughly southwards through a floodplain. Finally it joins the right bank of the Sarysu 50 km (31 mi) to the south of Zhezkazgan.

The river valley is between 0.3 km (0.19 mi) and 0.5 km (0.31 mi) wide and its channel is bound by steep banks with up to 80 m (260 ft) high cliffs in some stretches. The river is fed by snow and its level is at its highest in April. By the summer the Karakengir stops flowing and splits into disconnected pools. The main tributaries are the 143 km (89 mi) long Sarykengir, the 100 km (62 mi) long Zhylandy, and the 91 km (57 mi) long Zhezdi.

== See also ==
- List of rivers of Kazakhstan
