= Eset Baiken =

Kazakh politician (born 1986)

- Есет Байкен
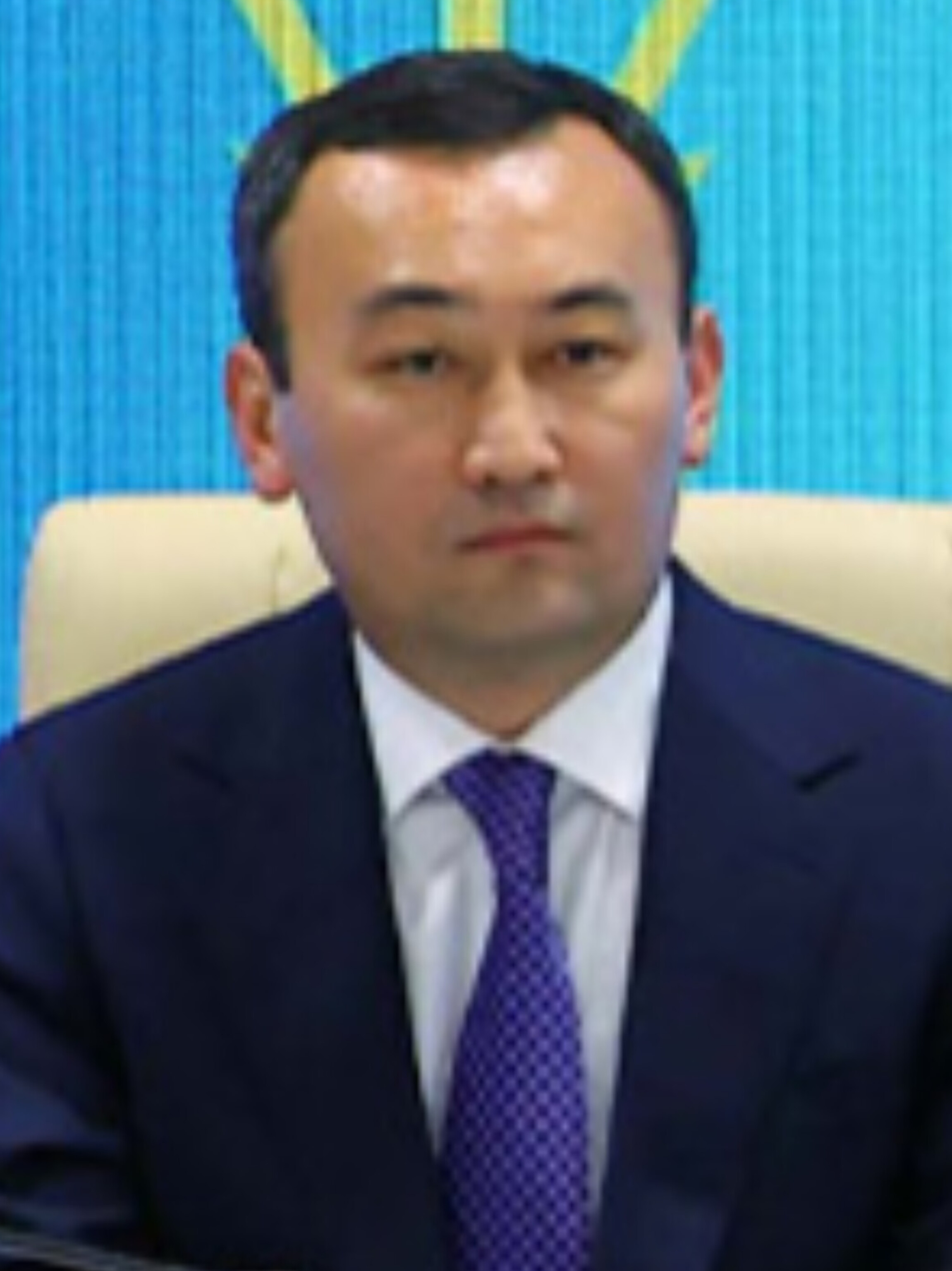
- Baiken in 2026

Äkim of Ulytau Region
- Incumbent
- Assumed office 17 July 2026
- President: Kassym-Jomart Tokayev
- Preceded by: Dastan Ryspekov

Personal details
- Born: 23 October 1986 (age 39) Barshyn, Nura, Karaganda Region, Kazakh SSR, Soviet Union
- Children: 3
- Education: Humanities and Law College
- Alma mater: Kazakh Humanitarian Law University (LLB); Karagandy State University (BEc)

Eset Berikūly Baiken (Note: Often transliterated as Yesset Berikuly Baiken through a Russified Romanization of Есет Берикулы Байкен.) (Kazakh: Есет Берікұлы Байкен; born 23 October, 1986) is a Kazakh politician serving as akim of Ulytau Region since 2026.

== Early life and education ==
Eset Berikuly Baiken was born on October 23, 1986, in Barshyn, a village in Nura District, Karaganda Region, Kazakh Soviet Socialist Republic, Soviet Union (now Kazakhstan).

In 2005, Eset Baiken graduated from the Humanities and Law College under Kazakh Humanitarian Law University (now Maqsut Narikbayev University). He studied at the Kazakh Humanitarian Law University received a LLB in 2008, and earned a BEc from the Karagandy State University in 2010.

== Career ==
After graduating from the Kazakh Humanitarian Law University in Astana, Eset Baiken joined the City Department of Economy and Budget Planning. From December 2008 to July 2009 he served as a leading specialist in the Section of Investment Policy and Planning, and from July 2009 to October 2010 he was the Section's chief specialist. In 2010–2011 he worked in the Section of Legal Support and Procurement of the City Department of Economy and Budget Planning, and from 2011 to 2013 he held the same position in the Department of Socio‑Cultural Affairs of the akim's Office of Imangali Tasmagambetov.

In 2013 Eset Baiken became chief inspector in the akim's Office, and in 2016 he was appointed head of the Organizational and Inspection Department.

In August 2016 he moved to the Presidential Administration as an expert in the Secretariat of the chief of Staff; one year later, he was appointed state inspector in the Section of State Control and Organizational‑Territorial Work.

On February 1, 2019, with the approval of the Maslikhat of Nura District and by order of Karaganda Region akim Erlan Qoşanov, Eset Baiken was appointed akim of Nura District. After serving until July 2019, he returned to Nur‑Sultan (Astana) and was appointed deputy head of the akim's Office of Altai Kölgınov. After one month, he was promoted to Office's head.

On October 14, 2020, with the consent of Nur‑Sultan Maslihat's members and by order of akim Altai Kölgınov, Eset Baiken was appointed Saryarqa District's akim. On February 9, 2022, akim Kölgınov appointed him as his deputy.

On July 17, 2026, Eset Baiken and Nurtas Qaripbaev, deputy akim of the Ulytau Region, were proposed by president Kassym-Jomart Tokayev as candidates for the post of akim of the Ulytau Region. Baiken received 87% of the votes of 64 members of local maslihat and by Tokayev's decree No. 1372, he was appointed to the post.

== Personal life ==
Eset Baiken is married and has three children. He speaks Kazakh and Russian.
