= Blinov Island =

Island of the Caspian Sea

Coordinates: 46.1792°N 49.1056°E

Blinov (Russian: Блинов) is an island in the Caspian Sea on the Obzhorovsky site in the Astrakhan Nature Reserve.
