= Caspian lowland desert =

Ecoregion in Eurasia

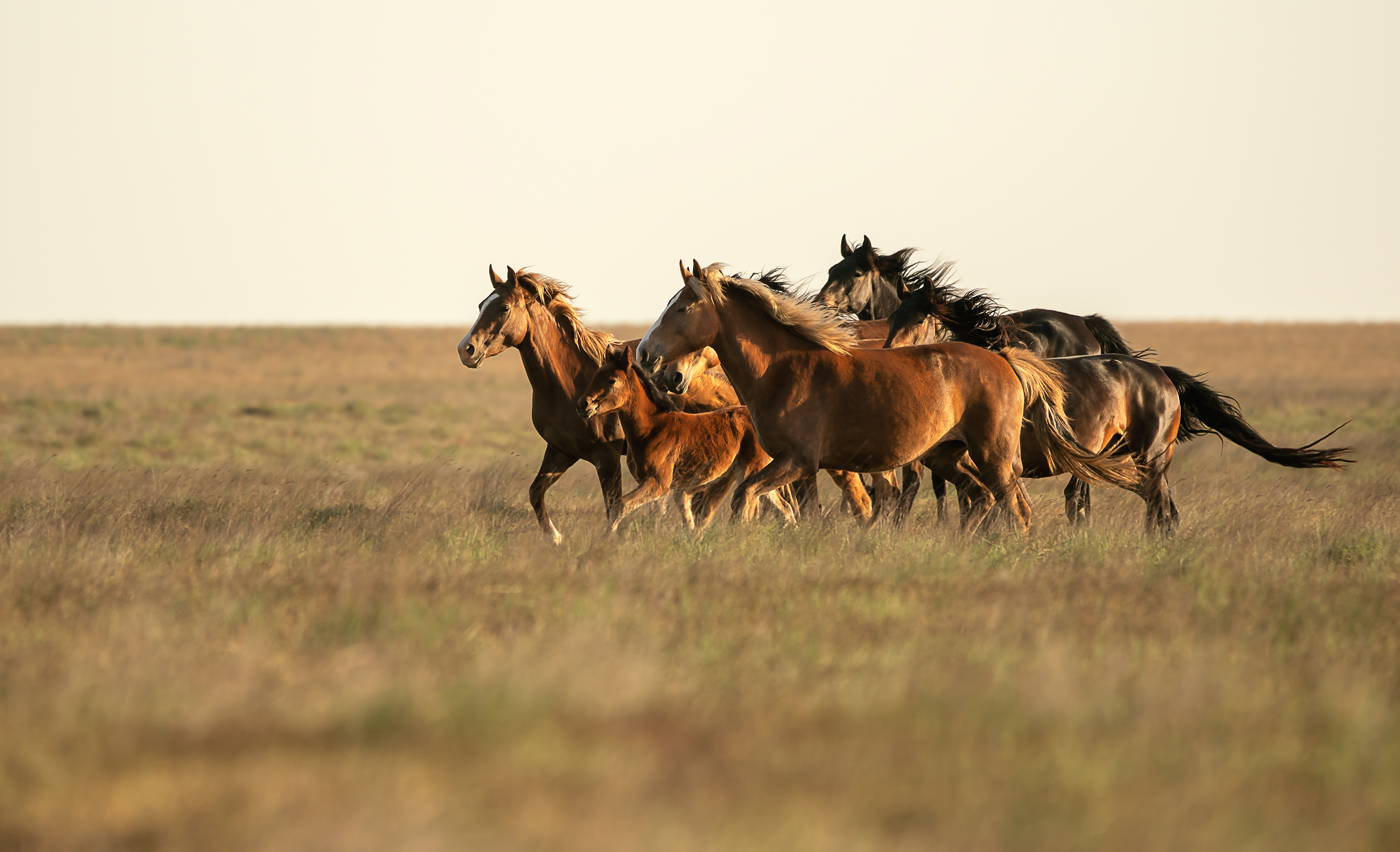
- Wild horses in Chyornye Zemli Nature Reserve

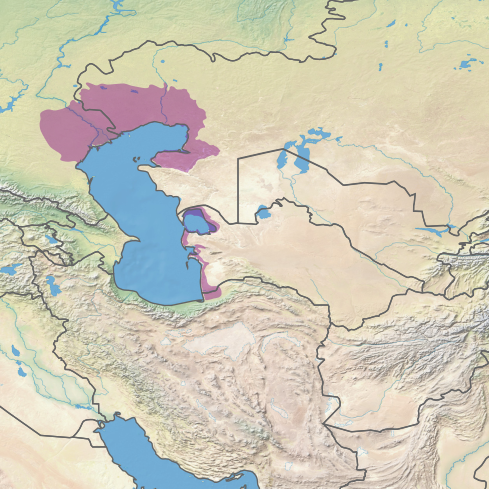
- Ecoregion territory (in purple). Note the coastal portion on the southeast of the Caspian Sea.

Ecology
- Realm: Palearctic
- Biome: deserts and xeric shrublands
- Borders: Caspian Hyrcanian mixed forests; Central Asian southern desert; Kazakh semi-desert; Pontic steppe

Geography
- Area: 267,300 km^{2} (103,200 sq mi)
- Countries: Russia; Kazakhstan; Turkmenistan; Iran
- Coordinates: 51.75°N 96.25°E

Conservation
- Conservation status: Critical/endangered
- Protected: 3,838 km^{2} (1%)

The Caspian lowland desert ecoregion (WWF ID: PA1308) covers the north and southeast coasts of the Caspian Sea, including the deltas of the Volga River and Ural River in the northern region. While the region gets relatively low amounts of precipitation (less than 200 mm/year), wildlife is supported by the river estuaries and the sea itself. The wetlands are an internationally important area for bird nesting and migratory resting. The ecoregion is in the Palearctic realm, and the deserts and xeric shrublands biome. It has an area of 267,300 square kilometres (103,200 sq mi).

== Location and description ==
The ecoregion is approximately contained within the Caspian Depression, a sunken geological region feeding in to the Caspian, the surface of which is itself at 28 meters (92 ft) below worldwide sea level. The northern section is almost 900 km wide, and stretches up to 300 km inland across Russia and Kazakhstan. The sector along the southeast coast of the Caspian is mostly in Turkmenistan. Elevations throughout the ecoregion range between -28 and +100 meters. The dry areas were once underwater, but as the sea has slowly receded the dry areas have revealed a landscape of sand dunes, ridges, salt domes, salt pans ('shors'), and clay deserts ('takyrs').

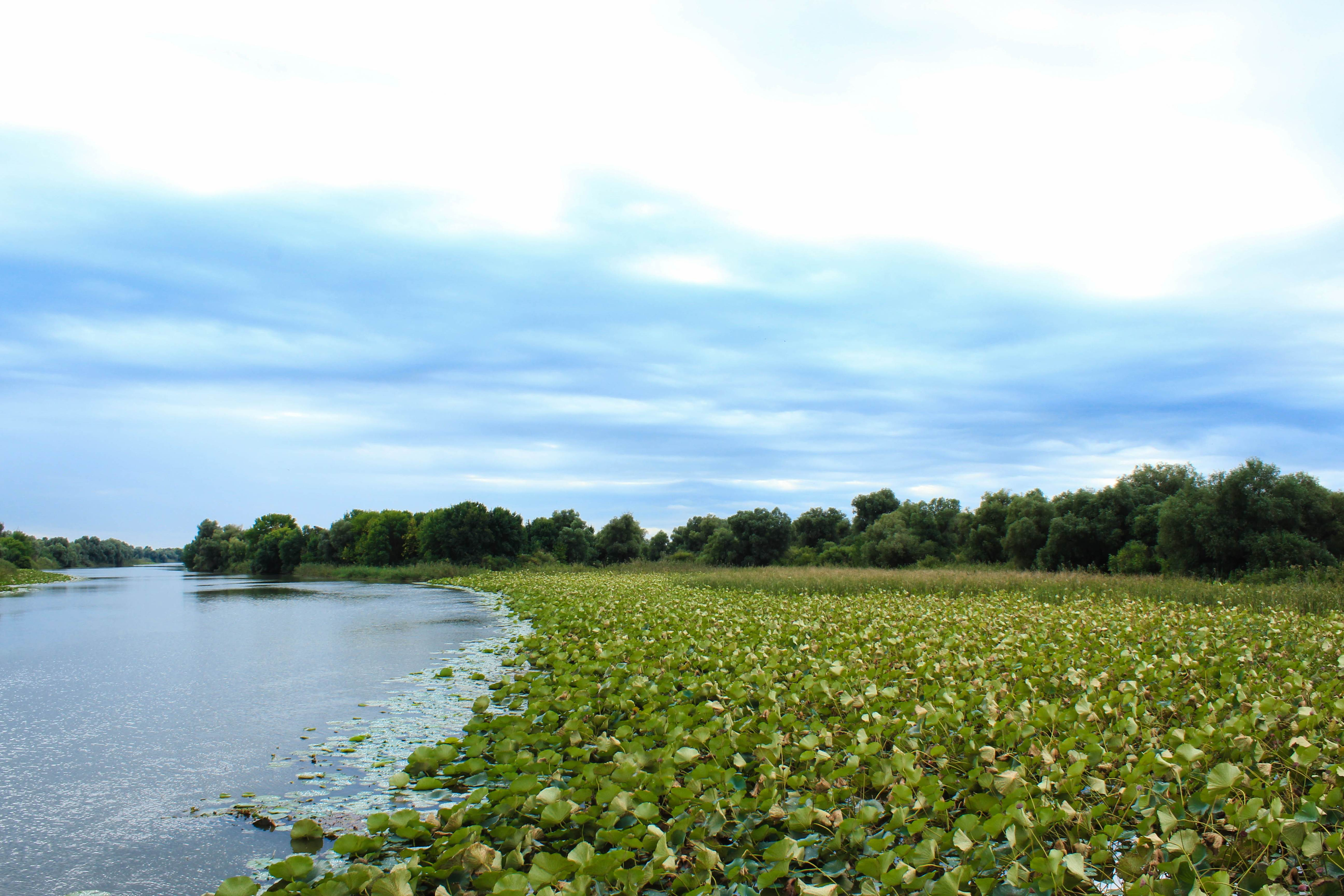
Wetlands in Volga River estuary

== Climate ==
The climate of the ecoregion is represented by that in the Volga delta, in the Astrakhan Nature Reserve, where the climate is cool semi-arid (Köppen climate classification BSk). This climate is characterized by high variation in temperature, both daily and seasonally; with low precipitation. Average annual precipitation in the Caspian lowlands is 198 mm. Average temperature in January is −4.5 °C (23.9 °F), and in July is 25.7 °C (78.3 °F)

== Flora and fauna ==
Both dry steppe and coastal wetland floral communities are supported in this ecoregion. The vegetation on the southeast coast in Turkmenistan is relatively sparse, but notable for hosting specialized shrub and semi-shrub halophytes ('salt-loving plants'). Examples include sagebrushes (Artemisia) and tetyr (Salsola gemmascens). The latter is a shrub that reaches 0.5 metres (1.6 ft) in height.

The Caspian coast is an internationally significant nesting and migratory area for gulls, terns, and other waterfowl in the Asia-Europe migration paths. The birds that cross the area twice a year number in the tens of millions. Over 200,000 of the Eurasian coot (Fulica atra) winter in the southern Hazar Reserve.

== Protections ==
A 2017 assessment found that 3,838 km^{2}, or 1%, of the ecoregion is in protected areas. 38% of the ecoregion's area is relatively intact habitat. There are several significant nationally protected area that reach into this ecoregion:

- Astrakhan Nature Reserve, protecting three sections of the islands and marshes of the Volga River delta
- Chyornye Zemli Nature Reserve, protecting natural steppe and semi-desert ecosystems of the 'black earth' region of the Caspian lowlands
- Hazar State Nature Reserve, an ornithological reserve on the southeast coast of the Caspian Sea, in Turkmenistan.
- Alagol, Almagol and Ajigol wetlands, a reserve for many waterfowl in Golestan province, North East of Iran.
