= Aliya Beysenova =

Kazakh geographer (born 1932)

- Әлия Сәрсенқызы Бейсенова
- Born: 25 March 1932 (age 94)
- Occupation: Geographer
- Spouse: Serik Qirabaev
- Awards: Academician of the Kazakhstan Academy of Sciences (2003)

Academic background
- Education: Abai Kazakh National Pedagogical University
- Thesis: Природные исследования и развитие физико-географических идей в Казахстане (с древнейших времен до 1917 года)

Academic work
- Discipline: Geography
- Sub-discipline: Physical geography of Kazakhstan
- Institutions: Abai Kazakh National Pedagogical University; Kazgosizdat

Aliya Sarsenova Beysenova (Kazakh: Әлия Сәрсенқызы Бейсенова; born 25 March 1932) is a Kazakh physical geographer. She worked as a professor at the Abai Kazakh National Pedagogical University, where she also served as head of the physical geography department. She has written several books and teaching materials, and is an academician of the Kazakhstan Academy of Sciences.

== Biography ==
Aliya Sarsenovna Beysenova was born on 25 March 1932 in Konek, a tract in Zhanaarka. She graduated from the Kyzylorda Higher Pedagogical College named after M. Mametova in 1950 and the Abai Kazakh National Pedagogical University (QazŪPU) in 1954, both with honours. She later studied at the Academy of Sciences of the Soviet Union Institute of Natural History, where she received a candidate degree in 1967. She was awarded a doctorate of geographical sciences in 1984, reportedly the first Kazakh woman to obtain the degree; her dissertation, defended at the Institute of Geography of the Academy of Sciences of the Azerbaijan SSR, was Natural research and development of physical-geographical ideas in Kazakhstan (from ancient times to 1917). (Note: Природные исследования и развитие физико-географических идей в Казахстане (с древнейших времен до 1917 года))

After working at Kazgosizdat as an editor (1954-1960), Beysenova was a postgraduate student (1960-1963) and assistant (1963-1965) at QazŪPU's Department of Physical Geography. She remained at QazŪPU's Department of Physical Geography, serving as a senior lecturer (1965-1968) before being appointed associate professor in 1970, department head in 1981, and full professor in 1985. She later chaired both QazŪPU's ecology department and Scientific and Methodological Center of Ecology and Geography. Outside of QazŪPU, she worked at the L. N. Gumilev Eurasian National University's Faculty of Natural Sciences.

As an academic, Beysenova specializes in the physical and ecological geography of Kazakhstan; she began writing about the latter in the 1980s after noticing changes in Kazakhstan's nature. Her book Geographical Atlas of Kazakhstan, was said to "occup[y] a special place in Kazakhstani science". She is also author of Research on the Nature of Kazakhstan (Note: Исследования природы Казах стана) (1979), Physical-Geographical Research of Kazakhstan (Note: Физико-географи ческие исследования Казахстана) (1982); Pioneers in the Study of Kazakhstan's Nature (Note: Первооткрыватели природ Казахстана) (1986); and Research on the Nature of Kazakhstan and the Development of Physical-Geographical Ideas (Note: Исследовани природы Казахстана и развитие физи ко-географических идей) (1990). She has written several textbooks and teaching materials on Kazakhstan geography, and she was part of the Kazakh Soviet Encyclopedia's geography editorial board from 1970 to 1980. She is an academician of the Kazakhstan Academy of Sciences, having been appointed in 2003.

Beysenova was titled Honored Worker of Higher Education of Kazakhstan in 1987 and received the Order of the Badge of Honour. In 1999, she became part of the Presidential Administration's National Commission on Family and Women's Affairs under the Office of the President of the Republic of Kazakhstan. She was awarded the Order of the Leopard II class in December 2020.

Beysenova's husband was academic Serik Qirabaev.
