= Volga Delta =

Delta in the Caspian Sea

Coordinates: 46.733°N 47.850°E

Designations

Ramsar Wetland
- Designated: 11 October 1976
- Reference no.: 111

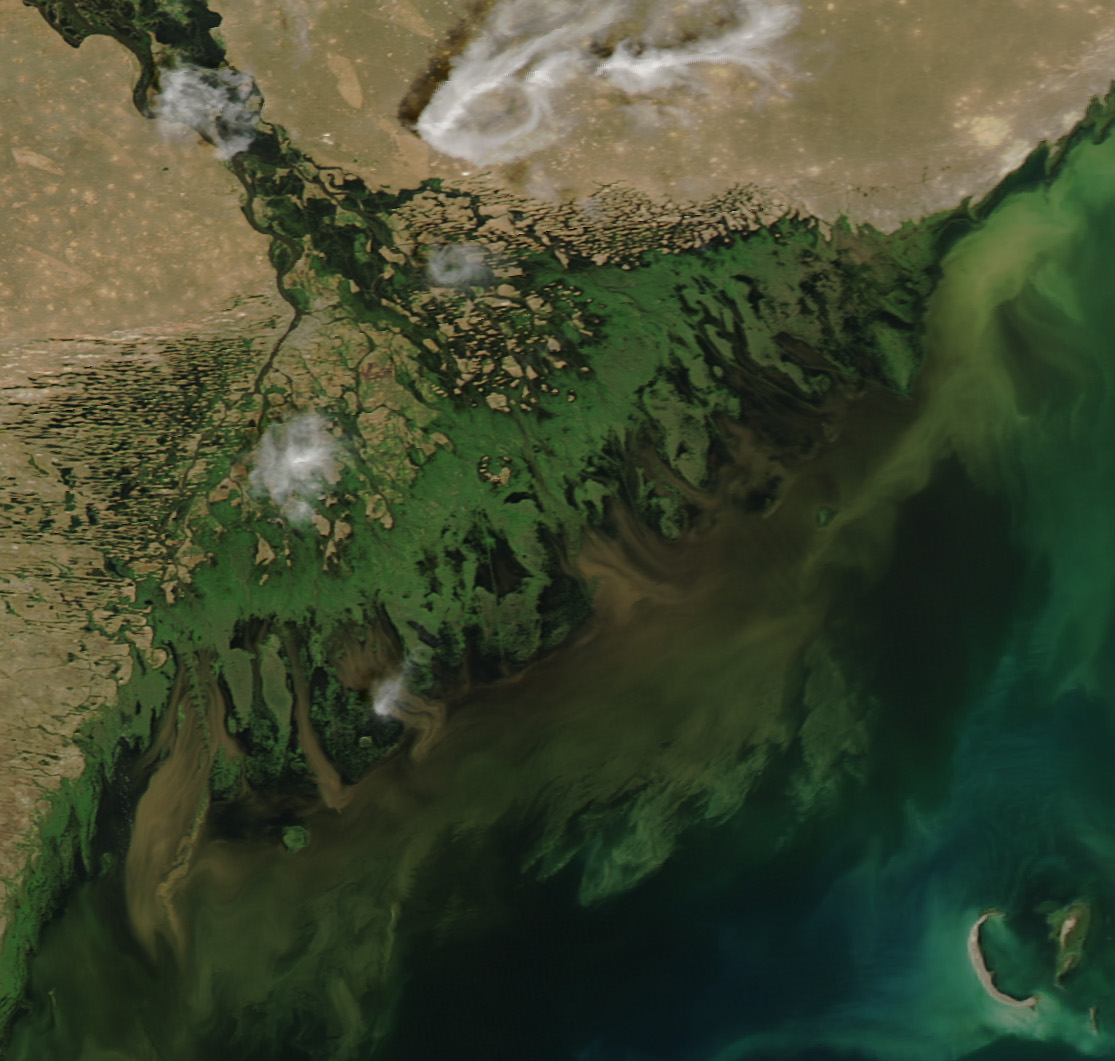
Volga Delta and northwestern Caspian Sea. While most of the green seen in this image appears to be diluted mud, some may be phytoplankton or algal blooms, particularly in the lower right corner of the image.

The Volga Delta is the largest river delta in Europe and occurs where Europe's largest river system, the Volga River, drains into the Caspian Sea in Russia's Astrakhan Oblast, north-east of the republic of Kalmykia. The delta is located in the Caspian Depression—the far eastern part of the delta lies in Kazakhstan. The delta drains into the Caspian approximately 60 km (37 mi) downstream from the city of Astrakhan.

The Volga delta has grown significantly in the 20th century because of changes in the level of the Caspian Sea. In 1880, the delta had an area of 3,222 km^{2} (1,244 mi^{2}). Today the Volga Delta covers an area of 27,224 km^{2} (10,511 mi^{2}) and is approximately 160 km (100 mi) across. It has a classical "delta pattern". The delta lies in the arid climate zone, characterized by very little rainfall. The region receives less than one inch of rainfall in January and July in normal years. Strong winds often sweep across the delta and form linear dunes. Along the front of the delta, one will find muddy sand shoals, mudflats, and coquina banks.

== Three zones ==
The changing level of the Caspian Sea has resulted in three distinct zones in the delta.

The higher areas of the first zone are known as "Baer's mounds," named after researcher Karl Ernst von Baer who worked in this region. These mounds are linear ridges of clayey sands, ranging from 5 to 22 m (16 to 72 ft) in height, and averaging about 8 m (26 ft). They are between 0.4 and 10 km (0.2 and 6 mi) in length. Between the Baer's mounds are depressions that fill with water and become either fresh or saline bays; the height from the bottom of a depression to the peak of its neighboring mound ranges from 10 to 15 m (30 to 50 ft). These depressions, called "ilmens" (from Russian through Finnish, "small lake," as in Russia's Lake Ilmen), used to form part of the early, very deep river delta but gradually became separated from it. Because of their isolation from the fresh waters of the Volga, they are becoming increasingly saline. Together they form a "vast (more than 300 km^{2} (120 mi^{2})) and extremely diverse area of western substeppe ilmens (WSI)" which, because of the varying degrees of wetness and salinization, house a wealth of flora and fauna. The origin of these mounds and ilmens is still debated: the early suggestion that they were formed by aeolian (wind) action is now discredited, and now they are thought to have arisen either underwater or through river flow.

The second zone, in the delta proper, generally has very little relief (usually less than one metre), and is the site of active and abandoned water channels, small dunes and algal flats.

The third zone is composed of a broad platform extending up to 60 km (37 mi) offshore, and is the submarine part of the delta.

== Wildlife ==
The delta has been protected since the early 1900s, with one of the first Russian nature preserves (Astrakhan Nature Reserve) having been set up there in 1919. Much of its local fauna is considered endangered. The delta is a major staging area for many species of water birds, raptors and passerines. Although the delta is best known for its sturgeons, catfish and carp are also found in large numbers in the delta region. The lotus has been adopted as the motif of the national flag of the neighbouring Kalmyks, since it is a venerated symbol in their Buddhist beliefs—they are the sole European people of Mongolian (Oirat) origin.

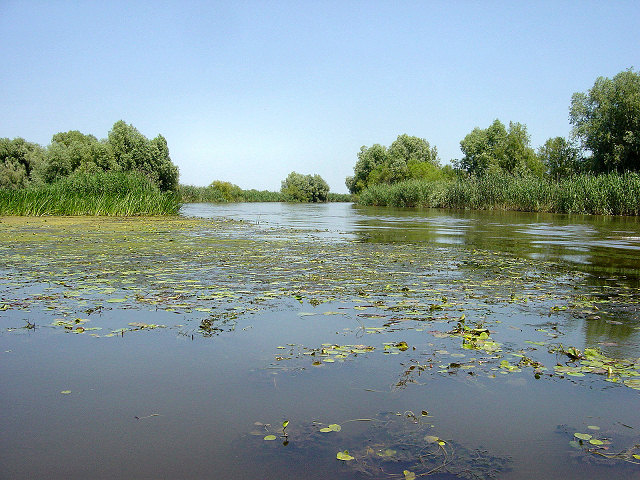
The Volga Delta is the only place in Russia where flamingoes may be found.

=== Important Bird Area ===
The delta has been designated an Important Bird Area (IBA) by BirdLife International because it supports significant numbers of many waterbird species, including breeding squacco herons, great white egrets and Dalmatian pelicans.

== Protection and Destruction ==
Industrial and agricultural modification to the delta plain has resulted in significant wetland loss. Between 1984 and 2001, the delta lost 277 km^{2} (107 mi^{2}) of wetlands, or an average of approximately 16 km^{2} (6.2 mi^{2}) per year, from natural and human-induced causes. The Volga discharges large amounts of industrial waste and sediment into the relatively shallow northern part of the Caspian Sea. The added fertilizers nourish the algal blooms that grow on the surface of the sea, allowing them to grow larger.
