= List of Äkims of Ulytau Region =

This is the list of äkıms of Ulytau Region that have held the position since the creation of the region in 2022.

== List of Äkıms ==
No.	Portrait	Name	Term of office		Source
1		Berik Abdygaliuly	14 June 2022	9 October 2024	
2		Dastan Ryspekov	9 October 2024	17 July 2026	
3		Eset Baiken	17 July 2026	Incumbent	
