= Dastan Ryspekov =

Kazakh politician (born 1984)

- Дастан Рыспеков
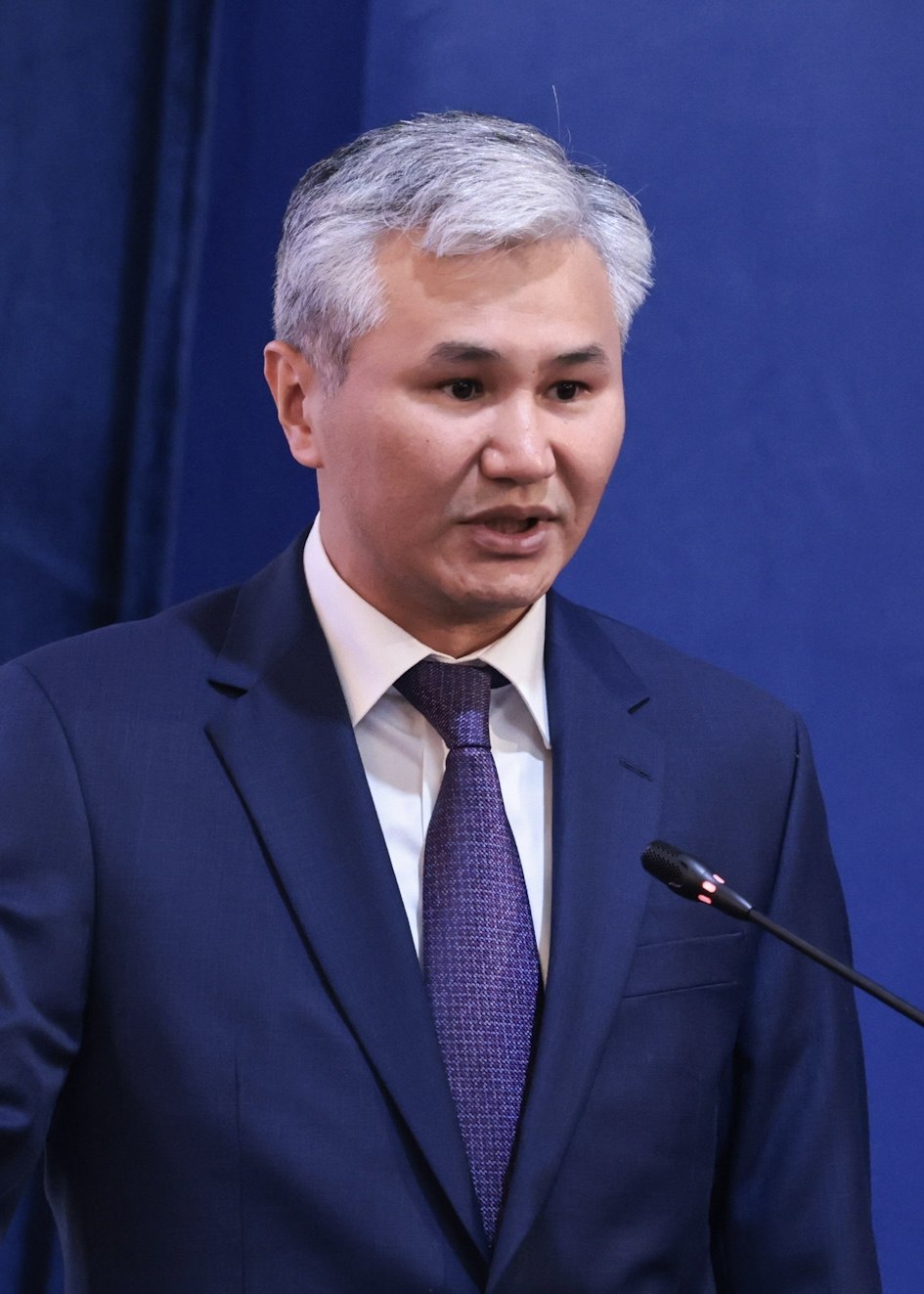
- Ryspekov in 2024

Äkim of Ulytau Region
- In office 9 October 2024 – 17 July 2026
- President: Kassym-Jomart Tokayev
- Preceded by: Berik Abdygaliuly
- Succeeded by: Eset Baiken

Personal details
- Born: 23 June 1984 (age 42) Jezkazgan, Kazakh SSR, Soviet Union
- Spouse: Saule Qalybayeva
- Children: 2
- Education: Almaty Law Academy of Kazakh Humanitarian Law University; Academy of Public Administration
- Alma mater: Al-Farabi Kazakh National University

Dastan Adaiūly Ryspekov (Note: Often transliterated as Dastan Adaevich Ryspekov through a Russified Romanization of Дастан Адаевич Рыспеков.) (Kazakh: Дастан Адайұлы Рыспеков; born 23 June 1984) is a Kazakh lawyer and manager serving as the akim of Ulytau Region from 2024 to 2026.

== Early life and education ==
Dastan Ryspekov was born on June 23, 1984, in the city of Jezkazgan, Kazakh Soviet Socialist Republic, Soviet Union (now Kazakhstan).

In 2005, he graduated from the Al-Farabi Kazakh National University with a degree public administration. He studied at the Almaty Law Academy of Kazakh Humanitarian Law University (now Maqsut Narikbayev University) and received a law degree in 2008. Later, Ryspekov earned a MPA from the Academy of Public Administration under the president of Kazakhstan in 2022.

== Early career ==
After graduating from Al-Farabi Kazakh National University in 2006, he joined the Almaty Department of Economy and Budget Planning as a senior specialist in the Forecasts and Revenues Division. In 2007, he moved to the Department of Economic Policy and Sectoral Planning, where he was appointed head.

In 2011, he became head of the Planning, Accounting, and Information Department within the City Audit Commission.

In 2013, he transferred to the municipal Office of Economy and Budget Planning and was named deputy head.

In 2015, while leading the Planning and Monitoring Sector at the Accounts Committee, he relocated to Astana.

After one year he was appointed head of the Accounting and Reporting Department at Expo 2017 (now QazExpoCongress) and concurrently served as chief accountant.

Two years later, on September 11, 2018, he was assigned to Pavlodar Region to lead the Department of Entrepreneurship, Trade and Tourism.

In 2019, he returned to Expo 2017 to head the Department of Economy and Budget Planning.

== Political career ==
On February 19, 2020, by order of culture and sports minister Aqtoty Raiymqulova, he was appointed chairman of the Committee for Tourism Industry, then part of the Ministry of Culture and Sports. On August 28, 2023, he was relieved of that post.

On August 21, 2023, he was named deputy akim of Ulytau Region under Berik Abdygaliuly.

In March 2024, he was dismissed from that position and transferred to the Presidential Administration as a state inspector.

On October 9, 2024, Berik Abdygaliuly was dismissed as akim of Ulytau Region. President Tokayev, via a proposal read by prime minister Oljas Bektenov, nominated Ryspekov and Ulantai Usenov for the vacant post. The regional Mäslihat voted 49 of 64 in favor of Ryspekov and 15 for Usenov, and by president Tokayev's decree No. 671 Ryspekov was appointed secondakim of Ulytau Region. On July 17, 2026, he was relieved of post.

== Personal life ==
Ryspekov is married to Saule Qalybayeva. They have sons Alisher and Aldiyar.
