= Astrakhan Nature Reserve =

Nature reserve in Astrakhan Oblast, Russia

- Russian: Астраханский заповедник (Also: Astrakhanskiy)
- IUCN category Ia (strict nature reserve)
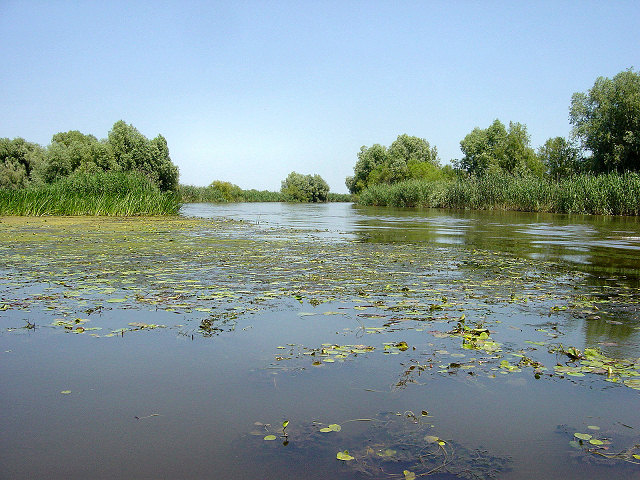
- Astrakhan, Volga Delta

- Location within Russia
- Interactive map of Astrakhan Nature Reserve
- Location: Astrakhan Oblast
- Nearest city: Astrakhan
- Coordinates: 45°34′52″N 47°54′59″E
- Area: 66,816 hectares (165,106 acres; 258 sq mi)
- Established: 1919
- Governing body: Ministry of Natural Resources and Environment
- Website: http://astrakhanzapoved.ru/

Astrakhan Nature Reserve (Russian: Астраханский заповедник) (also Astrakhanskiy) is a Russian 'zapovednik' (strict nature reserve) covering an area including the islands and wetlands of the Volga Delta, where the Volga River enters the northwest sector of the Caspian Sea. The landscape is one of extensive reeds, cattails and willows and is an important nesting area for waterfowl and wading birds. The areas is rich in fish, with 50 species recorded, including beluga sturgeon. The reserve is situated in the Ikryaninsky District of Astrakhan Oblast. Since 1975, the territory has been part of a Ramsar wetlands site of international importance, and since 1984 it has been included in the World Network of Biosphere Reserves.

== Topography ==
The reserve is divided into three sections: 'Damchikskogo' in the west (30,000 hectares (120 sq mi)), 'Trehiz-binskogo' in the center (28,400 hectares (110 sq mi)) and 'Obzhorovsky' in the east (9,500 hectares (37 sq mi)). It sits in the Caspian depression, 27 meters below sea level. The delta is growing in the direction of the sea, although annual deposits of sediment are affected by dams up-river.

== Climate and ecoregion ==
Astrakhan is located in the Caspian lowland desert ecoregion. This region, on the north and northeast shores of the Caspian Sea, is characterized by sand dunes and ridges, salt soil, clay deserts (takyrs) and in places solonchaks (shors) or salt pans of 30–40 cm thickness devoid of vegetation. Plant life is sparse but features highly specialized halophytes (salt-tolerant plants).

The climate of Astrakhan is cool semi-arid (Köppen climate classification BSk). This climate is characterized by high variation in temperature, both daily and seasonally; with low precipitation.

== Flora and fauna ==
There are four broad types of vegetation in the delta: bush, forest, meadow and water. The forests communities are riparian with white willow, grass-forb and blackberry bush. The meadow areas features tallgrass, cane and sedge; the marshy meadows mostly reeds. The high number of fish species in the reserve are due to the shallow waters and abundant vegetation. There are relatively few mammal species, but muskrats, hedgehogs, stoats, weasels and various rodents are present, and mass migrations of bats are seen in late spring and early autumn. There are wolves living permanently in all three sectors of the reserve. The migratory bird season is March to November. The reserve has recorded 283 species of birds, 99 of which nest on the site (and 27 of which are listed as vulnerable in the Red Book of Russia) and 155 of which are seen in periods of migration and wintering.

== Gallery ==
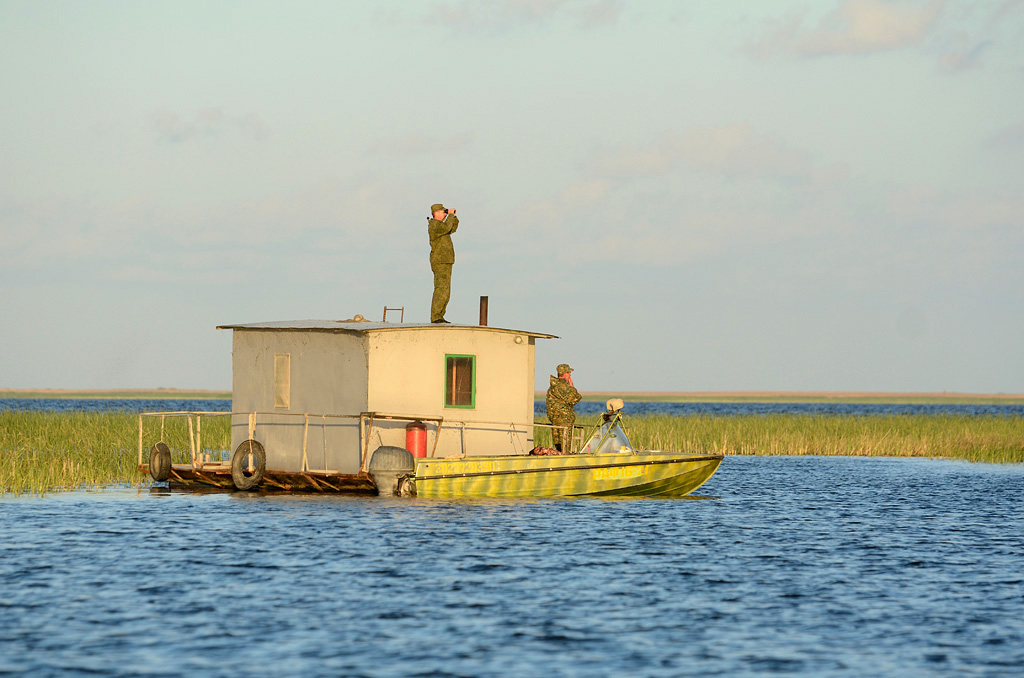
Astrakhan Nature Reserve

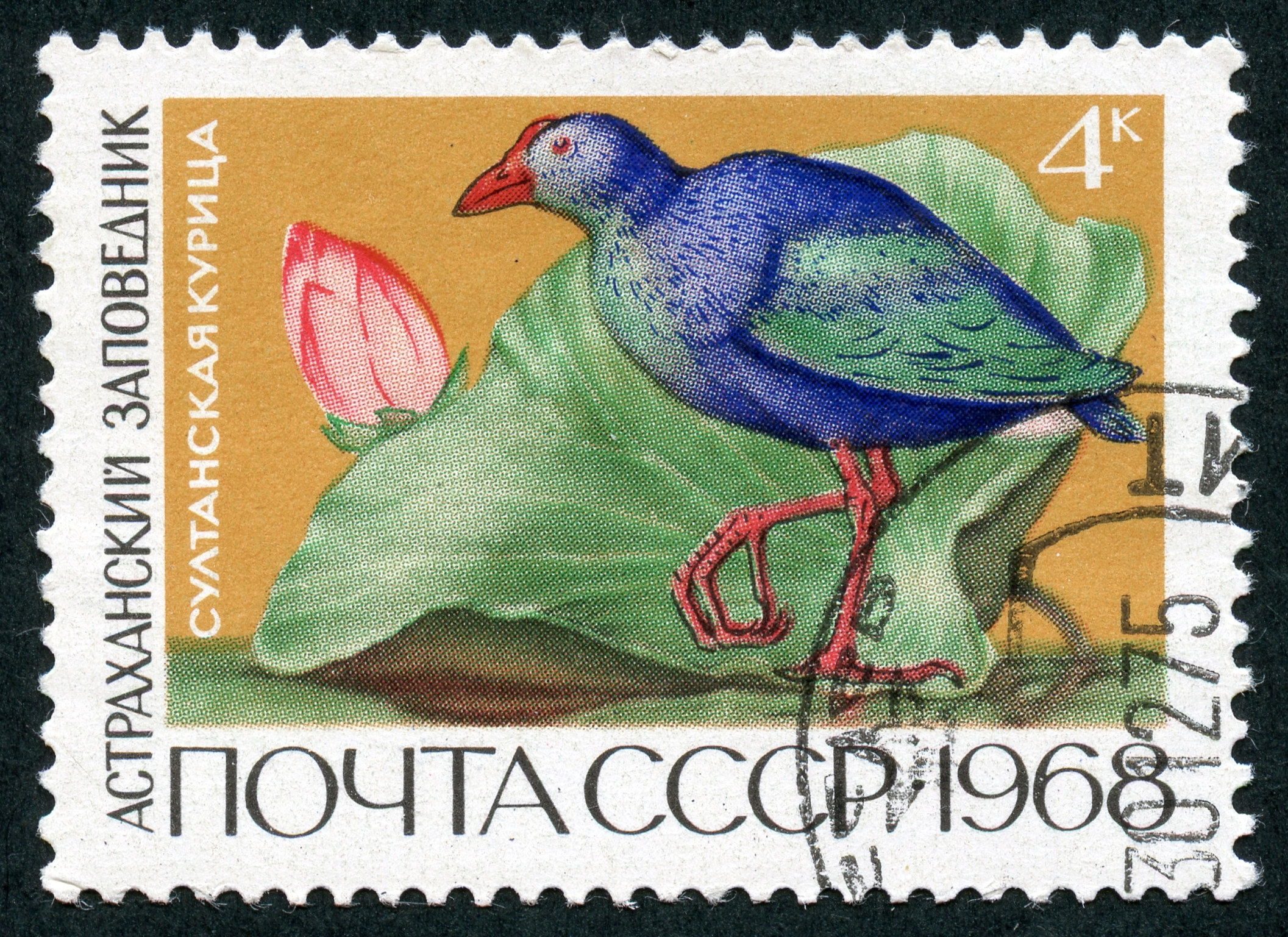
Purple swamphen and Caspian lotus, 1968 USSR stamp featuring Astrakhan Zapovednik

== Ecotourism ==
As a strict nature reserve, the Astrakhan Reserve is mostly closed to the general public, although tours and excursions can be arranged with park management through their website. The official offices are in the city of Astrakhan. A new ecological trail has been developed for visitors, with walkways to four islands and an observation platform. Reserve staff conduct boat tours for groups and individuals in the waterways of the territory. In the reserve and in its buffer zones, hunting and industrial fishing are prohibited. Sport fishing is regulated and limited to the buffer zones outside the reserve itself.

== See also ==
- List of Russian nature reserves (class 1a 'zapovedniks')
