= Berik Abdygaliuly =

Kazakh politician (born 1971)

- Берік Әбдіғалиұлы
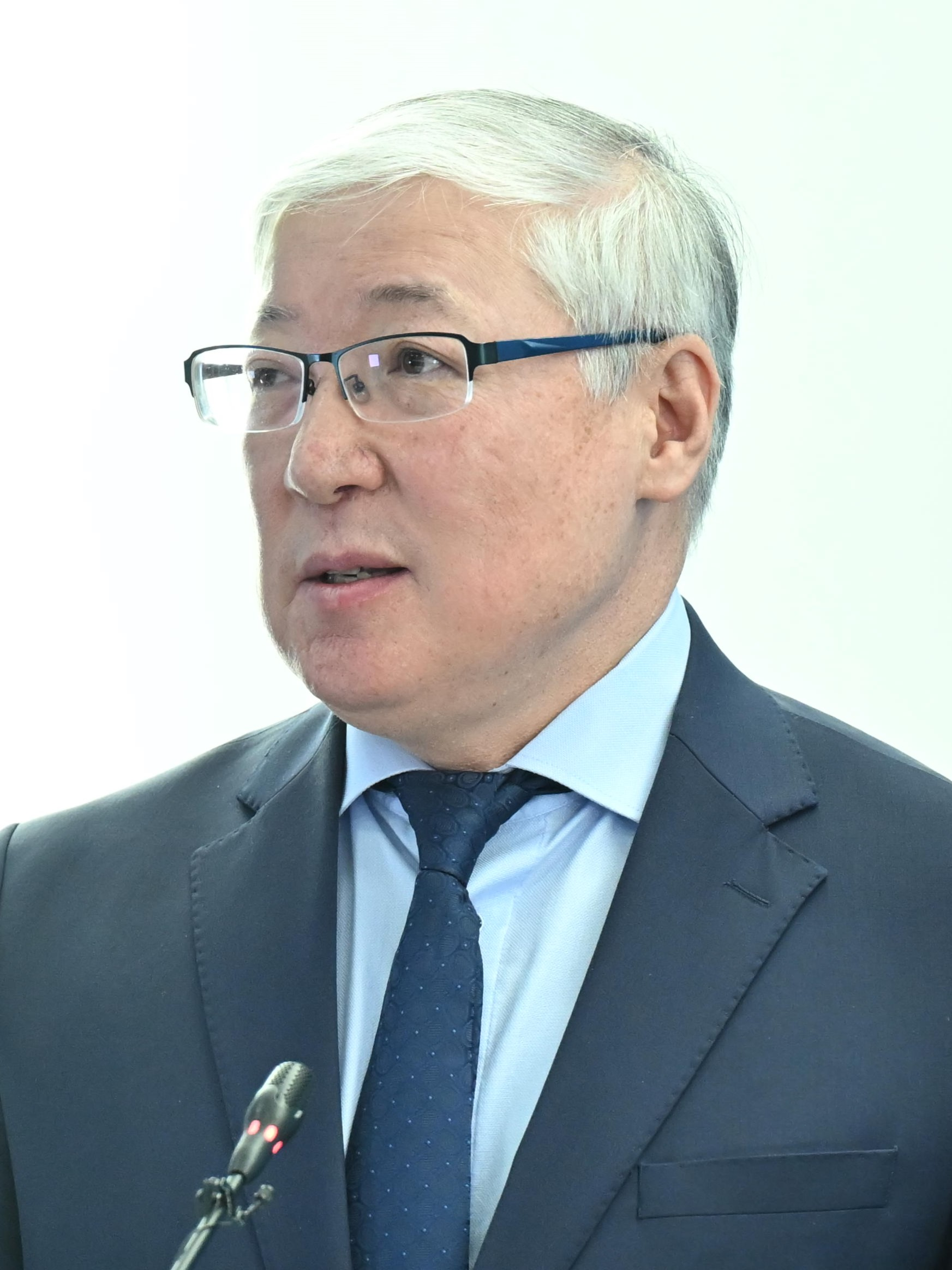
- Abdygaliuly in 2024

Äkim of Ulytau Region
- In office 11 June 2022 – 9 October 2024
- Preceded by: Position established
- Succeeded by: Dastan Ryspekov

Member of the Mäjılıs
- In office 14 January 2021 – 14 June 2022

Personal details
- Born: 18 September 1971 (age 55) Ulytau District, Karaganda Region, Kazakh SSR, Soviet Union
- Party: Aq Jol
- Education: Al-Farabi Kazakh National University

Berik Abdygaliuly (born 18 September 1971) is a Kazakh historian and politician. He served as the first akim of the Ulytau Region from June 11, 2022, to October 9, 2024.
