= Abai Kazakh National Pedagogical University =

University in Almaty, Kazakhstan

- Абай атындағы Қазақ ұлттық педагогикалық университеті
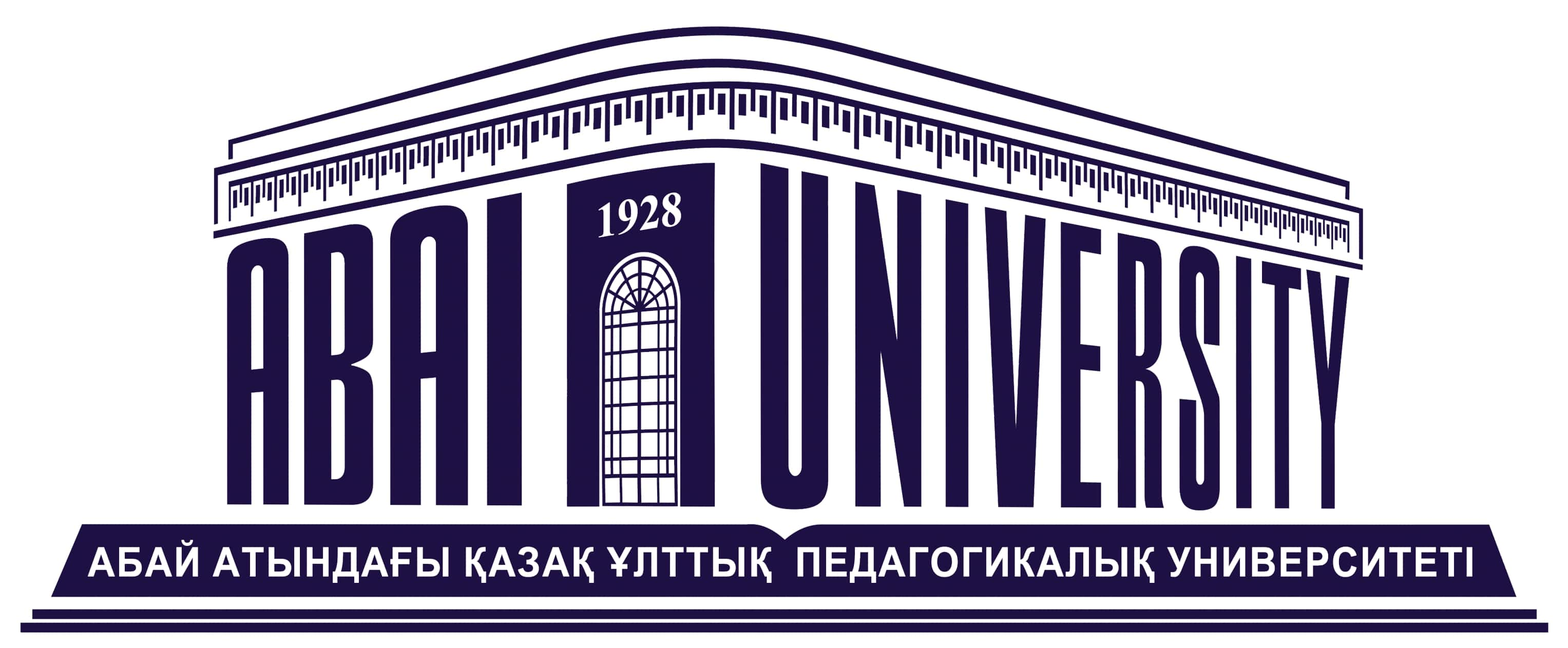
- Other names: ҚазҰПУ, Abai University
- Type: Public
- Established: September 1, 1928; 97 years ago
- Location: Almaty, Kazakhstan; 43.2564°N 76.9538°E

University rankings

Regional – Overall
- QS Emerging Europe and Central Asia: 70 (2022)

Abai Kazakh National Pedagogical University (Kazakh: Абай атындағы Қазақ ұлттық педагогикалық университеті (ҚазҰПУ), romanized: Abai atyndağy Qazaq ūlttyq pedagogikalyq universitetı (QazŪPU)) is one of the leading institutes in Central Asia. It is situated in the heart of Almaty City, Kazakhstan. In 2003 Abai University had a record enrollment of more than 23,000 students, mostly from Kazakhstan and other Central Asian countries.

== History ==
The first Kazakh institute of higher learning, which was named Kazakh State University, on September 1, 1928. It had one unique faculty - pedagogical with three separations:

- physico-mathematic
- natural studies
- linguistic studies

It was assumed to create other three faculties: pedagogical, agricultural and medical. They were supposed to work from 1932 to 1933. On behalf of intensive development of folk education, newly opened institute of higher education decided to develop as an independent pedagogical college. Therefore, in 1930 the university was renamed as Kazakh State Pedagogical College (KAZPI), and in 1935 it was renamed as Abai State University in honor of Abai Qunanbaiuly and when expanded its fields of studies in 1989 it was named just Abai University as there were more courses than technical education. Today's Abai University started its work in a small one-story building of Vernenskoy as a Women's School.

== List of Faculties ==
- Philological faculty
- Faculty of Physics and Mathematics
- Faculty of History
- Faculty of Eco-Geology
- Faculty of Bio-Chemistry
- Faculty of Psychology
- Faculty of Arts
- Faculty of Economic Sciences
- Faculty of International Relations
- Preparatory faculty (For International Students)

== Distance learning ==
The university was the first Kazakh university to start a distance learning programme in 2001. Today, the university is offering more than 12 degree programmes and 11 certificate programmes through DL, which are accessible online in Russian language and Kazakh language as well.

== Notable alumni ==
- Aliya Beysenova - geographer
