= Daryalyktakyr =

Plain in Kazakhstan

Daryalyktakyr Дариялықтақыр равнина Дарьялыктакыр
- Alluvial plain
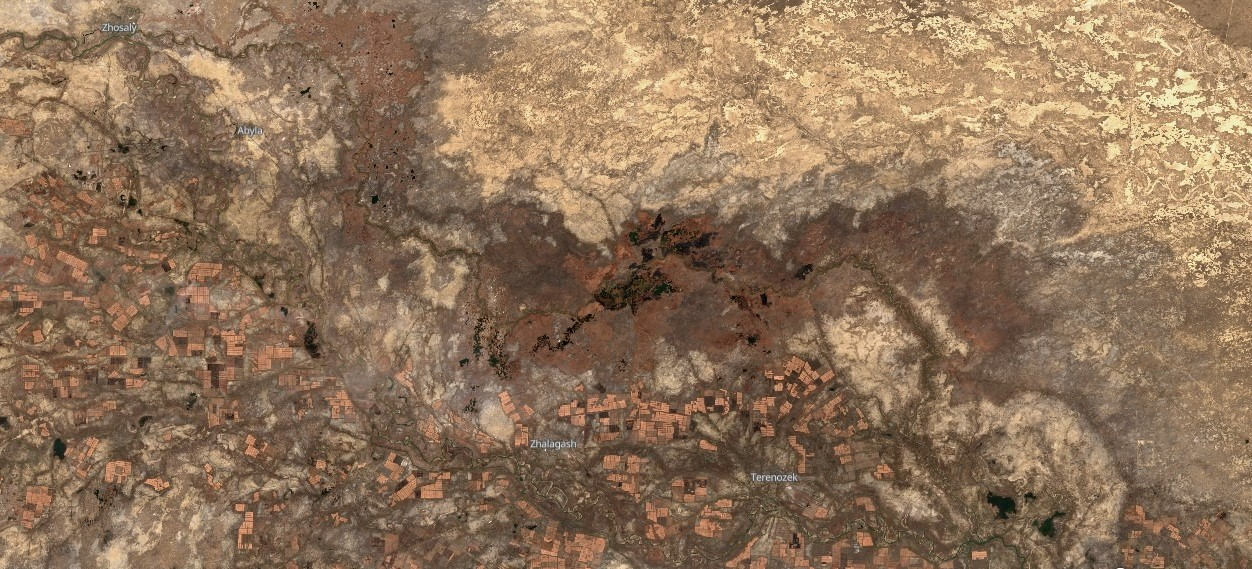
- Daryalyktakyr plain Sentinel-2 image

- Location within Kazakhstan
- Coordinates: 45°25′N 65°20′E
- Location: Kazakhstan

Dimensions
  - Length: 230 km (140 mi)
  - Width: 50 km (31 mi)
- Elevation: 110 m (360 ft) to 145 m (476 ft)

The Daryalyktakyr Plain (Kazakh: Дариялықтақыр; Russian: равнина Дарьялыктакыр), is an alluvial plain in the Kyzylorda Region, Kazakhstan.

The plain stretches across Zhalagash, Syrdarya and Shieli districts of Kyzylorda Region. A gas pipeline was built across the plain in 2012. The Shieli-Telikol Canal runs from north to south at the eastern edge.

== Geography ==
The Daryalyktakyr lies north of the lower reaches of the Syr Darya and corresponds to an ancient channel where the river flowed. It extends roughly from WNW to ESE for a length of 230 km (140 mi) between the area to the north of Zhosaly town in the west and the Telikol lakes in the east.

It is a large, elongated takir zone to the north of the current river channel covered with a top layer of alluvial sediments of mixed sand and clay. There are some solonetz and solonchak areas, as well as some small lakes and swamps at the southern edge. The Karaozek river, a right tributary of the Syr Darya, flows westwards along the southern limits of the plain.

== Flora ==
Sedges may grow in the most barren-looking areas. Wormwood, Calligonum and tamarisk grow sparsely in dry channels.

== See also ==
- Geology of Kazakhstan
