= List of regions of Kazakhstan by GDP =

This is a list of regions of Kazakhstan by nominal GDP, in Kazakhstani tenge and US dollars.

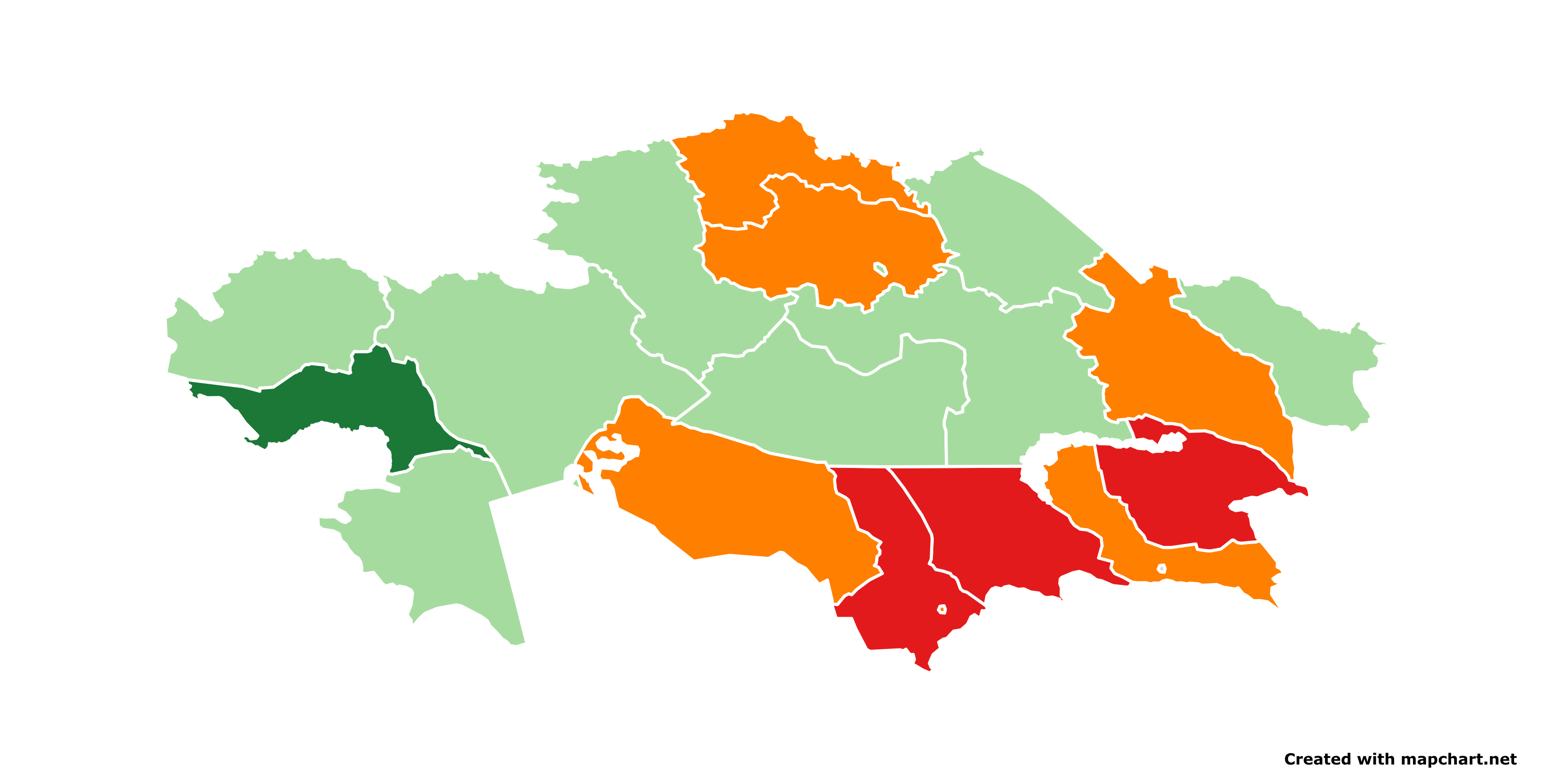
Regions of Kazakhstan by GDP per capita. Map key: > US$40,000 > US$10,000 > US$5,000 > US$3,000

== List ==
Statistics shown are for 2024 levels, according to Kazakhstan's Bureau of National Statistics. Kazakhstan includes calculations of the informal economy in its data.

#	Region	GRP			GRP/capita (mil. KZT)
#	Region	(bil. KZT)	(bil. US$)	Share	GRP/capita (mil. KZT)
1	Almaty	31,294.5	59.77	22.9%	13.84
2	Astana	15,051.9	28.75	11.0%	10.17
3	Atyrau Region	14,981.6	28.62	11.0%	21.18
4	Karaganda Region	9,059.5	17.30	6.6%	7.98
5	Almaty Region	6,040.6	11.54	4.4%	3.91
6	Pavlodar Region	5,150.8	9.84	3.8%	6.85
7	East Kazakhstan Region	5,035.1	9.62	3.7%	6.94
8	Mangystau Region	5,005.1	9.56	3.7%	6.29
9	Kostanay Region	4,969.6	9.49	3.6%	6.00
10	Aktobe Region	4,960.0	9.47	3.6%	5.25
11	Shymkent	4,738.9	9.05	3.5%	3.82
12	West Kazakhstan Region	4,722.4	9.02	3.5%	6.80
13	Turkistan Region	4,673.5	8.93	3.4%	2.18
14	Akmola Region	4,200.2	8.02	3.1%	5.33
15	Abai Region	3,248.6	6.21	2.4%	5.37
16	Jambyl Region	3,150.4	6.02	2.3%	2.58
17	Kyzylorda Region	3,073.9	5.87	2.2%	3.64
18	North Kazakhstan Region	2,621.2	5.01	1.9%	4.98
19	Ulytau Region	2,487.6	4.75	1.8%	11.23
20	Jetisu Region	2,227.9	4.26	1.6%	3.20
