= Shieli =

Shieli Шиелі
- Town
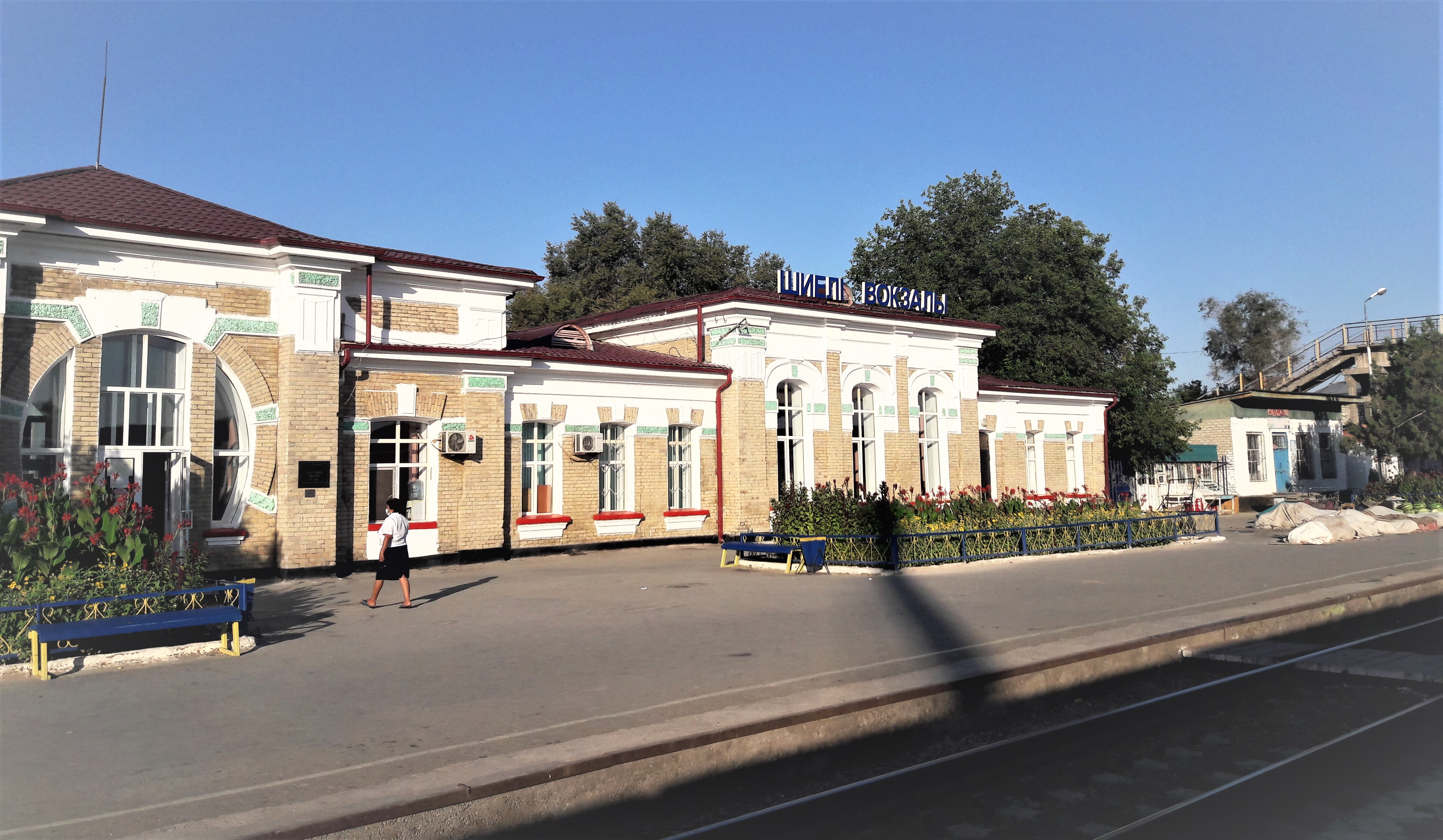

- Location in Kazakhstan
- Coordinates: 44°10′44″N 66°43′58″E
- Country: Kazakhstan
- Region: Kyzylorda Region
- District: Shieli District
- Tural District: Shieli rural district
- Founded: 1904

Population (2021)
  - Total: 32,480
- Time zone: UTC+5
- Postcode: 120700 — 120703

Shieli (Kazakh: Шиелі, romanized: Şïeli) is a village in Kyzylorda Region, southern-central Kazakhstan. It is the administrative centre of Shieli District and the head and the only settlement of Shieli rural district (KATO code - 435230100). Population: 29,632 (2009 census results); 28,621 (1999 census results).

Shieli was founded in 1904 at the time of the construction of the Orenburg–Tashkent Railway.

== Geography ==
Shieli is located by the right bank of the Syr Darya river. The 181 kilometers (112 mi) long Shieli-Telikol Canal was built for irrigation, connecting the Telikol lacustrine basin to the north with the Syr Darya river near Shieli.

=== Climate ===
Shieli has a cold desert climate (Köppen: BWk) with cold winters and hot summers.

Climate data for Shieli (1991–2020)
Month	Jan	Feb	Mar	Apr	May	Jun	Jul	Aug	Sep	Oct	Nov	Dec	Year
Mean daily maximum °C (°F)	0.5 (32.9)	4.0 (39.2)	13.2 (55.8)	22.0 (71.6)	28.6 (83.5)	33.7 (92.7)	35.2 (95.4)	33.6 (92.5)	27.3 (81.1)	19.6 (67.3)	9.5 (49.1)	2.3 (36.1)	19.1 (66.4)
Daily mean °C (°F)	−4.5 (23.9)	−2.0 (28.4)	5.8 (42.4)	14.4 (57.9)	21.0 (69.8)	25.9 (78.6)	27.2 (81.0)	25.2 (77.4)	18.6 (65.5)	11.0 (51.8)	2.8 (37.0)	−3.1 (26.4)	11.9 (53.4)
Mean daily minimum °C (°F)	−8.5 (16.7)	−6.6 (20.1)	0.1 (32.2)	7.6 (45.7)	13.3 (55.9)	17.6 (63.7)	18.8 (65.8)	16.9 (62.4)	10.4 (50.7)	3.7 (38.7)	−2.3 (27.9)	−7.2 (19.0)	5.3 (41.5)
Average precipitation mm (inches)	18.5 (0.73)	15.5 (0.61)	15.8 (0.62)	17.0 (0.67)	20.1 (0.79)	7.4 (0.29)	4.8 (0.19)	3.2 (0.13)	2.4 (0.09)	8.1 (0.32)	18.5 (0.73)	13.6 (0.54)	144.9 (5.70)
Average precipitation days (≥ 1.0 mm)	5.0	3.6	3.5	3.6	3.2	1.6	1.0	0.7	0.5	1.7	4.0	3.9	32.3
Source: NOAA
