= Zhanaarka District =

Coordinates: 47°14′24″N 69°51′00″E

Zhanaarka
- District
- Жаңаарқа ауданы
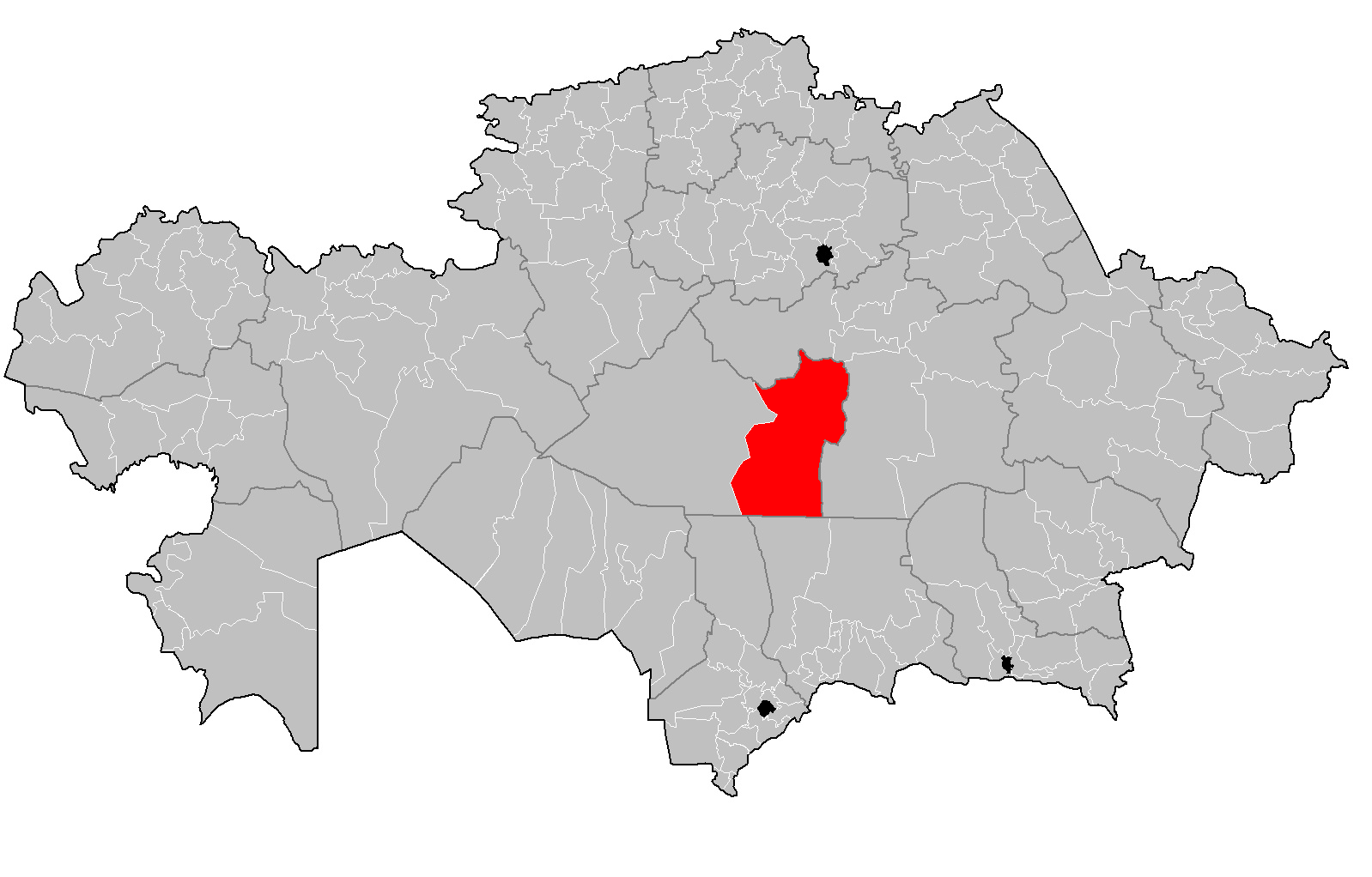
- Country: Kazakhstan
- Region: Ulytau Region
- Administrative center: Zhanaarka

Government
  - Akim: Kanat Kozhukaev

Population (2013)
  - Total: 32,312
- Time zone: UTC+6 (East)

Zhanaarka District (Kazakh: Жаңаарқа ауданы, Jañaarqa audany) is a district of Ulytau Region in central Kazakhstan. The administrative center of the district is the settlement of Zhanaarka. Population: 32,312 (2013 estimate); 30,818 (2009 census results); 32,184 (1999 census results).

== Geography ==
Rivers Saryozen, Sarysu and its tributary Atasu, as well as lakes Kabyrshakty and Shoshkakol are located in the district.
