= Shieli District =

Shieli
- District
- Шиелі ауданы
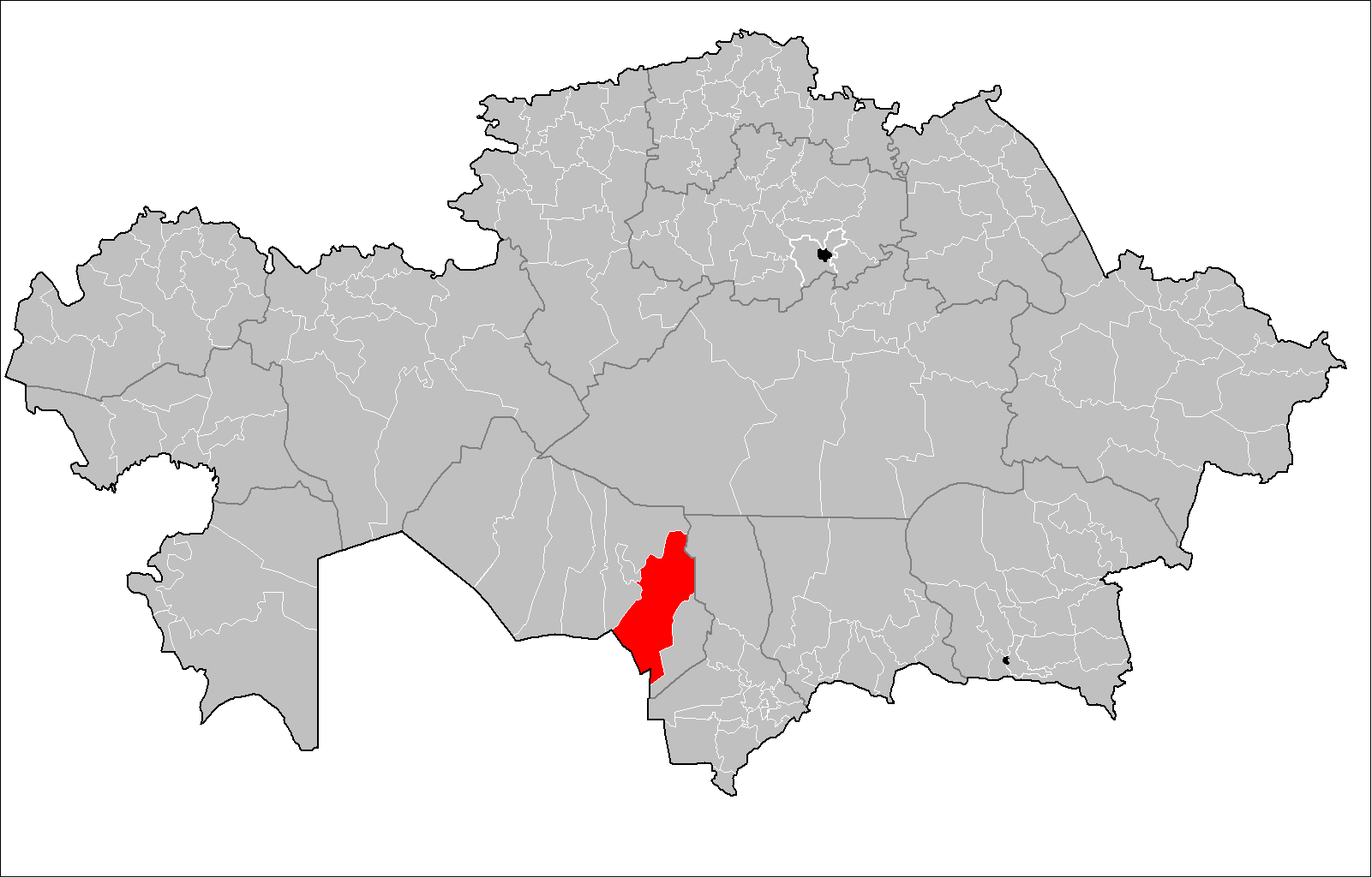
- Coordinates: 44°10′12″N 66°18′00″E
- Country: Kazakhstan
- Region: Kyzylorda Region
- Administrative center: Shieli

Government
  - Akim: Nurzhan Akhatov

Population (2013)
  - Total: 78,427
- Time zone: UTC+6 (East)

Shieli (Kazakh: Шиелі ауданы, Şielı audany) is a district of Kyzylorda Region in southern Kazakhstan. The administrative center of the district is the urban-type settlement of Shieli. Population: 78,427 (2013 estimate); 73,896 (2009 census results); 75,306 (1999 census results).

Shieli district is located in the middle reaches of the ancient Syr Darya River. In the eastern side there are the ancient cities of Sighnaq, Bestam, known to all, in the southern side the ancient Karatau mountains stretch. Further, the Sarysu River, originating in the Arch and Telikul, is a witness to many historical events. The western part of the district is in contact with the regional center, and the northern part with Kyzylkum, famous for its winds.
