= Shieli-Telikol Canal =

Irrigation canal in Kazakhstan

Shieli-Telikol Canal Шиелі-Телікөл Каналы
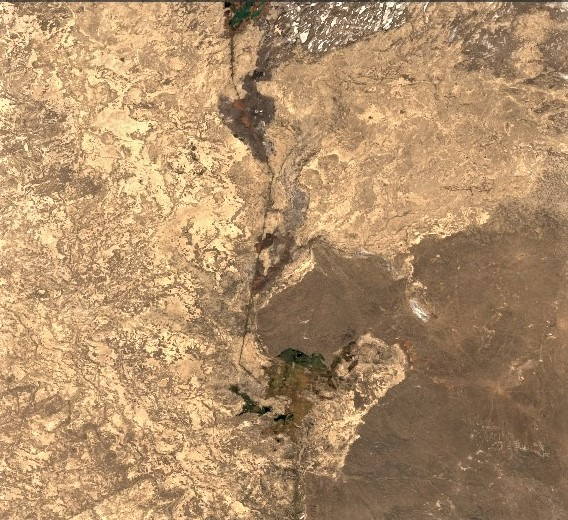
- Shieli-Telikol Canal middle stretch Sentinel-2 image
- Coordinates: 44°10′N 66°43′E

Specifications
- Length: 181 km (112 miles)

Geography
- Start point: Shieli
- End point: Telikol
- Connects to: Syr Darya

The Shieli-Telikol Canal (Kazakh: Шиелі-Телікөл Каналы), also known as "Shieli Canal" and "Telikol Canal", is an irrigation canal in the Kyzylorda Region, Kazakhstan. It connects the Telikol lakes with Shieli.

== Geography ==
The canal begins in the Telikol lacustrine area at the mouth of the Sarysu river in the north. It runs almost straight southwards for 181 km (112 mi) at the eastern end of the Daryaly takir plain, to end up near Shieli, a town on the right bank of the Syr Darya river. The width of the canal is 6 m (20 ft) to 10 m (33 ft) and its depth 3 m (9.8 ft) to 4 m (13 ft). It has a flow of 12 m^{3}/s (420 cu ft/s) and irrigates an area of roughly 50,000 ha (120,000 acres) in the Zhanakorgan and Shieli districts.
