= Zhanaarka =

Zhanaarka Жаңаарқа
- Town
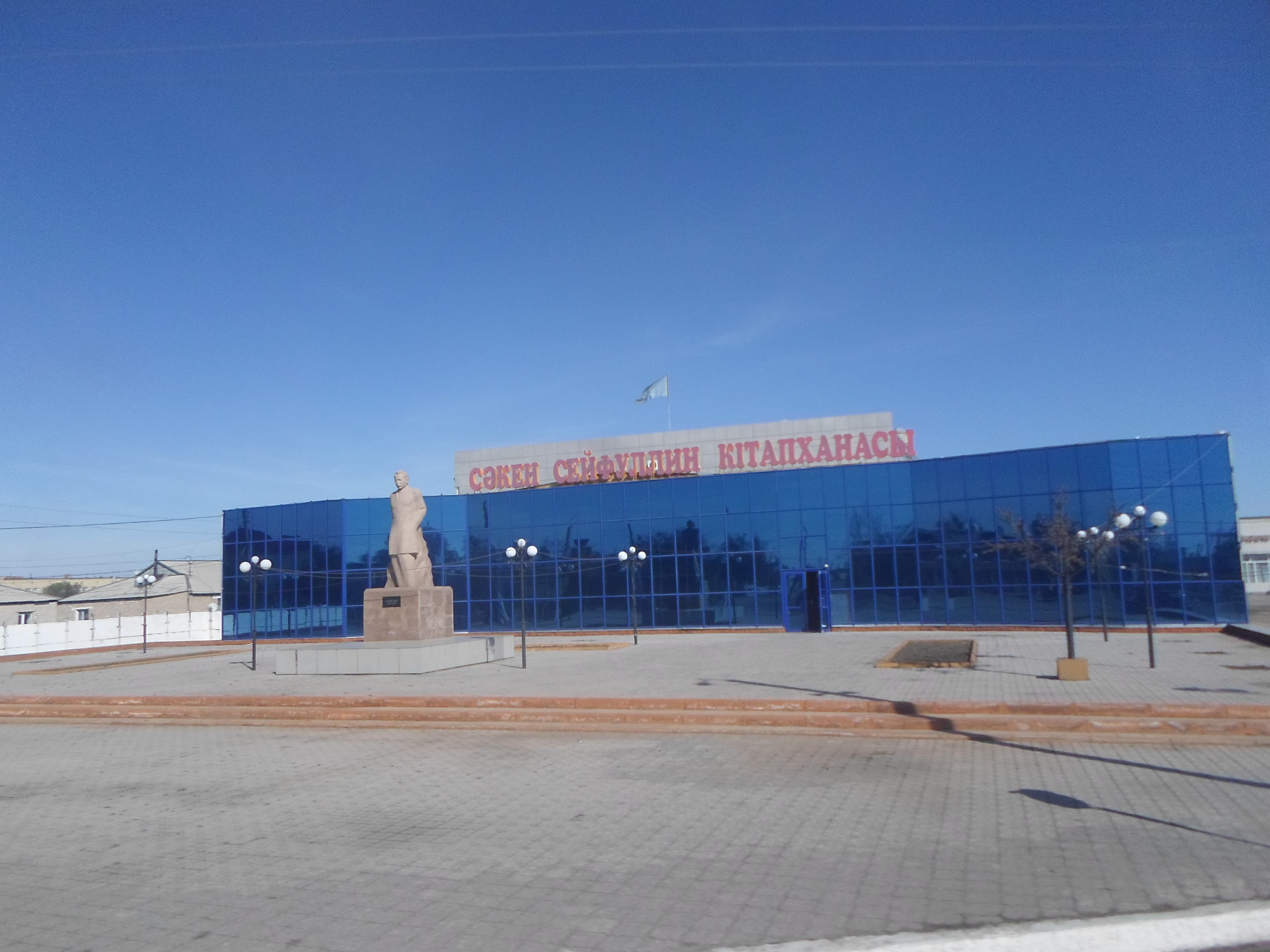
- Municipal Library

- Location in Kazakhstan
- Coordinates: 48°41′02″N 71°38′15″E
- Country: Kazakhstan
- Region: Ulytau Region
- District: Zhanaarka District

Area
  - Total: 14 km^{2} (5.4 sq mi)
- Elevation: 486 m (1,594 ft)

Population (2019)
  - Total: 17,559
- Time zone: UTC+05:00 (Kazakhstan Time)
- Postcode: 101500

Zhanaarka, (Note: Kazakh: Жаңаарқа, romanized: Jañaarqa, pronounced [ʒɑŋɑ́.ɑrqʰɑ́]; lit. 'New Back'; Russian: Жанаарка, romanized: Žanaarka, pronounced [ʐɐˌna.ɐrˈka]) known as Atasu until 2020, is a town in Zhanaarka District, Ulytau Region, Kazakhstan. It is the administrative center of the district and the only populated center of the Atasu rural district (KATO code - 354430100). Population: 14,265 (2009 census results); 14,281 (1999 census results).

== Geography ==
Zhanaarka is located 320 kilometers (200 mi) to the northeast of Zhezkazgan city, by the confluence of the Sarysu and Zhaman Sarysu rivers. Lake Koktinkoli lies 35 kilometers (22 mi) to the southeast of the town.

== Notable people ==
- Aliya Beysenova - geographer, born in 1932 in Konek, a tract in Zhanaarka
