= Telikol =

Lake in Kazakhstan

- Телікөл
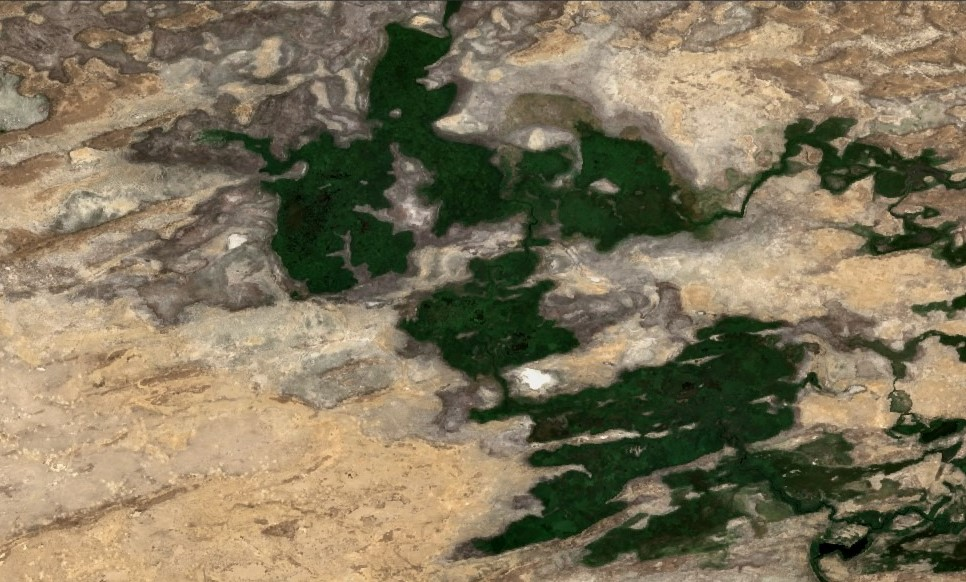
- Sentinel-2 image of the lake zone in August

- Location within Kazakhstan
- Coordinates: 45°12′N 66°34′E
- Type: Steppe lake
- Primary inflows: Sarysu
- Catchment area: 81 square kilometers (31 sq mi)
- Basin countries: Kazakhstan
- Max. length: 2.8 kilometers (1.7 mi)
- Max. width: 1.1 kilometers (0.68 mi)
- Surface area: 8 square kilometers (3.1 sq mi)
- Residence time: UTC+6
- Surface elevation: 128 meters (420 ft)

Telikol (Kazakh: Телікөл; Russian: Теликоль) is a lake in the Kyzylorda Region, Kazakhstan.

The area of the lake lies in the Syrdariya and Shieli districts. The Telikol lake zone includes a 159,320 hectares (393,700 acres) Important Bird Area.

== Geography ==
Telikol is a cluster of small lakes that lies close to the western edge of the Ashchykol Depression and east of the Daryalyktakyr plain (Дарьялыктакыр). The lakeshores are flat and wide. In years of abundant spring floods, the Sarysu river flows into the Ashchykol Depression from the north, bends westwards, and reaches the Telikol from the east. In such years the water level rises in the whole area, connecting the lakes. The lake bottom is smooth, made up of clay and silt. The 181 kilometers (112 mi) long Shieli-Telikol Canal was built for irrigation, connecting the lacustrine basin with the Syr Darya river to the south near Shieli.

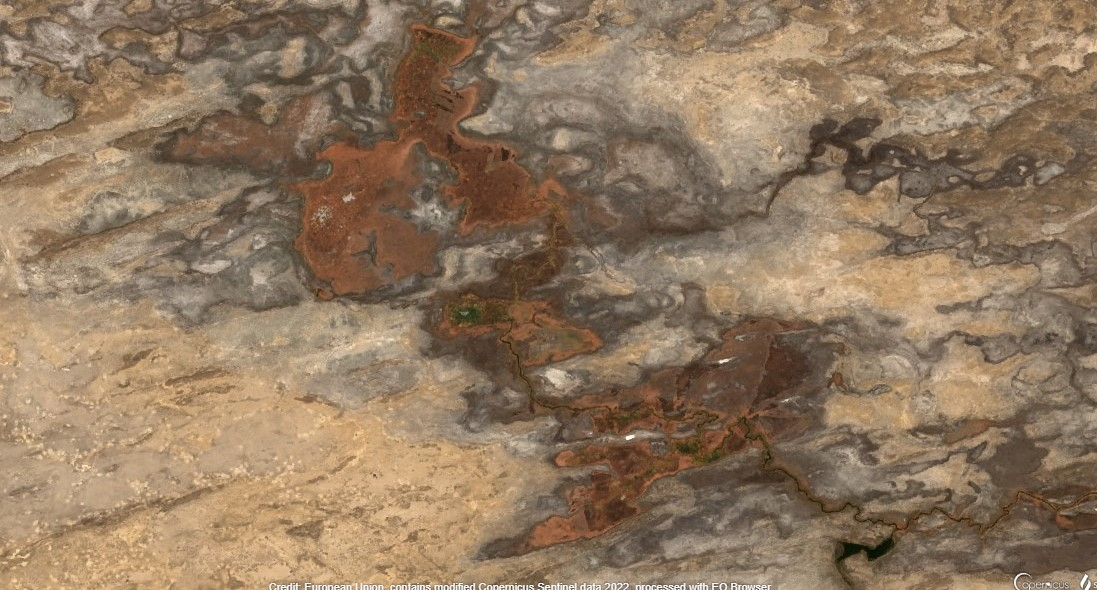
Sentinel-2 image of the dry lakes in October.

== Flora ==
The Telikol lake area has sparse vegetation made up mainly of saltwort and wormwood, as well as saxaul and tamarisk. The western stretches of the lakeshores are covered with reeds. The grassy areas near the lakes are a seasonal grazing ground for local cattle.

== See also ==
- List of lakes of Kazakhstan
