= Takir (soil) =

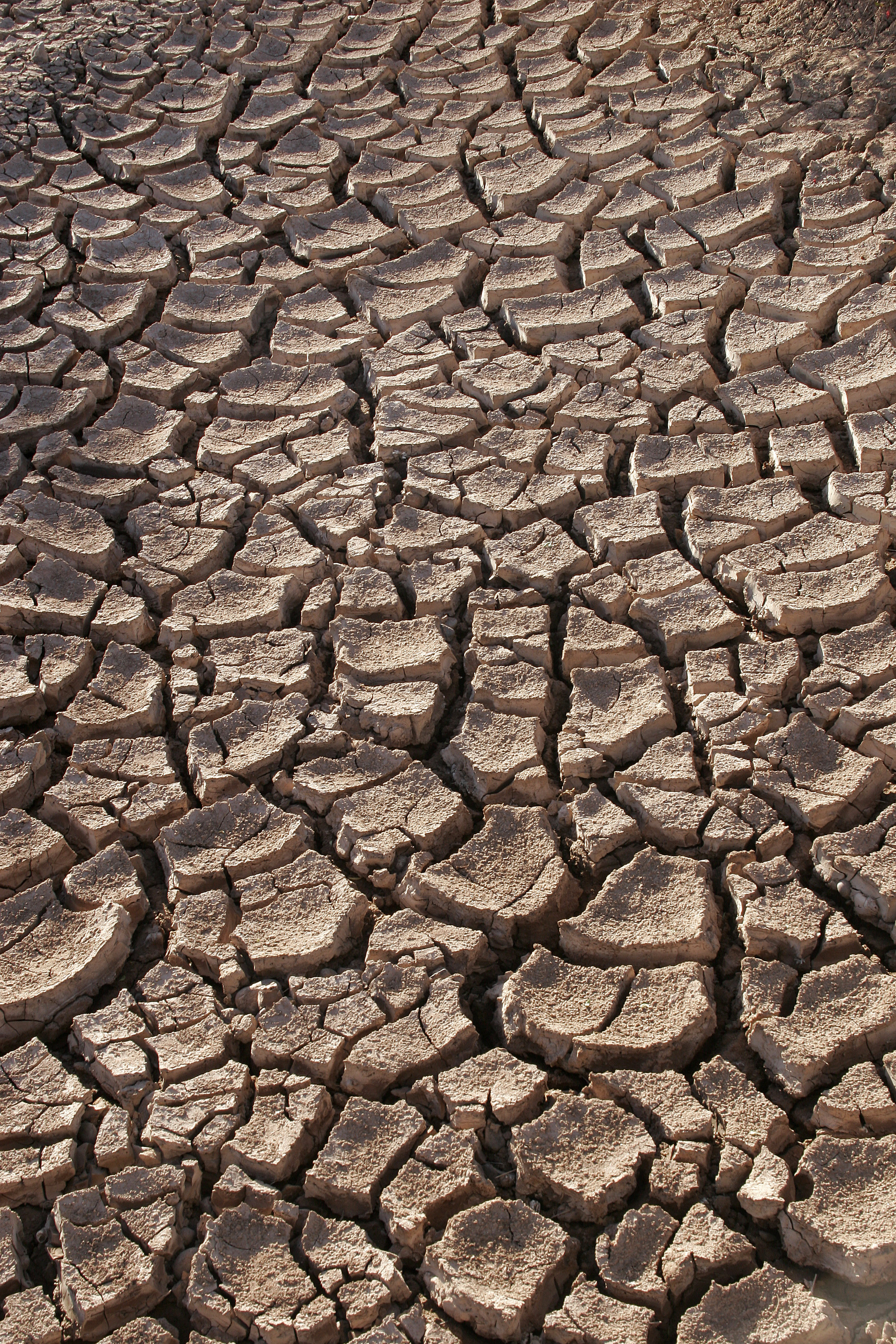
Takyr (playa) in Sonora Desert (US)

Takir (takyr) (originally from Kazakh or another Turkic language) meaning "smooth, even, or bare", is a type of relief occurring in the deserts of Central Asia, similar to a salt flat in the southwestern United States. A takyr is usually formed in a shallow depressed area with a heavy clay soil, which is submerged by water after seasonal rains. After the water evaporates, a dried crust with fissures forms on the surface. The crust is often colonized by filamentous cyanobacteria.

In the southwestern U.S. "takyrs" are known as "playas" or "salt flats", in Arab countries as "sabkha".

== See also ==
- Daryalyktakyr
