= Sarysu (river) =

Sarysu Сарысу
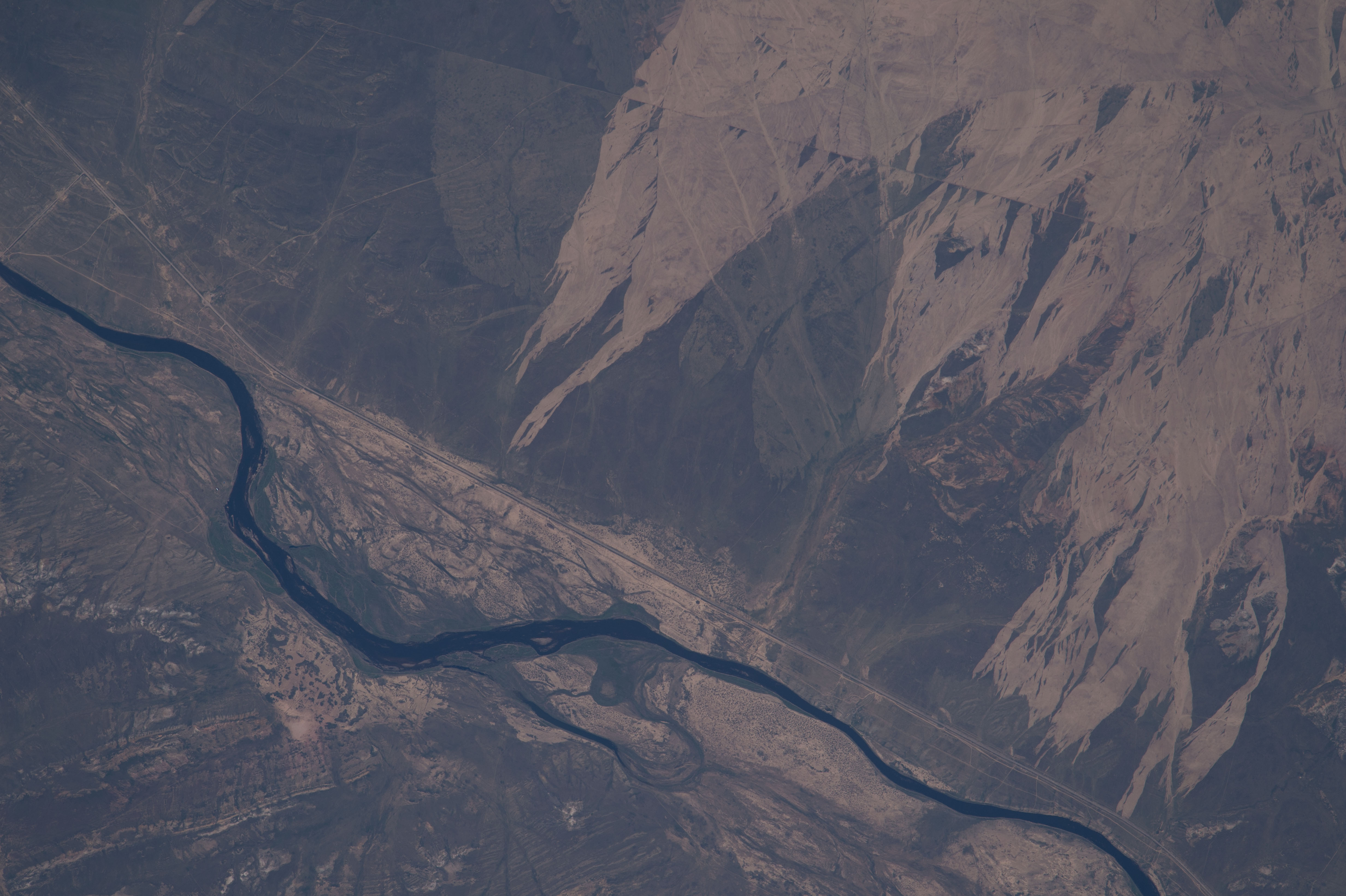
- ISS image of the river

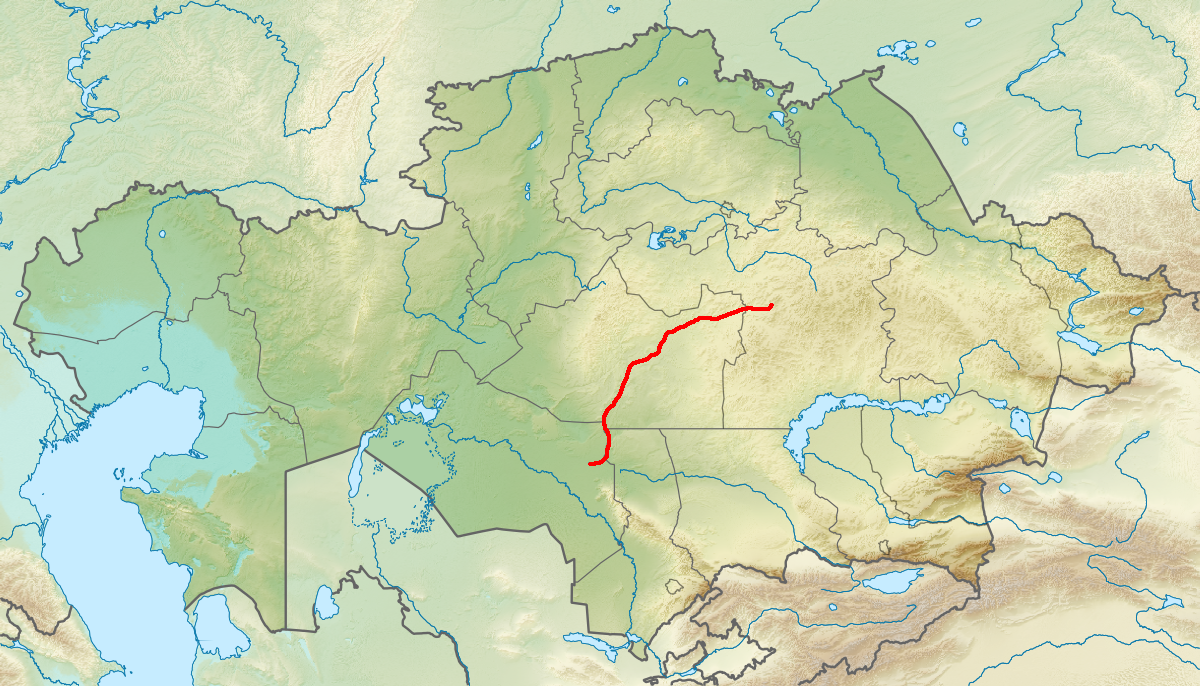
- Map showing the course of the Sarysu

Location
- Country: Kazakhstan

Physical characteristics
- Source: confluence of Zhaman-Sarysu and Zhaksy-Sarysu; Kazakh Uplands
  - coordinates: 48°40′28″N 71°35′38″E
  - elevation: 477 m (1,565 ft)
- Mouth: Telikol
  - coordinates: 45°12′39″N 66°36′28″E
  - elevation: 128 m (420 ft)
- Length: 671 km (417 mi)
- Basin size: 81,600 km^{2} (31,500 sq mi)
- Discharge
  - average: 7.3 m^{3}/s (260 cu ft/s)

Basin features
- Progression: Telikol→Shieli-Telikol Canal→Syr Darya→Aral Sea

The Sarysu (Note: Russian and Kazakh: Сарысу; lit. 'Yellowwater') is a river in Karaganda, Ulytau, Turkistan, and Kyzylorda Regions of Kazakhstan. It is 671 kilometres (417 mi) long, and has a drainage basin of 81,600 square kilometres (31,500 sq mi).

== Course ==
It arises above Zhanaarka and flows generally westward towards Kzyl-Dzhar where it turns south-westward past Birlestik and Zhanabas, then heading ever-more southerly it ends in the Telikol, across a cluster of small intermittent lakes at the western end of the Ashchykol Depression and to the east of the Dariyaly plain. River Boktykaryn runs parallel to it just before the Sarysu bends west towards the Telikol.

The main tributaries of the Sarysu are the Zhaman Sarysu, Zhaksy Sarysu, Surtisu, Atasu, Taldymanaka and Karakengir.

The 181 kilometers (112 mi) long Shieli-Telikol Canal was built for irrigation, connecting the Telikol lacustrine basin to the north with the Syr Darya river near Shieli.

== See also ==
- List of rivers of Kazakhstan
