= Ulytau Region =

Ulytau Region Ұлытау облысы (Kazakh) Улытауская область (Russian)
- Region
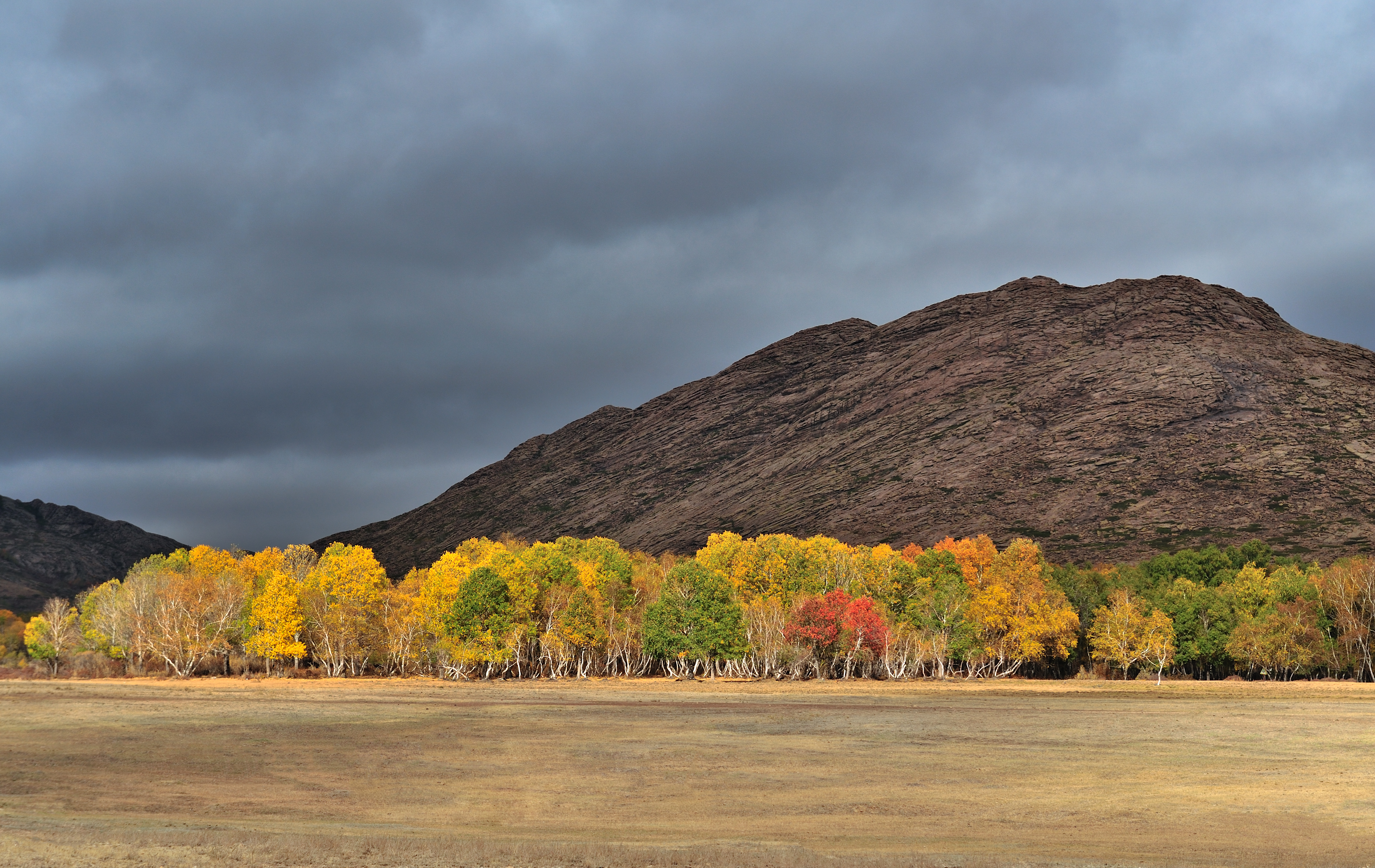
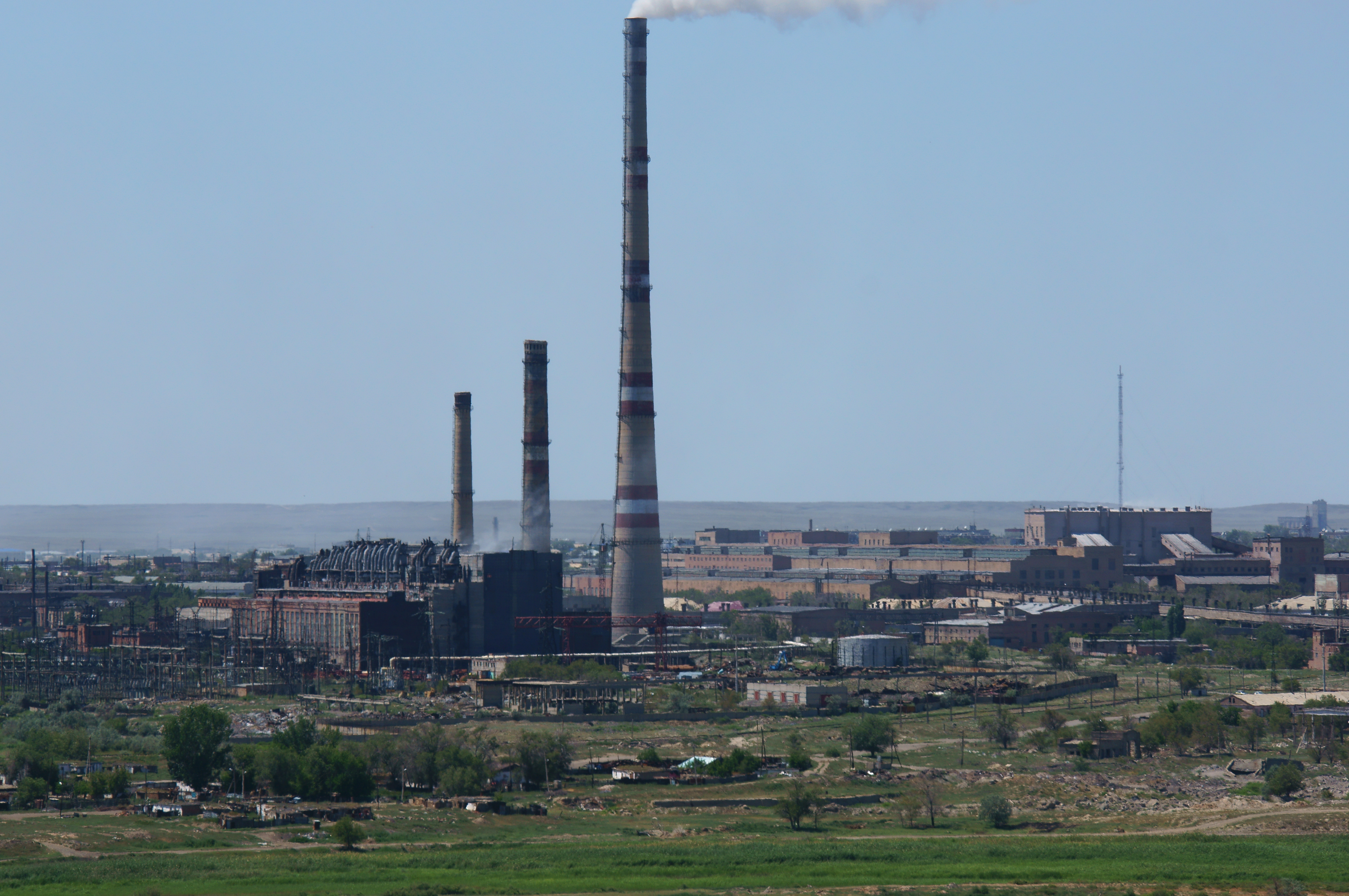
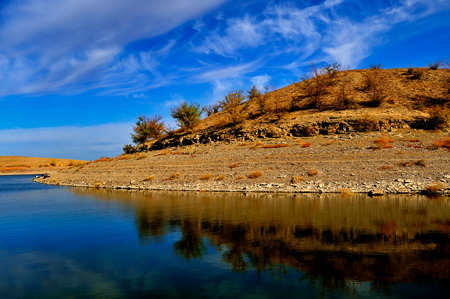
- From the top, Ulytau Sanctuary, Zhezkazgan, Kengir Reservoir

- Coat of arms

- Map of Kazakhstan, location of Ulytau Region highlighted
- Coordinates: 47°17′05″N 68°21′12″E
- Country: Kazakhstan
- Administrative center: Jezkazgan
- Established: 8 June 2022

Government
  - Äkim: Dastan Ryspekov

Area
  - Total: 188,936 km^{2} (72,949 sq mi)

Population
  - Estimate (2022): 221,014

GDP (Nominal, 2024)
  - Total: KZT 2,399 billion (US$ 5.039 billion) · 19th
  - Per capita: KZT 10,835,000 (US$ 22,754) · 3rd
- Time zone: UTC+5
- Website: www.gov.kz/memleket/entities/ulytau?lang=en

Ulytau Region (Note: Kazakh: Ұлытау облысы, romanized: Ūlytau oblysy; Russian: Улытауская область) is a region of Kazakhstan. The administrative center of the region is the city of Jezkazgan. The area split off from Karaganda Region in 2022.

The region's borders roughly correspond to the western half of the old Jezkazgan Region which was liquidated in 1997 and merged with Karaganda Region.

== History ==
Kazakh president Kassym-Jomart Tokayev announced on 16 March 2022 that the region would be created. The area split off from Karaganda Region when Tokayev's bill came into force on 8 June.

== Administrative divisions ==
- Zhanaarka District; adm. center Zhanaarka
- Ulytau District; adm. center Ulytau
- Jezkazgan city
- Karazhal city
- Satbayev city
