= Taykonyr =

Taykonyr Тайқоңыр
- Village
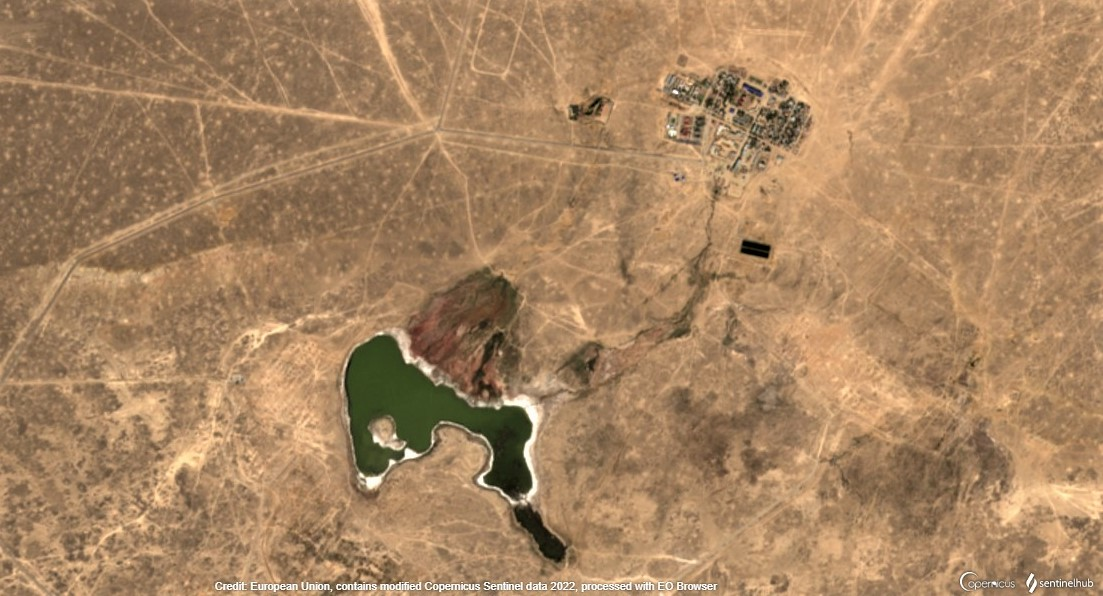
- Sentinel-2 image of the village and adjoining lake

- Location in Kazakhstan
- Coordinates: 45°12′27″N 67°32′03″E
- Country: Kazakhstan
- Region: Turkestan Region
- District: Sozak District
- Rural District: Kyzemshek Rural District

Population (2009)
  - Total: 608
- Time zone: UTC+6 (East Kazakhstan Time)

Taykonyr (Kazakh: Тайқоңыр) is a village in Sozak District in Turkestan Region of Kazakhstan. It is part of the Kyzemshek rural district (KATO code - 515645200). Population: 608 (2009 census results); 444 (1999 census results).

== Geography ==
The village lies in the Ashchykol Depression close to a small lake. The district center is the settlement of Sholakkorgan, located 243 kilometers (151 mi) to the southeast.
