= Ushbas =

River in Kazakhstan

Ushbas Үшбас
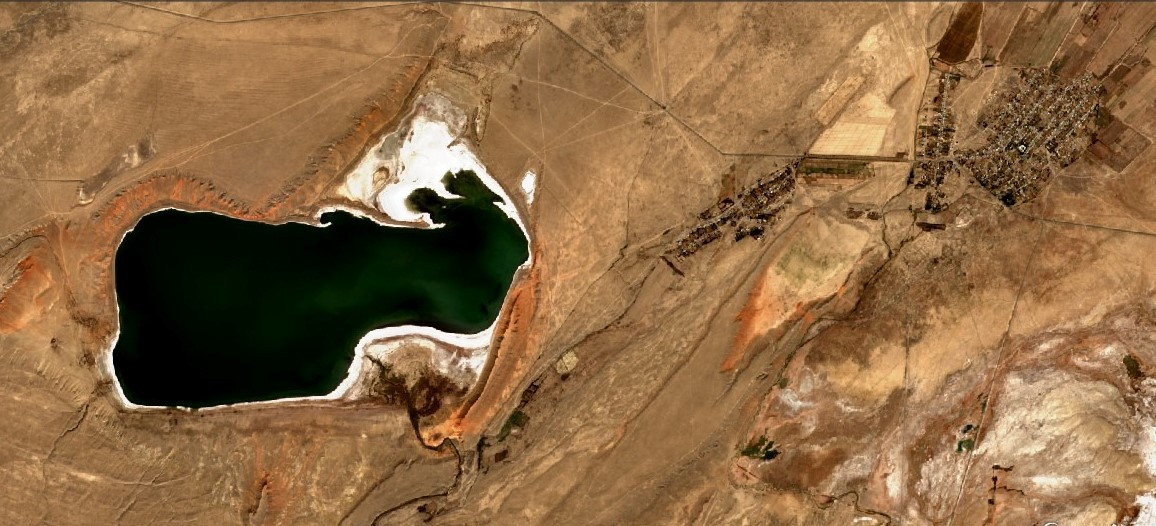
- Sentinel-2 image with the Ushbas flowing into lake Kyzylkol from the south

- Mouth location in Kazakhstan

Location
- Country: Kazakhstan

Physical characteristics
- Source: Karatau
  - coordinates: 43°19′43″N 69°43′29″E
- Mouth: Kyzylkol
  - coordinates: 43°44′40″N 69°29′52″E
  - elevation: 331 m (1,086 ft)
- Length: 71 km (44 mi)
- Basin size: 571 km^{2} (220 sq mi)
- Discharge
  - average: 0.25 m^{3}/s (8.8 cu ft/s)

The Ushbas (Kazakh: Үшбас) is a river in southern Kazakhstan. It has a length of 71 km (44 mi) and a drainage basin of 571 km^{2} (220 sq mi).

The river flows across Sarysu district of the Zhambyl Region and Sozak District of the Turkistan Region. It has its mouth near Kumkent village.

== Course ==
The Ushbas river has its origin in the northern slopes of the Karatau Range. It heads roughly northwestwards down a deep mountain valley with steep sides. In its final stretch it bends and flows roughly northwards, parallel to the Burkittі (Бүркітті), a left tributary of the Shabakty river, to the east. Finally it ends up in the southeastern shore of Kyzylkol lake.

The Ushbas is fed mainly by rain and underground water. In the summer, when the riverbed dries, the river doesn't reach Kyzylkol.

== See also ==
- List of rivers of Kazakhstan
