= Plain martin =

The plain martin has been split into two species:

- Brown-throated martin (Riparia paludicola), found in Africa and Madagascar
- Grey-throated martin (Riparia chinensis), found in Asia
