= Kyzylkol =

Lake in Kazakhstan

- Қызылкөл
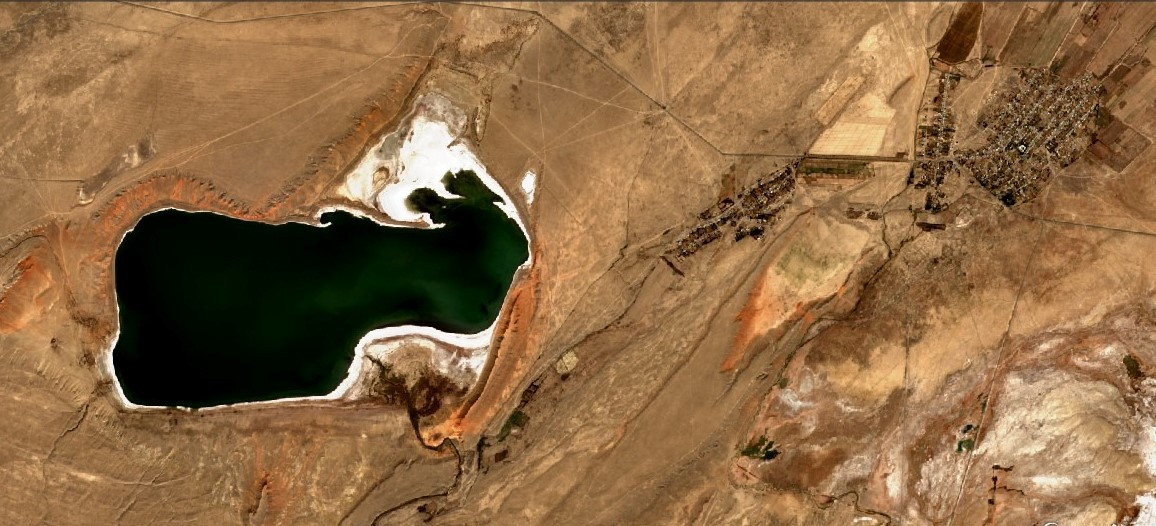
- Sentinel-2 image of the lake and Kumkent village

- Location within Kazakhstan
- Location: Near the Karatau Mountains
- Coordinates: 43°45′N 69°29′E
- Type: Endorheic lake
- Primary inflows: Ushbas
- Catchment area: 60.4 square kilometers (23.3 sq mi)
- Basin countries: Kazakhstan
- Max. length: 6.1 kilometers (3.8 mi)
- Max. width: 2.8 kilometers (1.7 mi)
- Surface area: 16.2 square kilometers (6.3 sq mi)
- Max. depth: 10 meters (33 ft)
- Shore length^{1}: 18.6 kilometers (11.6 mi)
- Surface elevation: 331 meters (1,086 ft)
- Islands: None
- ^{1} Shore length is not a well-defined measure.

Kyzylkol (Kazakh: Қызылкөл; Russian: Кызылколь) is a lake in Sozak District, Turkestan Region, Kazakhstan.

The lake lies 20 kilometers (12 mi) east of Sholakkorgan town and a little to the west of Kumkent. Kyzylkol lake is a 4,160 hectares (10,300 acres) Important Bird Area, where tens and even hundreds of thousands of birds may rest at the lake at a given time.

== Geography ==
Kyzylkol is located in an arid area to the north of the northern slopes of the Karatau Mountains. The lake has an elongated shape from east to west. It lies at the bottom of a round basin, surrounded by two terrace-like concentric strips of terrain with takir and salt marsh near the shores. The western and southern coastline is steep with loess cliffs, but to the north and east it is flat. The Ushbas river flows into the southeastern shore of the lake from the Karatau. The waters of the lake are brackish, turning to saline in the summer, when the riverbed dries and doesn't reach Kyzylkol.

Lake Akkol lies nearly 100 kilometers (62 mi) to the ESE.

== Flora and fauna ==
Semi-desert vegetation grows near Kyzylkol, with saltwort and tamarisk close to the lakeshore. Further away grow camelthorn, wormwood, common salttree and needlegrass.

The lake is an important place for the breeding, migrating and wintering of a number of water bird species, including the ruddy shelduck, northern shoveler, garganey, Eurasian teal, gadwall, mallard, common shelduck, greylag goose, little ringed plover and pale sand martin, as well as waders. The main fish species in the lake are carp and karabalik.

== See also ==
- List of lakes of Kazakhstan
