= Ashchykol (disambiguation) =

Ashchykol (Kazakh: Ащыкөл; "bitter lake") may refer to:

- Ashchykol a lake group in the Kyzylorda and Turkistan regions, Kazakhstan
- Ashchykol, Jambyl Region, a lake in the Sarysu and Talas districts, Jambyl Region, Kazakhstan
- Ashchykol, another name for lake Saumalkol, Bukhar-Zhyrau District, Karaganda Region, Kazakhstan
- Ashchykol Depression, a depression in the Turkistan and Kyzylorda regions, Kazakhstan
