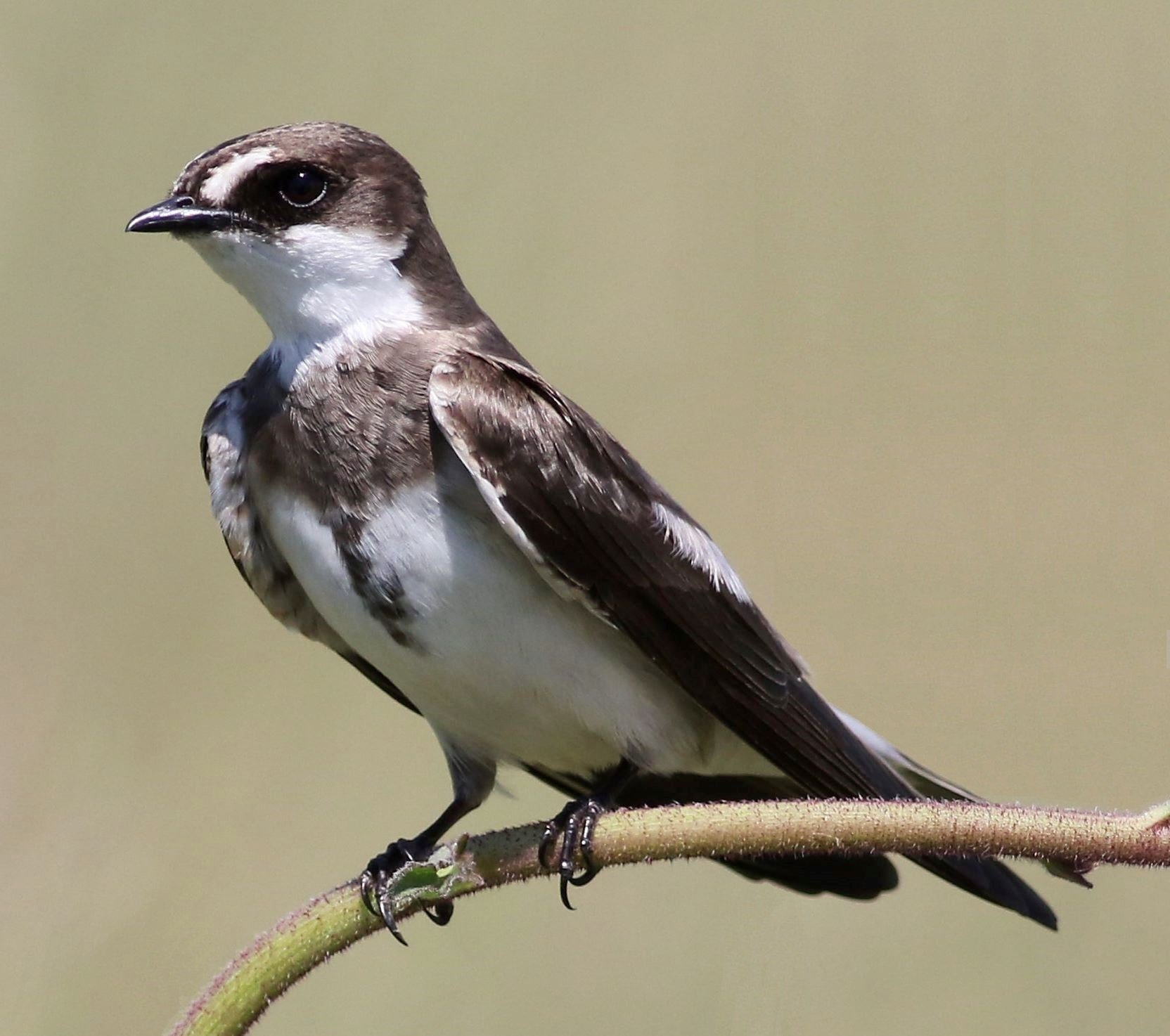
- Nominate subspecies at Rietvlei in Pretoria

Conservation status
- Least Concern (IUCN 3.1)

Scientific classification
- Kingdom: Animalia
- Phylum: Chordata
- Class: Aves
- Order: Passeriformes
- Family: Hirundinidae
- Genus: Neophedina; Roberts, 1922
- Species: N. cincta

Binomial name
- Neophedina cincta (Boddaert, 1783)
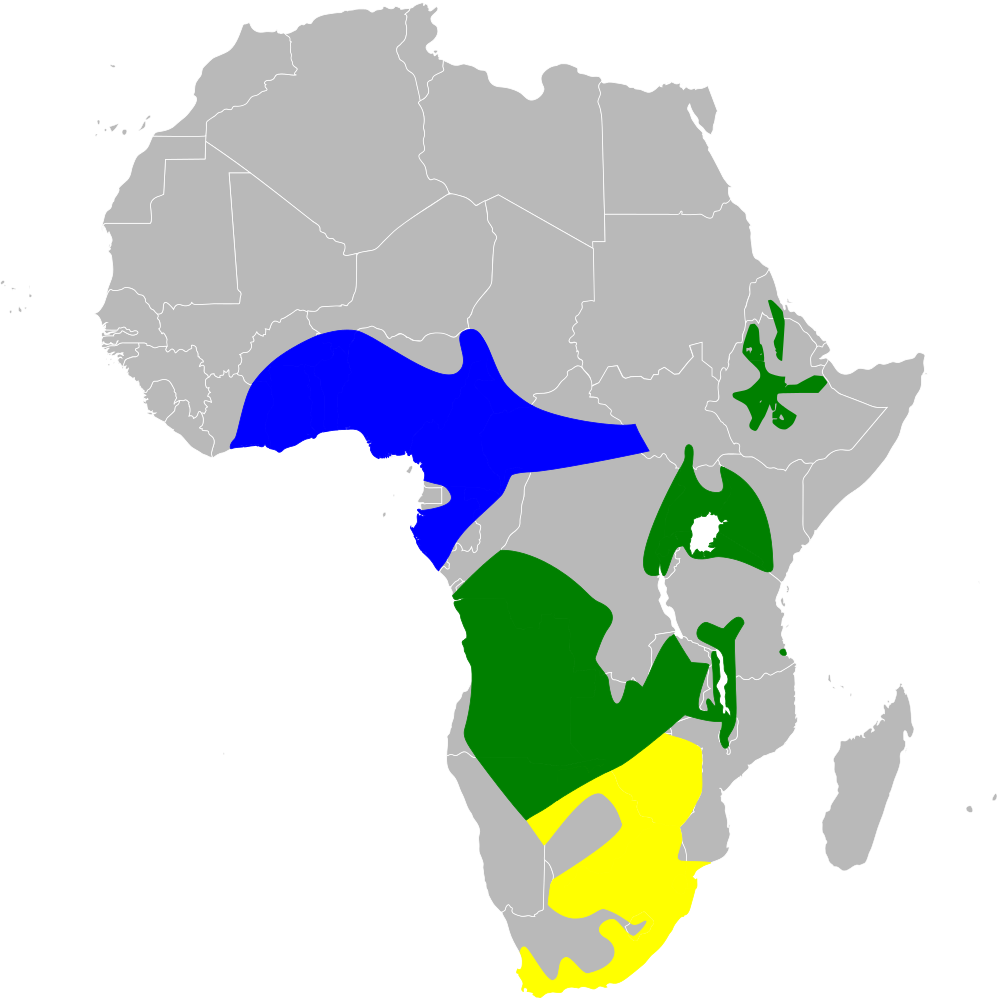
- resident breeding visitor non-breeding visitor

= Banded martin =

Species of bird

The banded martin or banded sand martin (Neophedina cincta) is a small passerine bird in the swallow family Hirundinidae that is endemic to Africa. It is the only species placed in the genus Neophedina.

== Taxonomy ==
The banded martin was described by the French polymath Georges-Louis Leclerc, Comte de Buffon in 1780 in his Histoire Naturelle des Oiseaux from a specimen collected from the Cape of Good Hope. The bird was also illustrated in a hand-coloured plate engraved by François-Nicolas Martinet in the Planches Enluminées D'Histoire Naturelle which was produced under the supervision of Edme-Louis Daubenton to accompany Buffon's text. Neither the plate caption nor Buffon's description included a scientific name but in 1783 the Dutch naturalist Pieter Boddaert coined the binomial name Hirundo cincta in his catalogue of the Planches Enluminées.

The banded martin was formerly placed in the genus Riparia. A genetic study found that it belonged to a different clade to other members of the genus, and it was moved to the genus Neophedina that had been introduced in 1922 by the South African zoologist Austin Roberts. The specific epithet cincta is from Latin cinctus meaning "banded".

Five subspecies are recognised:

- N. c. erlangeri (Reichenow, 1905) — Ethiopia
- N. c. suahelica van Someren, 1922 — south Sudan and west Kenya to north Zimbabwe and west Mozambique
- N. c. parvula Amadon, 1954 — north Angola, southwest DR Congo and northwest Zambia
- N. c. xerica Clancey & Irwin, 1966 — west and south Angola, north Namibia and north Botswana
- N. c. cincta (Boddaert, 1783) — southeast Botswana, south Zimbabwe and South Africa

== Description ==
The 15–17 cm (5.9–6.7 in) long banded martin has earth-brown upper parts, except for a white stripe above the eye. Its underparts are white, as are the underwing coverts, and it has a dark brown breast band, and sometimes a thin dark line across the vent. Sexes are similar, but the young have a paler breast band and golden tips to the upper part feathers.

It is easily distinguished from the smaller sand martin by its square tail and white on the underwings, and from the brown-throated sand martin by its white throat. It is less gregarious than those species, and is typically seen in pairs or small flocks.

The subspecies differ in size and in the plumage tones of the upper parts or breast band. The nominate R. c. cincta of southern Africa is the palest form.

== Distribution and habitat ==
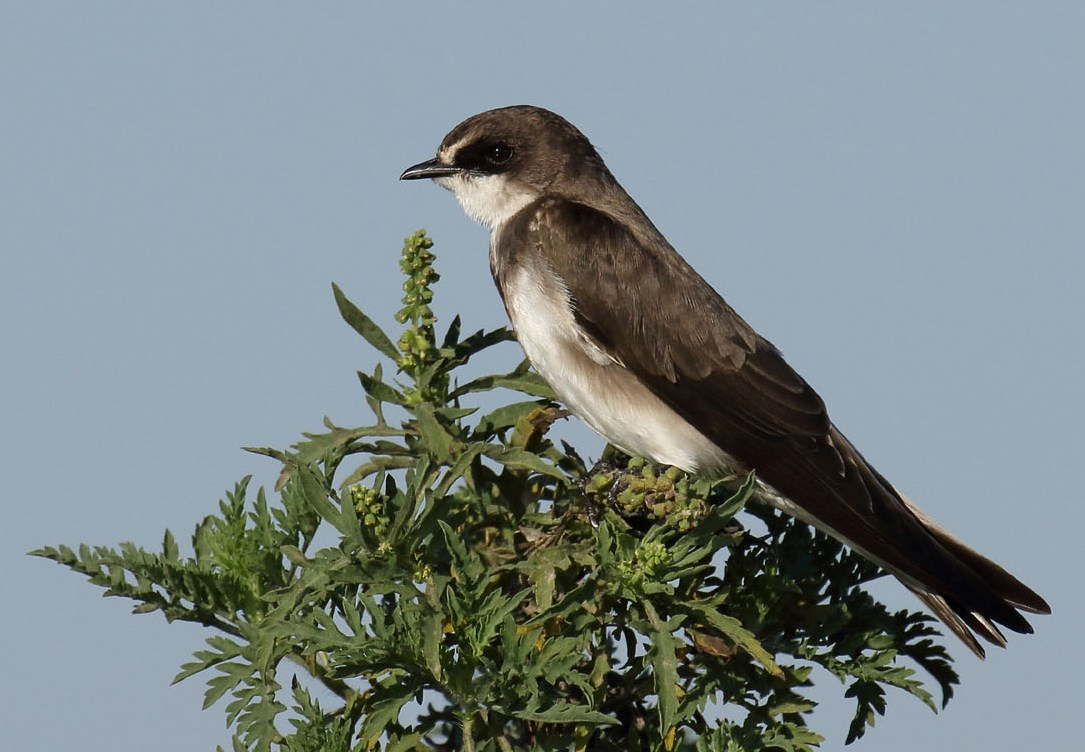
At the Bangweulu Wetlands in Zambia

The banded martin is found in open habitats such as farmland, grassland and savannah, usually near water. It breeds across Africa from Cameroon and Zaire to Ethiopia south to the Cape in South Africa, although it is absent from the driest regions of western South Africa and southern Namibia.

The southern nominate subspecies of South Africa and Zimbabwe, is migratory, wintering further north, particularly in the west, where it can move sometimes as far as Gambia. N. c. xerica also leaves its drier breeding grounds in Botswana and northern Namibia in the southern winter. Other subspecies undertake local or altitudinal movements often dependent on the rainfall pattern.

== Behaviour and ecology ==
This species has a slow erratic flight and frequently perches. Its diet consists of insects, usually taken in flight over grassland. The flight call is che-che-che, and the song is a twittering jumble of chip choop sounds.

The banded martin, unlike the other members of its genus, is not colonial in its nesting habits. Its nest is at the end of a 60–90 cm (24–35 in) long tunnel usually excavated by the birds in a natural sand bank or earth mound. The actual nest is a litter of straw and feathers in a chamber at the end of the burrow. The two to five white eggs are incubated by both parents.
