= Bitter Lake =

Bitter Lake may refer to:

== Places ==
- Bitter Lake (Ontario), Canada
- Great Bitter Lake, Egypt
  - Battle of Bitter Lakes, a 925 BCE conflict

=== United States ===
- Bitter Lake (Day County, South Dakota)
- Bitter Lake (Miner County, South Dakota)
- Bitter Lake (Seattle), a lake in Washington
  - Bitter Lake, Seattle, a neighborhood surrounding the lake

== Other uses ==
- Bitter Lake (film), a 2015 BBC documentary film by Adam Curtis
- Bitter Lake National Wildlife Refuge, a refuge in New Mexico

== See also ==
Places with names meaning "bitter lake" in other languages:

- Lake Acıgöl, a lake in Turkey
- Lake Magadi, a lake in Kenya
- Lake Pikrolimni, a lake in Greece
- Ashchykol (disambiguation), Kazakhstan
- Gorkoye, lakes in Russia
