= Sozak =

Sozak Sozaq
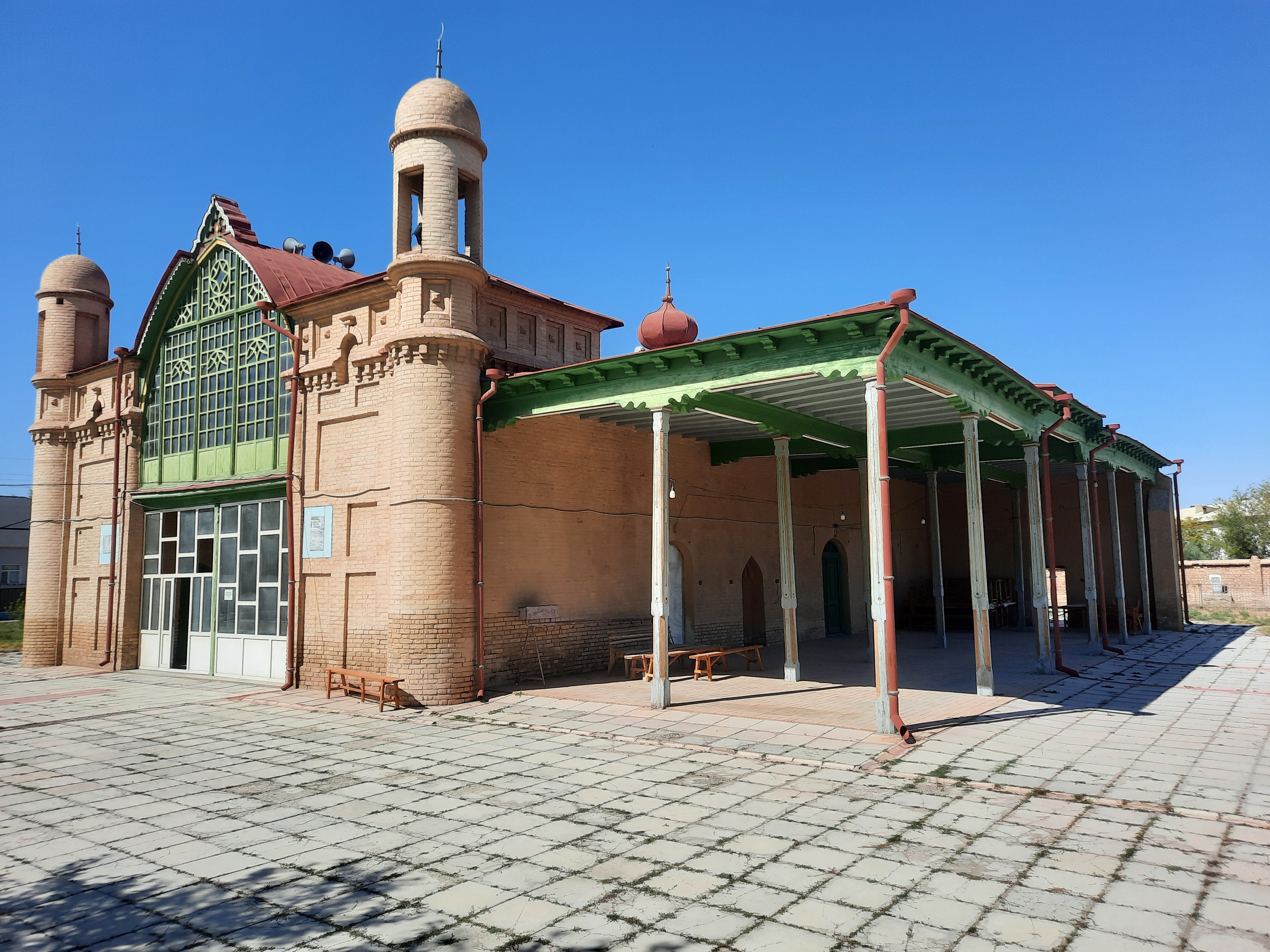
- Mosque in Sozak

- Location in Kazakhstan
- Coordinates: 44°08′N 68°28′E
- Country: Kazakhstan
- Region: Turkistan Region
- District: Sozak District

Population
  - Total: 4,335
- Time zone: UTC+5 (UTC+5)
- Climate: BWk

Sozak, or Sozaq (Kazakh: Созақ, Sozaq, سوزاق, also Russified Suzak), is a village in Sozak District, Turkistan Region, in southern Kazakhstan.

== History ==
Sozaq was the capital of the Kazakh Khanate from c. 1465-1469. The ancient settlement of Sozak dates from the 10th to the 18th centuries and occupies an area of about 19 hectares. In historical documents from the 13th century, it is mentioned as Khuzak, and in the 16th century, it appeared under the name Suzak in connection with the struggle between the Kazakh khans, Timurids, and Sheibanids over the Syr-Darya cities. In February 1930, there was an anti-Soviet insurgency in the village, following which the administrative center of the district was transferred to the village of Sholakkorgan.

== Notable sites ==
- Ancient settlement of Sozak (X-XVIII centuries) - The archaeological remnants of the ancient settlement can be found in the central, historical part of the village. The excavations have revealed five construction horizons, the oldest of which dates back as far as the 10th-11th centuries. The finds include copper coins, pots, and remains of structures.
- Azhe Ata Mausoleum - Located on the western part of the ancient settlement, this mausoleum dates from the end of the 19th century and is built of adobe bricks.
