= Akzhaykyn =

Lake in Kazakhstan

- Ақжайқын
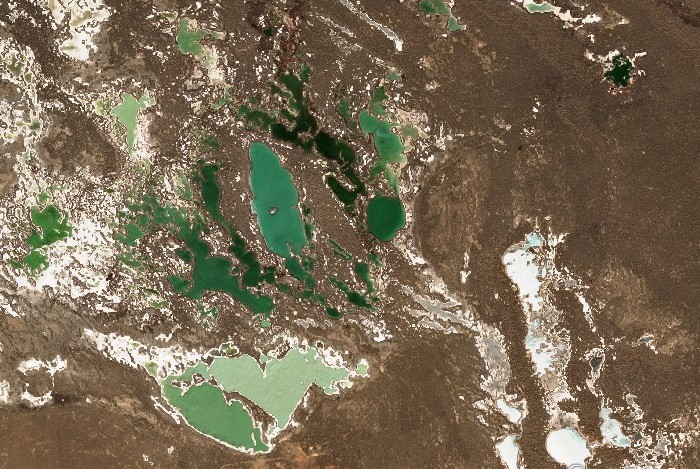
- Sentinel-2 image of the lake cluster

- Location within Kazakhstan
- Location: Ashchykol Depression
- Coordinates: 44°54′30″N 67°47′00″E
- Type: Endorheic lake
- Primary inflows: Chu
- Primary outflows: none
- Basin countries: Kazakhstan
- Surface area: 48.2 square kilometers (18.6 sq mi)
- Average depth: 3 meters (9.8 ft)
- Surface elevation: 130 meters (430 ft)

Akzhaykyn (Kazakh: Ақжайқын; Russian: Акжайкын) is a salt lake group in Sozak District, Turkistan Region, Kazakhstan.

Akzhaykyn is one of the main lakes of the Ashchykol Depression. There used to be fisheries in the lake in 1965—1967, at the time of the Kazakh SSR.

== Geography ==
Akzhaykyn is located in the Ashchykol Depression, a largely flat arid region dominated by salt marshes and salt flats. In years of sufficient rain the Chu river flows from the east into it. The Ashchykol lake cluster is located to the WNW. Both lake groups are part of the Important Bird Area "Lakes in the lower reaches of the Chu River".

The shores of Akzhaykyn are flat and sandy. The core lake is round and relatively deep, but the extensive cluster of shallower lakes surrounding it become dry after the flood season that follows the melting of the snows. There are no settlements near the lake.

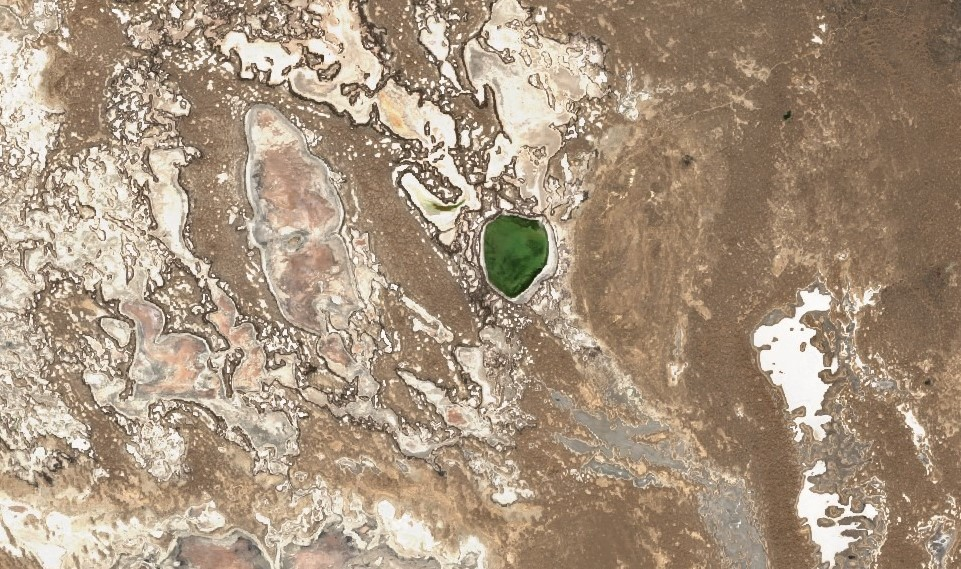
Sentinel-2 image of the lake group in June 2022.

== See also ==
- List of lakes of Kazakhstan
- Sor (geomorphology)
