= Boktykaryn =

River in Kazakhstan

Boktykaryn Боқтықарын
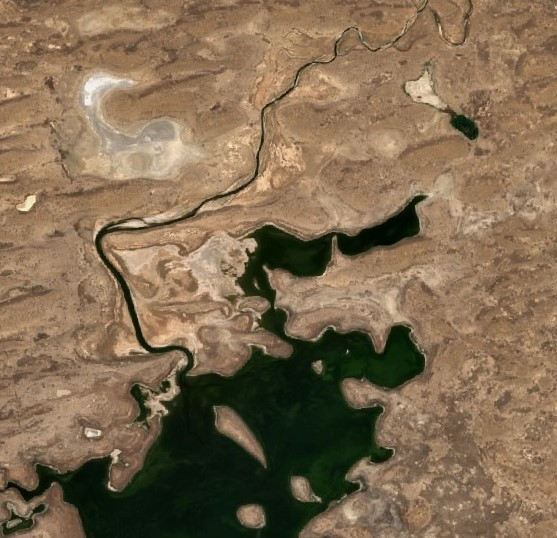
- Final stretch of the river and its mouth in the Ashchykol lakeshore Sentinel-2 image

- Mouth location in Kazakhstan

Location
- Countries: Kazakhstan

Physical characteristics
- Source: Betpak Dala
- Mouth: Ashchykol
  - coordinates: 45°10′34″N 67°17′26″E
- Length: 123 km (76 mi)

The Boktykaryn (Kazakh: Боқтықарын) is a river in Sozak District, Turkistan Region, Kazakhstan. It is 123 kilometres (76 mi) long.

The river basin is used for watering livestock grazing in the surrounding area.

== Course ==
The Boktykaryn has its sources in an artesian aquifer area of the western sector of the Betpak Dala. It heads roughly southwards, about 8 km (5.0 mi) to the east of the Sarysu river. The Boktykaryn runs parallel to the Sarysu channel for most of its course until in its last stretch it bends southwestwards, and then again southwards shortly before its mouth. Finally, it reaches intermittent lake Ashchykol of the Ashchykol Depression and enters it from the northern end.

The river is fed by snow and dries up in the summer months.

== See also ==
- List of rivers of Kazakhstan
