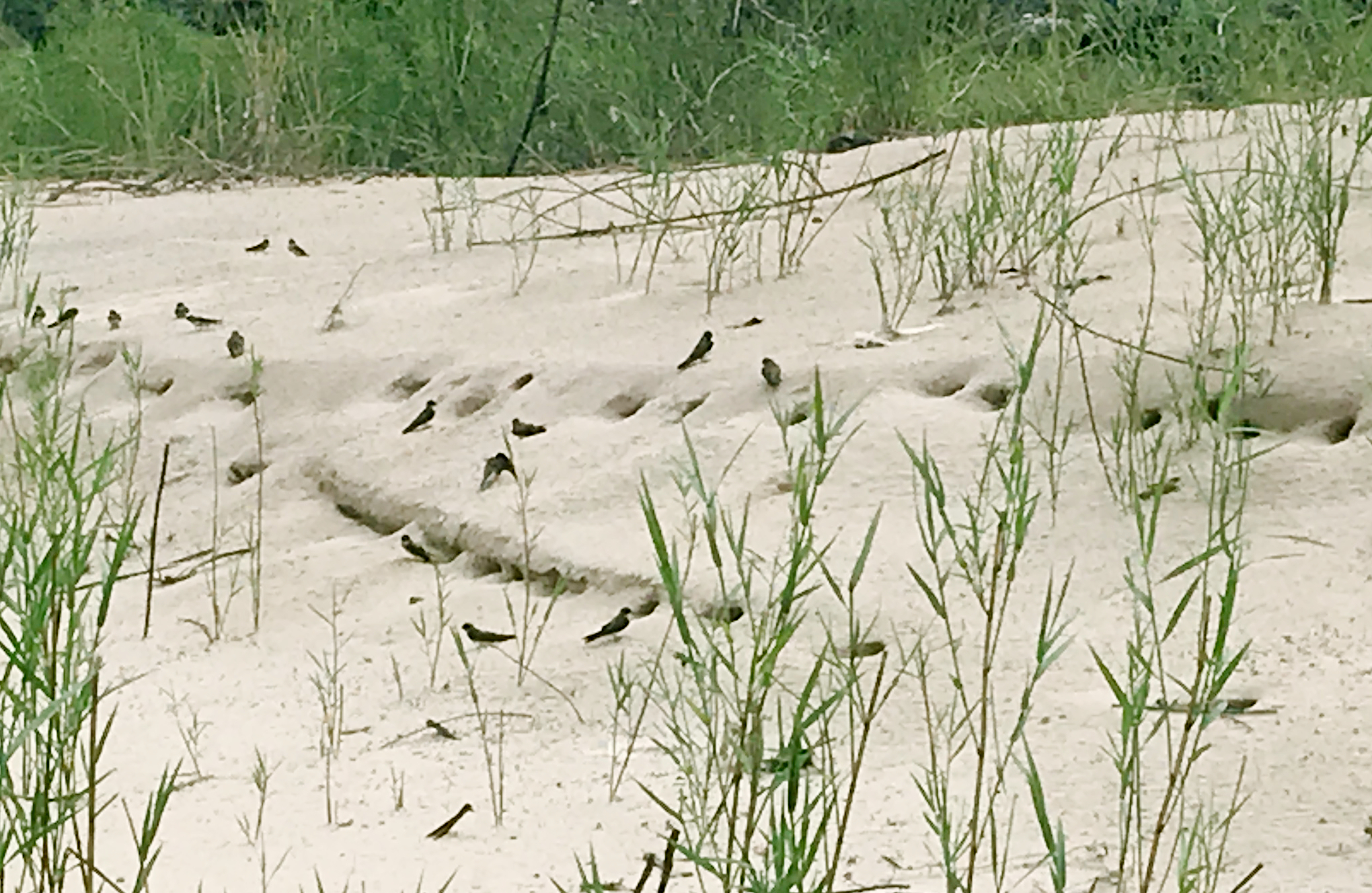

Conservation status
- Least Concern (IUCN 3.1)

Scientific classification
- Kingdom: Animalia
- Phylum: Chordata
- Class: Aves
- Order: Passeriformes
- Family: Hirundinidae
- Genus: Riparia
- Species: R. congica

Binomial name
- Riparia congica (Reichenow, 1888)

= Congo martin =

Species of bird

The Congo martin or Congo sand martin (Riparia congica) is a small passerine bird in the swallow family.

It occurs only along the Congo River and its tributary, the Ubangi. It is fairly abundant within its restricted range.

The habitat requirement of this non-migratory species is forested rivers with sandbanks for breeding.

The Congo martin nests in colonies during February and March, with each pair excavating a tunnel in a sandbank about 1 m above the river. The nest itself is at the end of the tunnel. Little is known of the breeding biology, although it is probably similar to that of the sand martin.

== Description ==
The 11 cm long Congo martin is light brown above with a slightly darker crown and wings. It has a dark line through the eye. The underside of the body is white except for a pale brown breast. It does not have the distinct narrow breast band shown by the sand martin. The bill is black and the legs are brown. Sexes are similar, but the young have pale tips to the feathers on the back, rump and wings.

The call has not been recorded.

Although the indistinct breast band of the Congo martin is different from the clearly defined markings of the sand martin, in practice it is not easy to distinguish the resident species from the winter migrant.

== Behaviour ==
The food of this species consists of small insects, such as gnats and other flies, caught on the wing over the river or in clearings and other open areas within a few miles of it. It feeds in small flocks or with other swallows, especially wintering sand martins.

== Conservation status ==
This locally abundant species has a range with an estimated extent of 80,000 km^{2}. The population size is believed to be large, and the species is not believed to approach the thresholds for the population decline criterion of the IUCN Red List (i.e. declining more than 30% in ten years or three generations). For these reasons, the species is evaluated as Least Concern.
