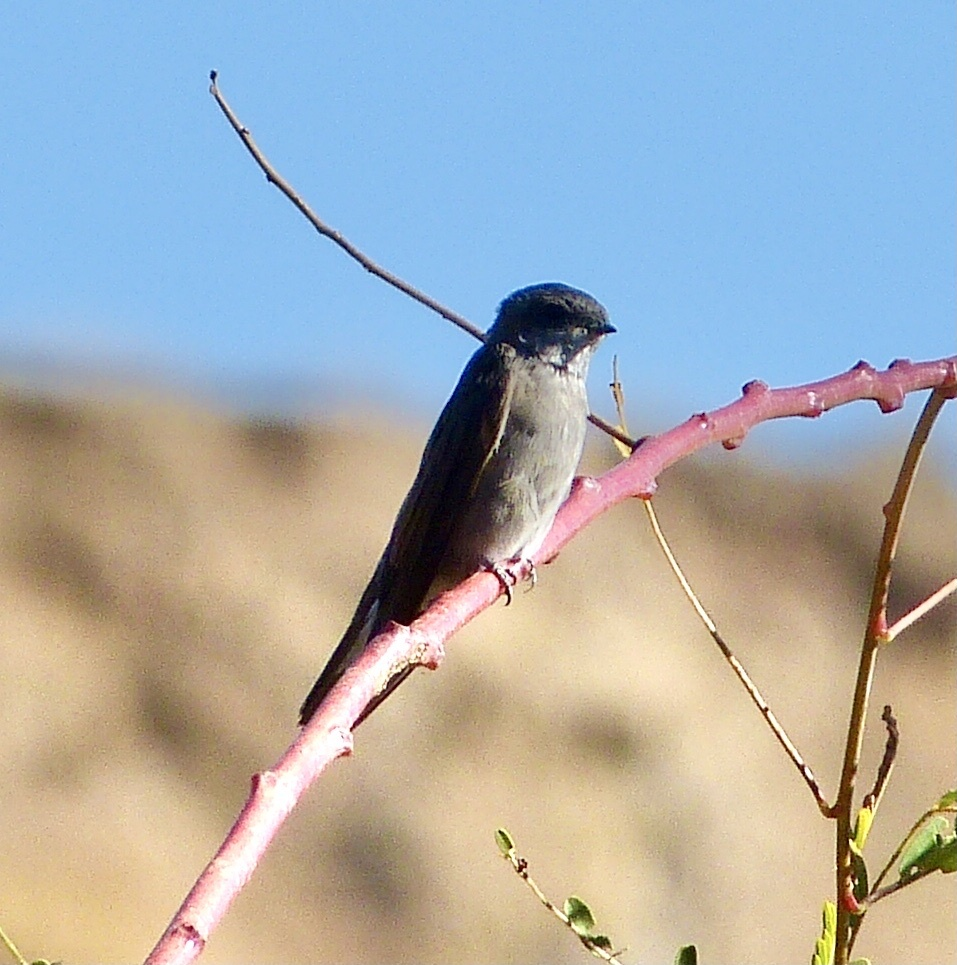

Conservation status
- Least Concern (IUCN 3.1)

Scientific classification
- Kingdom: Animalia
- Phylum: Chordata
- Class: Aves
- Order: Passeriformes
- Family: Hirundinidae
- Genus: Riparia
- Species: R. cowani

Binomial name
- Riparia cowani (Sharpe, 1882)

= Madagascar martin =

Species of bird

The Madagascar martin (Riparia cowani) is a small passerine bird in the swallow family Hirundinidae that is found in montane Madagascar. It was formerly considered to be a subspecies of the brown-throated martin (Riparia paludicola).

== Taxonomy ==
The Madagascar martin was formally described in 1882 by the English ornithologist Richard Bowdler Sharpe based on specimens collected by the Scottish naturalist William Deans Cowan in montane southeast Madagascar. Sharpe coined the binomial name Cotile cowani, choosing the specific epithet to honour the collector. It is now one of six martins placed in the genus Riparia that was introduced in 1817 by the German naturalist Johann Reinhold Forster. The Madagascar martin was formerly considered to be conspecific with the brown-throated martin (Riparia paludicola) but was split based on the different morphology and vocalization. The species is monotypic: no subspecies are recognised.
