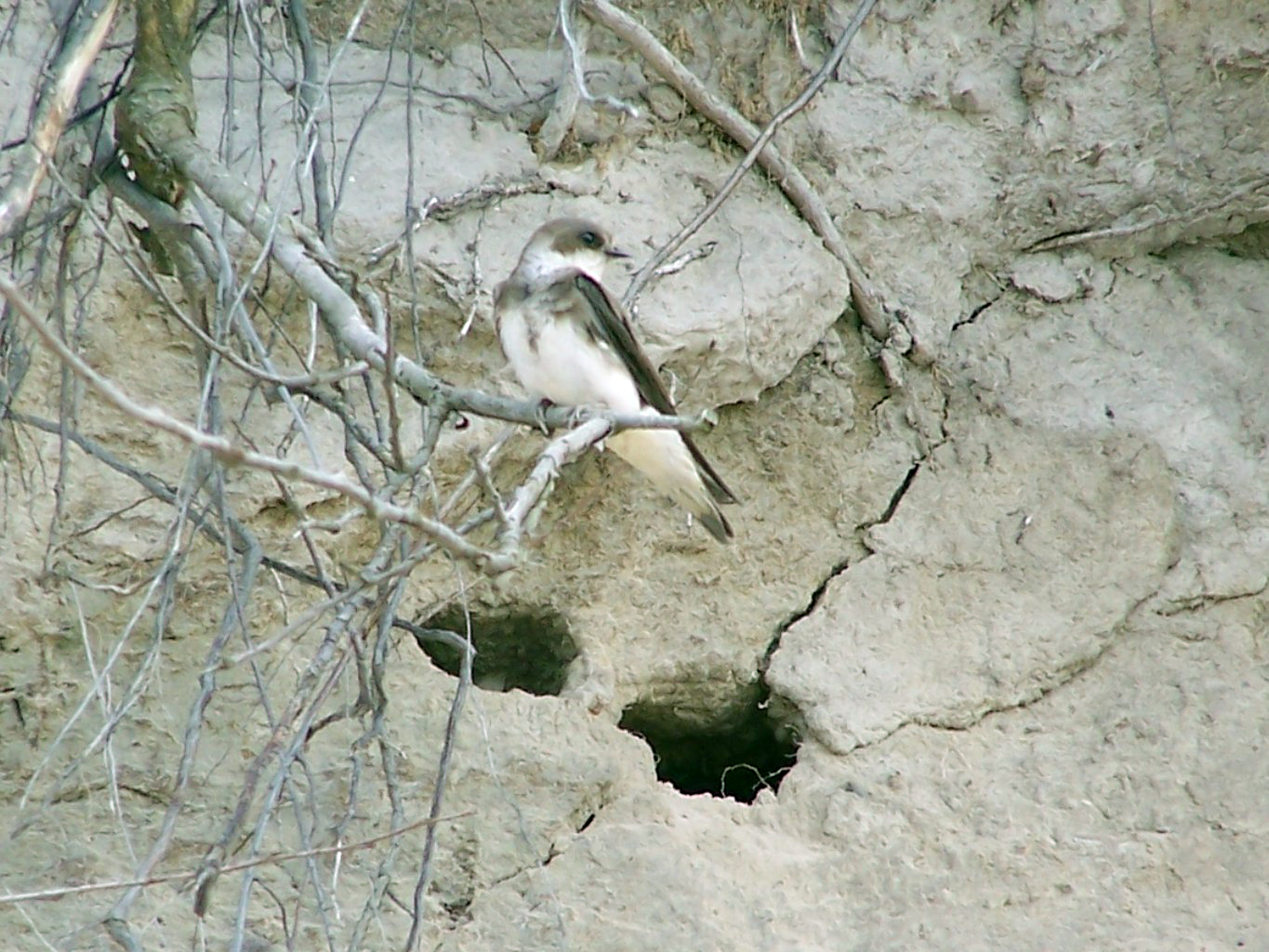
- Sand martin (Riparia riparia)

Scientific classification
- Kingdom: Animalia
- Phylum: Chordata
- Class: Aves
- Order: Passeriformes
- Family: Hirundinidae
- Subfamily: Hirundininae
- Genus: Riparia; T. Forster, 1817

Type species
- Riparia europaea = Hirundo riparia T. Forster, 1817

Species
- R. paludicola R. chinensis R. congica R. riparia R. diluta

= Riparia =

Genus of birds

Riparia is a genus of passerine birds in the swallow family Hirundinidae.

These are small or medium-sized swallows, ranging from 11 to 17 cm (4.3 to 6.7 in) in length. They are brown above and mainly white below, and all have a dark breast band. They are closely associated with water. They nest in tunnels which are usually excavated by the birds themselves in a natural sand bank or earth mound. They lay white eggs, which are incubated by both parents, in a nest of straw, grass, and feathers in a chamber at the end of the burrow. Some species breed colonially.

The cosmopolitan sand martin is almost completely migratory, breeding across temperate Eurasia and North America and wintering in the tropics. The other species are partial migrants or resident. Riparia martins, like other swallows, take insects in flight over water, grassland, or other open country.

== Taxonomy ==
The genus Riparia was introduced by the German naturalist Johann Reinhold Forster in 1817 with the sand martin (Riparia riparia) as the type species. The genus name is from the Latin riparius which means "of the riverbank"; it is derived from the Latin ripa "riverbank".

The genus contains the following six species:

Image	Common name	Scientific name	Distribution
	Brown-throated martin	Riparia paludicola (Vieillot, 1817)	Africa
	Madagascar martin	Riparia cowani (Sharpe, 1882)	Madagascar
	Grey-throated martin	Riparia chinensis (J.E. Gray, 1830)	Tajikistan, Afghanistan and Indian subcontinent to southern China, Taiwan, and the northern Philippines
	Congo martin	Riparia congica (Reichenow, 1887)	Congo River and its tributary, the Ubangi.
	Sand martin or bank swallow	Riparia riparia (Linnaeus, 1758)	Breeding season: practically the whole of Europe and the Mediterranean countries, part of northern Asia and also North America. Non-breeding: eastern and southern Africa, South America and the Indian Subcontinent
	Pale martin or pale sand martin	Riparia diluta (Sharpe & Wyatt, 1893)	Central Asia to southeastern China

The genus formerly included the banded martin but this species is now placed in its own genus Neophedina.

=== Fossil record ===
- Riparia minor (late Miocene of Polgardi, Hungary)
