= Gorkoye =

Gorkoye (Russian: Горькое; "bitter") may refer to:

- Gorkoye (Altai Krai), a village in Uglovsky District, Altai Krai, Russia
- Gorkoye (Chernokurynskoye), a lake in Mamontovsky, Novichikhinsky and Romanovsky districts, Altai Krai
- Gorkoye (Novichikhinsky District), a lake in Novichikhinsky District, Altai Krai
- Gorkoye (Novosibirsk Oblast), a lake in Bagansky and Kupinsky districts, Novosibirsk Oblast
- Gorkoye (Romanovsky District), a lake in Romanovsky District, Altai Krai
- Gorkoye (Rubtsovsky District), a lake in Rubtsovsky District, Altai Krai
- Gorkoye (Tyumentsevsky District), a lake in Tyumentsevsky District, Altai Krai
- Gorkoye (Yegoryevsky District), a lake in Yegoryevsky District, Altai Krai
- Gorkoye-Peresheyechnoye, a lake in Yegoryevsky District, Altai Krai
- Kelty Gorkoye, a lake in Kulundinsky District, Altai Krai
