= Ashchykol =

Lake in Kazakhstan

- Ащыкөл
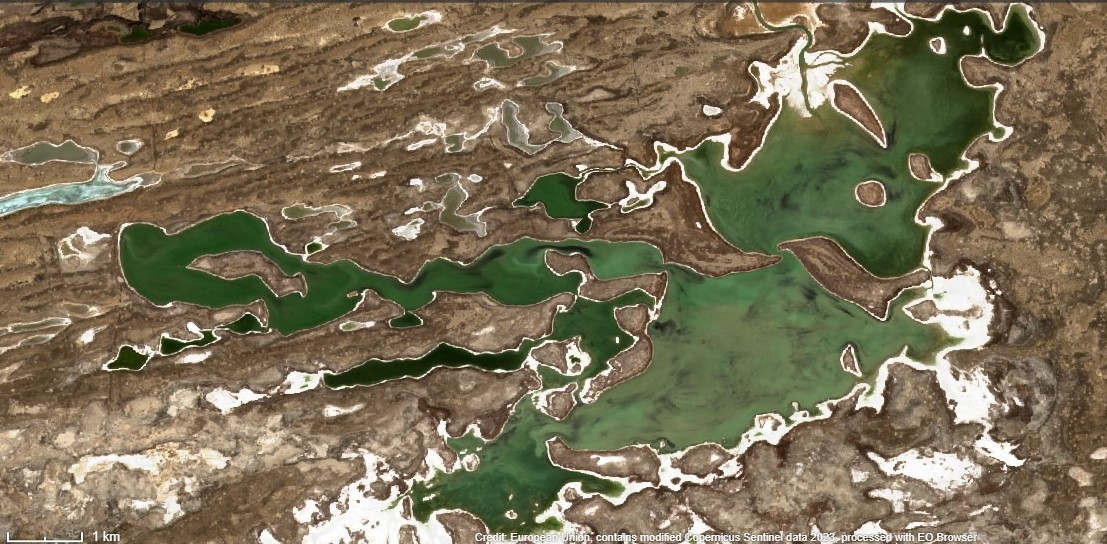
- Sentinel-2 image of the northern sector of the lake in April

- Location within Kazakhstan
- Location: Ashchykol Depression
- Coordinates: 45°08′N 67°16′E
- Type: Endorheic lake
- Primary inflows: Boktykaryn
- Primary outflows: none
- Basin countries: Kazakhstan
- Max. length: ca 20 kilometers (12 mi)
- Max. width: ca 10 kilometers (6.2 mi)
- Surface area: 74 square kilometers (29 sq mi)
- Surface elevation: 110 meters (360 ft)
- Islands: Yes

Ashchykol (Kazakh: Ащыкөл) is a salt lake group in the Kyzylorda and Turkistan regions, Kazakhstan.

Ashchykol is one of the main lakes of the Ashchykol Depression. It is dry most of the year and the plains around the lake are used as a seasonal grazing ground.

== Geography ==
Ashchykol is located in an arid region dominated by the sor type salt flats of the lower Sarysu basin. It has very indented shores, forming a cluster of small lakes after the flood season that follows the melting of the snows, right before it goes completely dry. The Boktykaryn river has its mouth at the northern end, but its waters rarely reach Ashchykol. In years of sufficient rain the Chu river flows from the east into lake Akzhaykyn, located to the ESE. Both lake groups are part of the Important Bird Area "Lakes in the lower reaches of the Chu River".

The shores of Ashchykol are flat and sandy. The border between the Shieli District of Kyzylorda Region and Sozak District of Turkistan Region runs across the northern and eastern ends of the lake. There are no settlements near the lake.

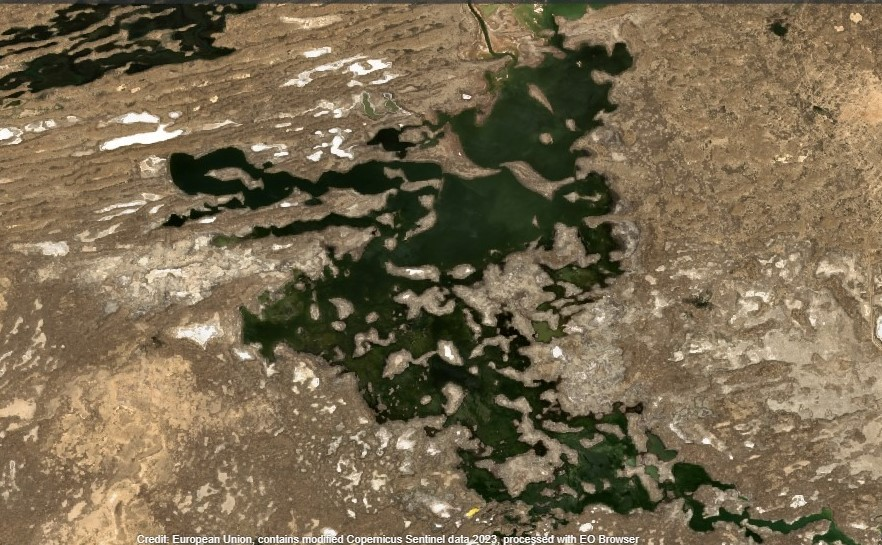
Sentinel-2 image of the wider lake group in May 2017.

== Climate ==
Ashchykol lies in a region of strong winds. Dust storms are common in the area of the lake. The climate is harsh, with temperatures ranging between −35 °C (−31 °F) in the winter and 40 °C (104 °F) in the summer.

== See also ==
- List of lakes of Kazakhstan
- List of fossiliferous stratigraphic units in Kazakhstan
