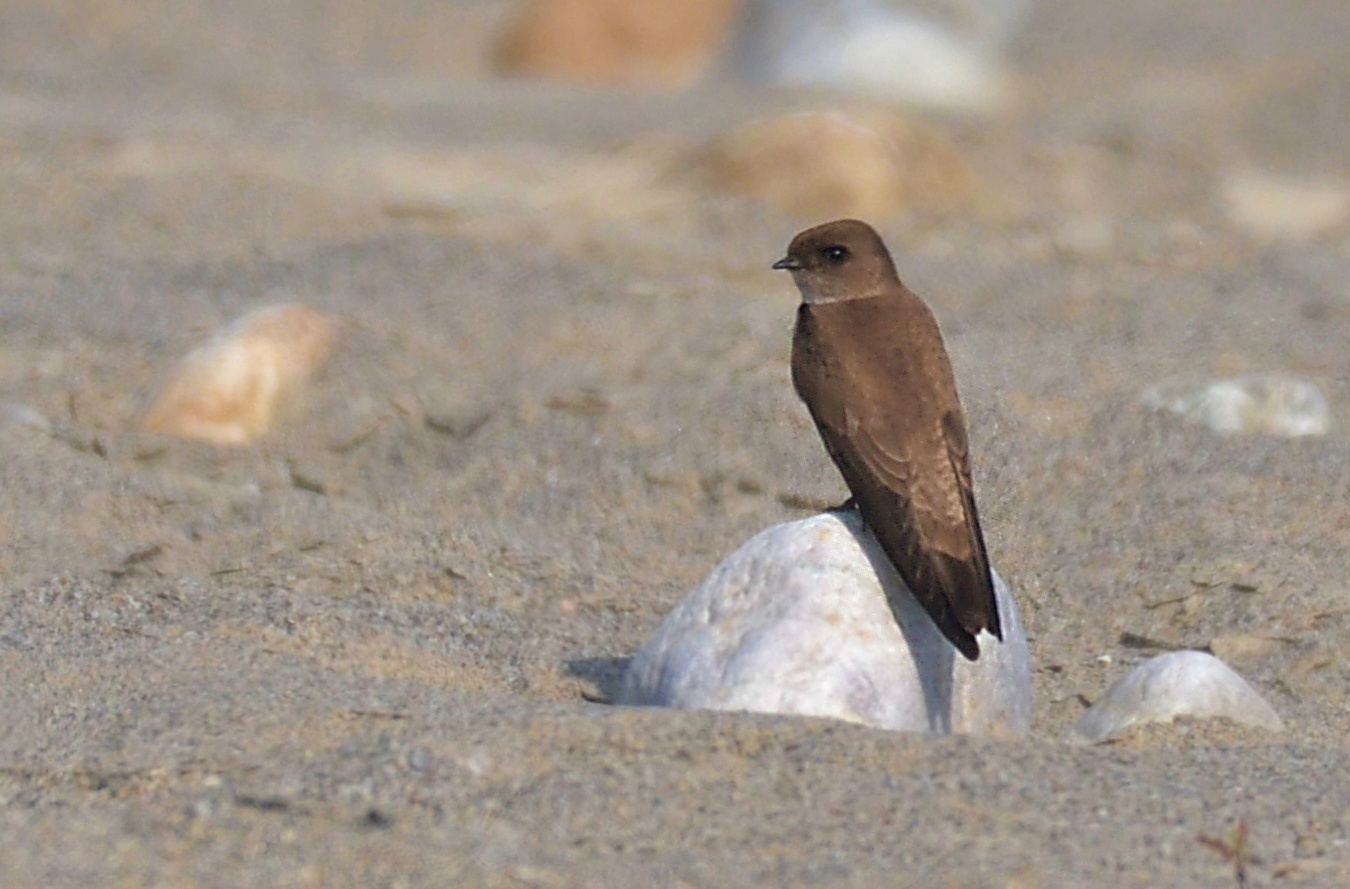

Conservation status
- Least Concern (IUCN 3.1)

Scientific classification
- Kingdom: Animalia
- Phylum: Chordata
- Class: Aves
- Order: Passeriformes
- Family: Hirundinidae
- Genus: Riparia
- Species: R. chinensis

Binomial name
- Riparia chinensis (J.E. Gray, 1830)

= Grey-throated martin =

Species of bird

The grey-throated martin or Asian plain martin (Riparia chinensis) is a small passerine bird in the swallow family.

The grey-throated martin is found in open habitats such as farmland, grassland and savannah, usually near water. It is found from Tajikistan, Afghanistan and Indian subcontinent to southern China, Taiwan, and the northern Philippines. It was formerly considered a subspecies of the plain martin, since renamed the brown-throated martin.
