= Gorkoye (Altai Krai) =

Gorkoye Горькое
- Selo
- Location within Altai Krai Location within Russia
- Coordinates: 51°10′N 80°15′E
- Country: Russia
- Region: Altai Krai
- District: Uglovsky District
- Time zone: UTC+7:00

Gorkoye (Russian: Горькое) is a rural locality (a selo) in Laptevsky Selsoviet, Uglovsky District, Altai Krai, Russia. The population was 15 as of 2013. It was founded in 1900. There is 1 street.

== Geography ==
Gorkoye is located 41 km south of Uglovskoye (the district's administrative centre) by road. Pervye Korosteli is the nearest rural locality.
