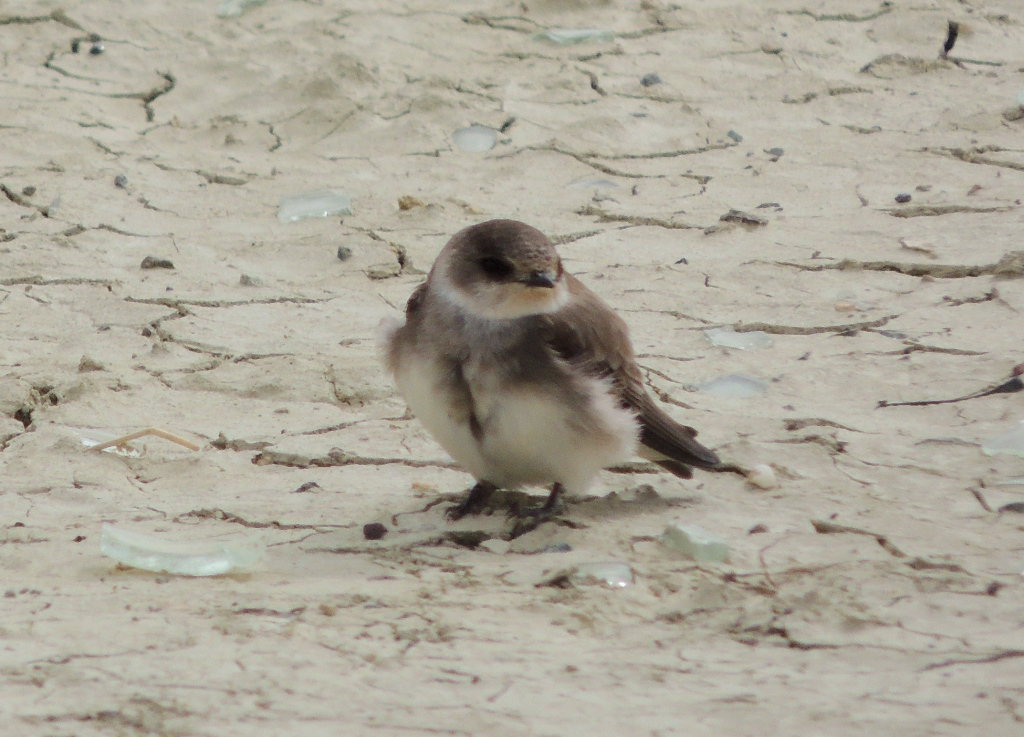
- In Altai, Russia

Conservation status
- Least Concern (IUCN 3.1)

Scientific classification
- Kingdom: Animalia
- Phylum: Chordata
- Class: Aves
- Order: Passeriformes
- Family: Hirundinidae
- Genus: Riparia
- Species: R. diluta

Binomial name
- Riparia diluta (Sharpe & Wyatt, 1893)
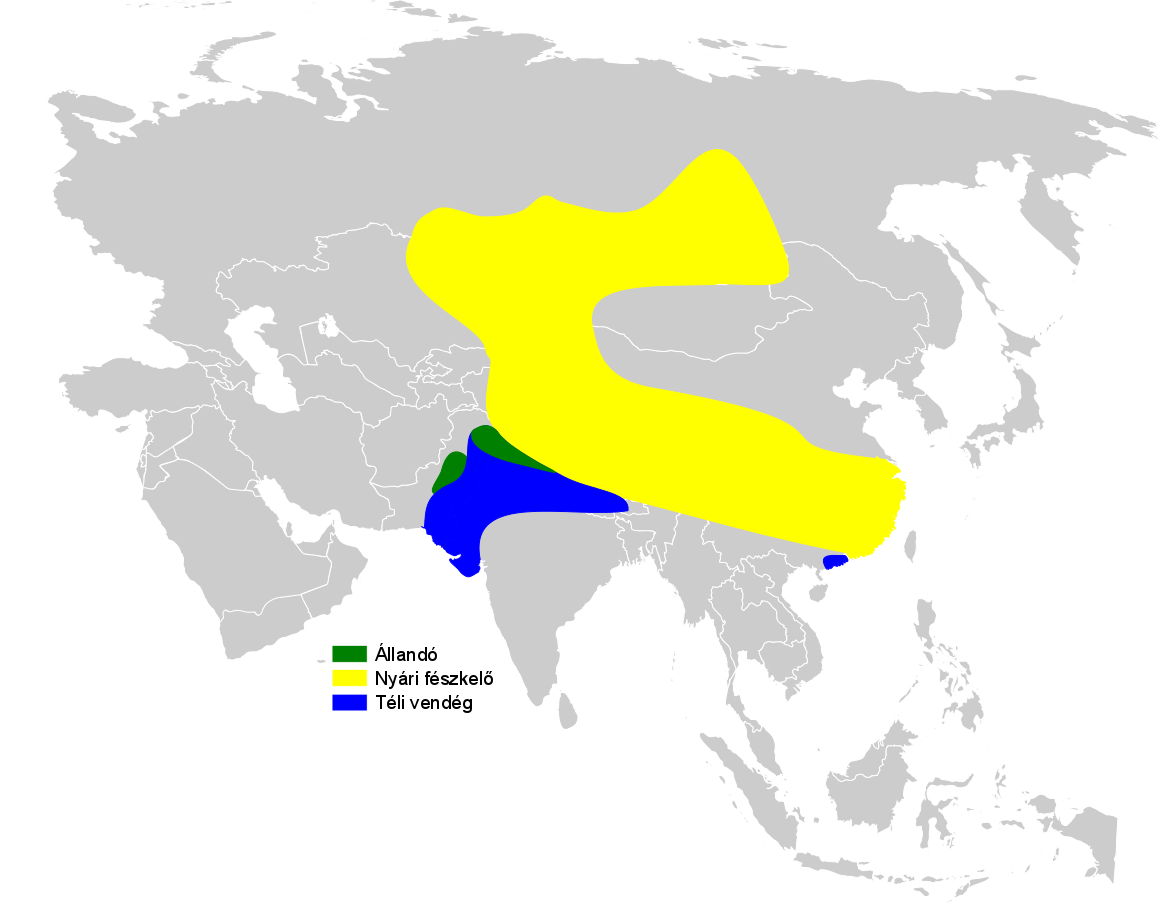

= Pale martin =

Species of bird

The pale martin or pale sand martin (Riparia diluta) is a small passerine bird in the swallow family.

It is found in open habitats such as farmland, grassland and savannah, usually near water. It is found from Central Asia to southeastern China. The species was formerly considered a subspecies of the sand martin.
