= Kumkent =

Kumkent Құмкент
- Village
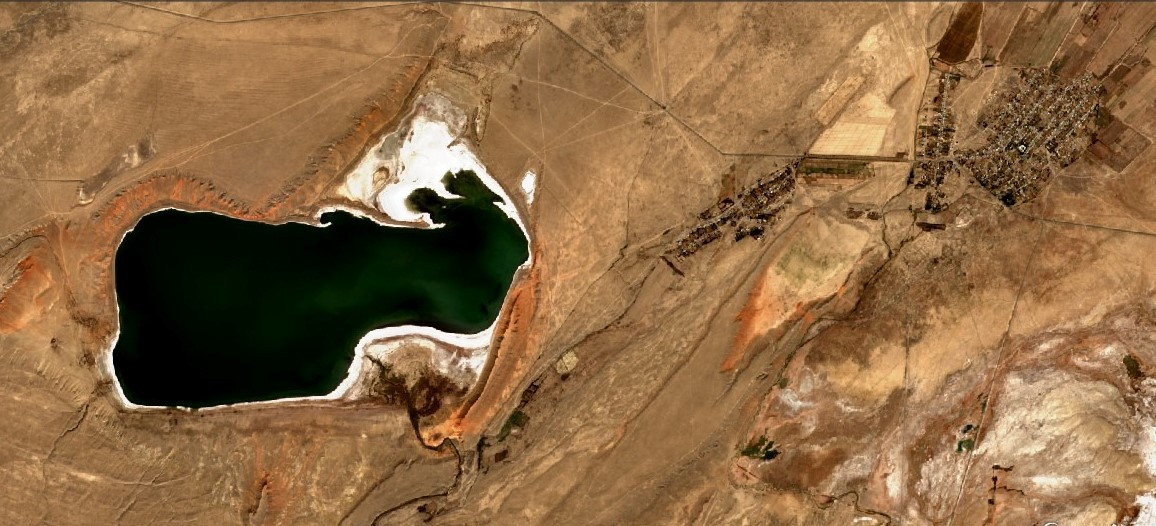
- Sentinel-2 image of Kyzylkol lake and Kumkent village

- Location in Kazakhstan
- Coordinates: 43°46′08″N 69°36′50″E
- Country: Kazakhstan
- Region: Turkestan Region
- District: Sozak District
- Rural District: Kumkent Rural District

Population (2009)
  - Total: 2,063
- Time zone: UTC+6 (East Kazakhstan Time)

Kumkent (Kazakh: Құмкент) is a village in Sozak District in Turkestan Region of Kazakhstan. It is the head of the Kumkent rural district (KATO code - 515643100). Population: 2,063 (2009 census results); 2,038 (1999 census results).

The archaeological remains of the ancient Kumkent fortification are located to the southwest.

== Geography ==
Kyzylkol lake lies close to the village and the Akzhar lakes lie to the northeast. The district center is the settlement of Sholakkorgan, located 39 kilometers (24 mi) to the west of Kumkent.
