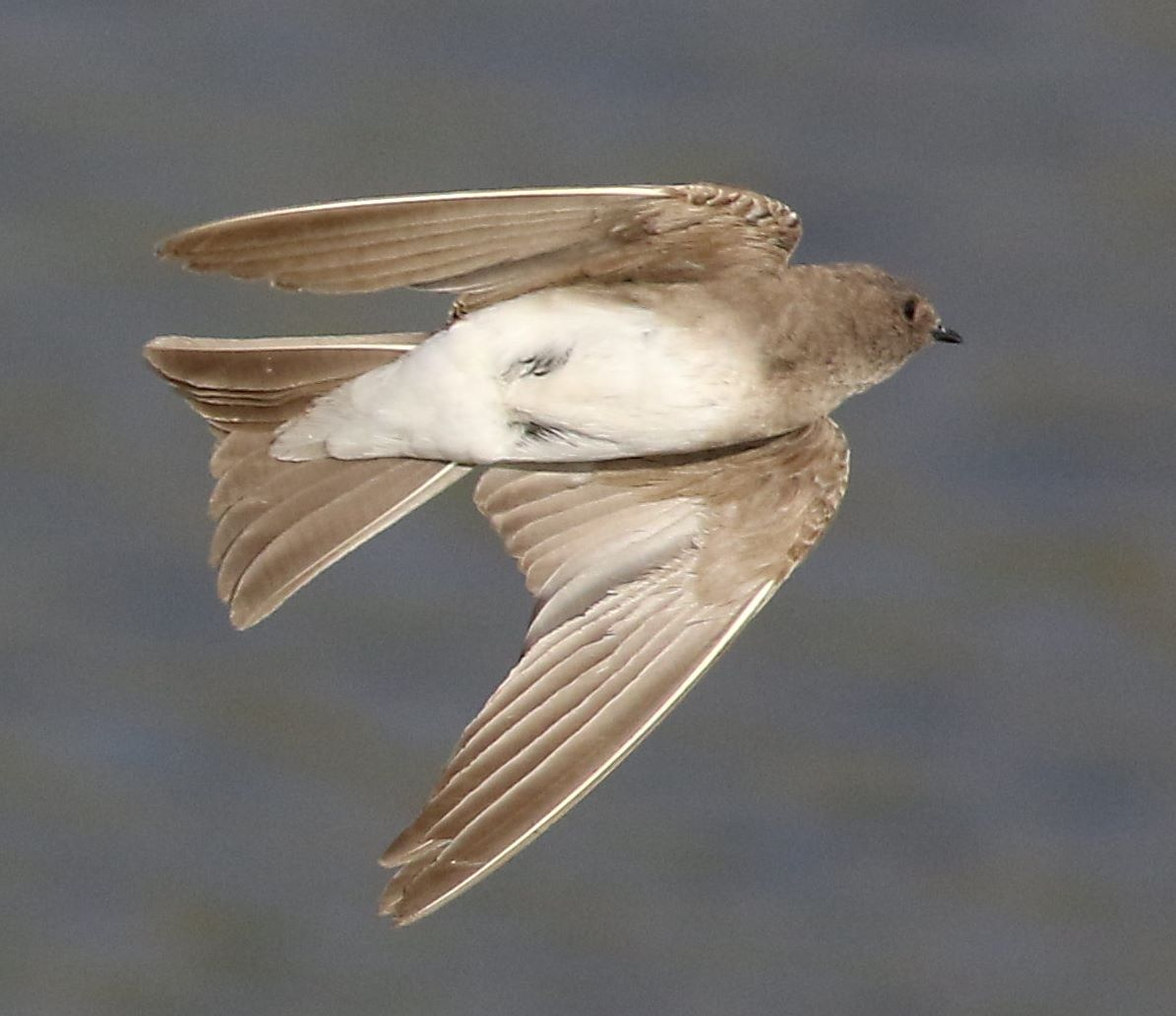

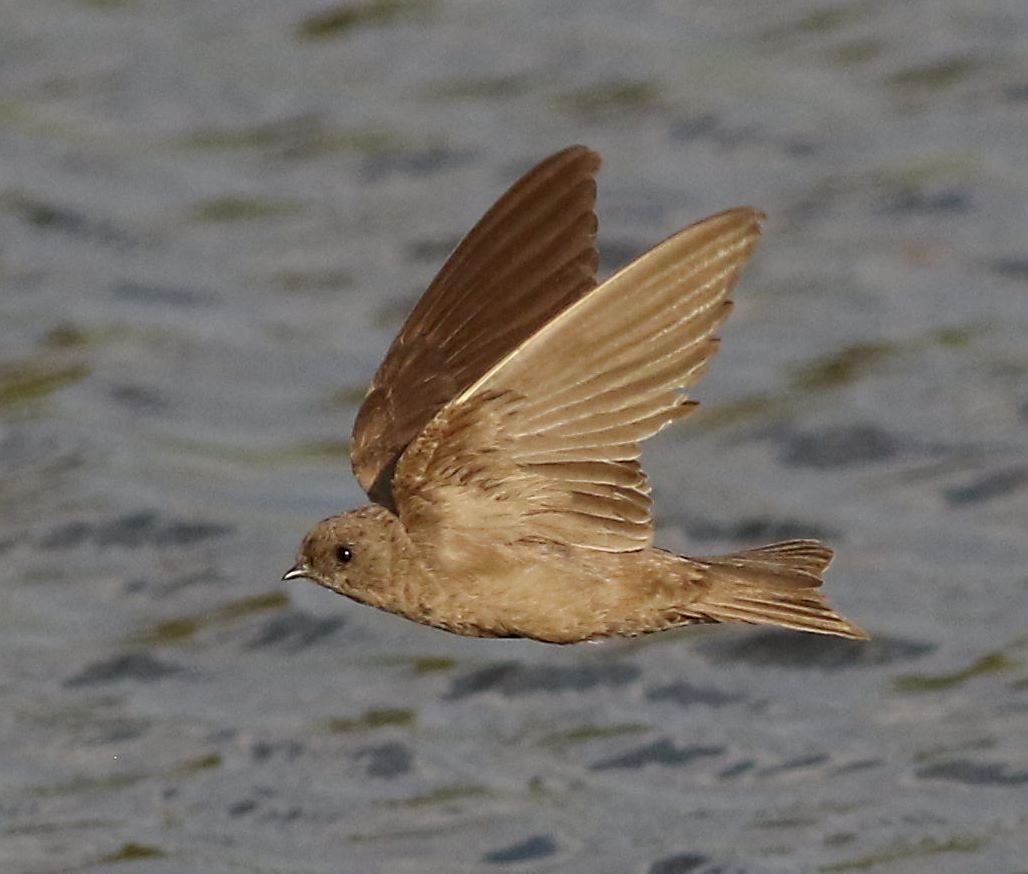
- Two plumage morphs of Riparia paludicola

Conservation status
- Least Concern (IUCN 3.1)

Scientific classification
- Kingdom: Animalia
- Phylum: Chordata
- Class: Aves
- Order: Passeriformes
- Family: Hirundinidae
- Genus: Riparia
- Species: R. paludicola

Binomial name
- Riparia paludicola (Vieillot, 1817)
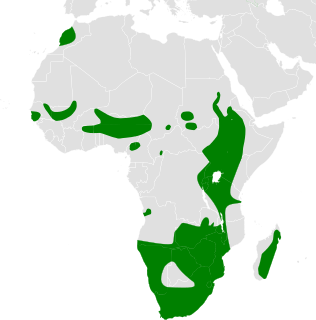
- native range

= Brown-throated martin =

Species of bird

The brown-throated martin, brown-throated sand martin or plain martin (Riparia paludicola) is a small passerine bird in the swallow family, Hirundinidae, that is widely distributed across Africa. It was formerly regarded as conspecific with the grey-throated martin (Riparia chinensis) and the Madagascar martin (Riparia cowani).

== Taxonomy ==
The brown-throated martin was formally described in 1817 by the French ornithologist Louis Pierre Vieillot. He placed it in the genus Hirundo and coined the binomial name Hirundo paludicola. The specific epithet paludicola is Latin meaning "marsh-dweller" (from palus, paludis meaning "swamp" and -cola meaning "dweller". Vieillot based his account on "L'hirondelle à front roux" from South Africa that had been described and illustrated in 1806 by François Levaillant. The brown-throated martin is now one of six martins placed in the genus Riparia that was introduced in 1817 by the German naturalist Johann Reinhold Forster. It was formerly considered to be conspecific with the grey-throated martin (Riparia chinensis) and the Madagascar martin (Riparia cowani).

Six subspecies are recognised. They differ in size and plumage tones of the upperparts or underparts.

- R. p. mauritanica (Meade-Waldo, 1901) – west Morocco
- R. p. minor (Cabanis, 1851) – Senegal and Gambia to north Ethiopia
- R. p. schoensis Reichenow, 1920 – central Ethiopia
- R. p. newtoni Bannerman, 1937 – northeast Nigeria and west Cameroon
- R. p. ducis Reichenow, 1908 – east DRCongo, Uganda, Kenya and north, central Tanzania
- R. p. paludicola (Vieillot, 1817) – Angola to south Tanzania and south to South Africa

== Description ==
The 12 cm long brown-throated martin is brown above and white or pale brown below. It lacks the narrow brown band on the breast shown by the sand martin; the bill is black and the legs are brown. Sexes are similar, but the young have pale tips to the feathers on the rump and wings.

The twittering song of the brown-throated martin is continuous when the birds are on the wing, and becomes a conversational undertone after they have settled in the roost. There is also a harsh alarm call.

== Distribution and habitat ==
It has a wide range in Africa. It is a partially migratory species, with some populations making seasonal movements. It is usually associated closely with water as its specific epithet paludicola suggests.

== Behaviour ==
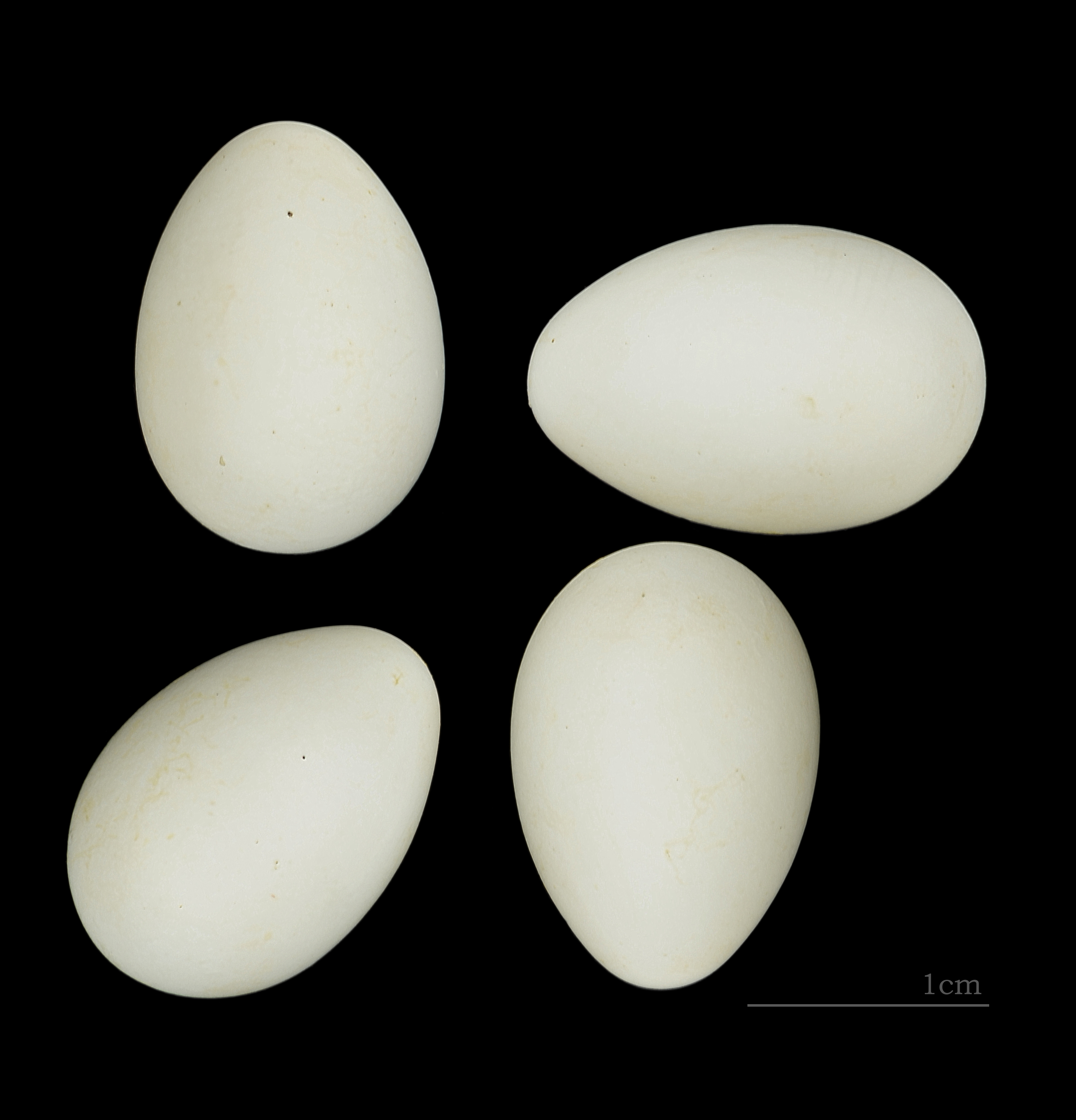
A clutch of Riparia paludicola

Its brown back, small size and quicker, jerkier flight separate the brown-throated martin at once from most other members of the swallow family. It is most similar to the sand martin, Riparia riparia, which is its northern counterpart.

=== Breeding ===
The brown-throated martin is colonial in its nesting habits, with many pairs breeding close together, according to available space. The nests are at the end of tunnels of 30 to 60 cm in length, bored in sandbanks. The actual nest is a litter of straw and feathers in a chamber at the end of the burrow. Two to four white eggs are the normal clutch, and are incubated by both parents.

=== Food and feeding ===
The food of this species consists of small insects, mostly gnats and other flies whose early stages are aquatic.
