= Ashchykol Depression =

Plain in Kazakhstan

Ashchykol Depression Ащыкөл ойпаты (Kazakh) Ащыкольская впадина (Russian)
- Depression
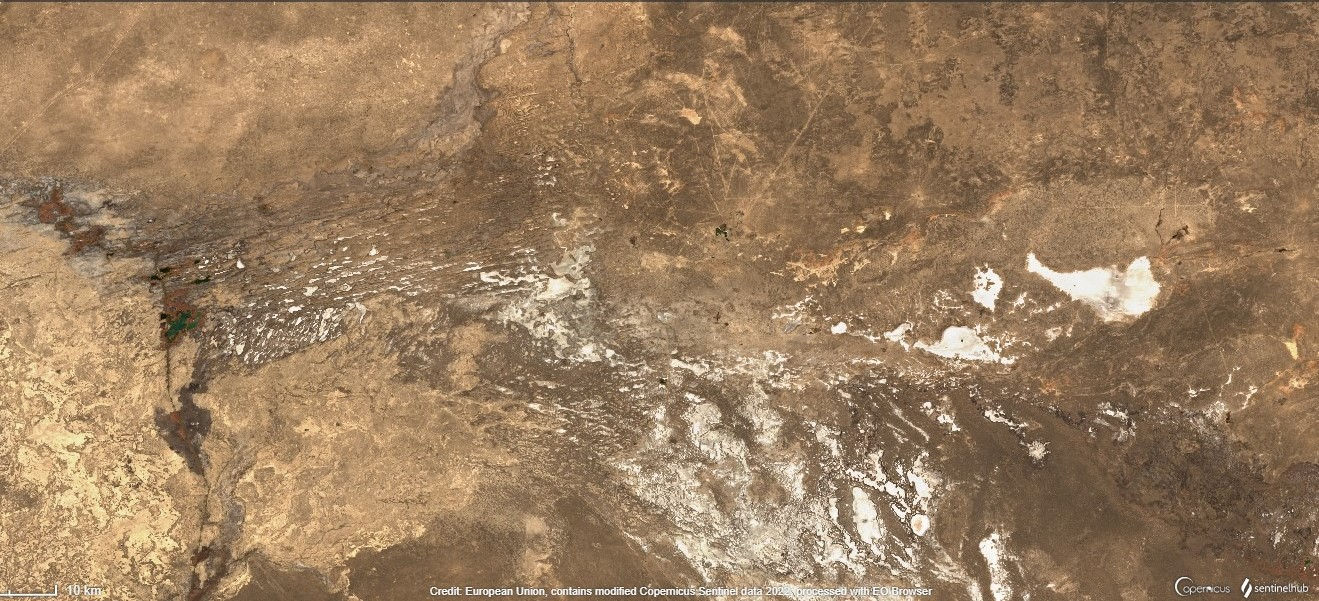
- Ashchykol Depression Sentinel-2 image

- Location within Kazakhstan
- Coordinates: 45°10′N 67°25′E
- Location: Kazakhstan

Dimensions
  - Length: 90 km (56 mi)
  - Width: 25 km (16 mi) to 300 km (190 mi)
- Elevation: 120 m (390 ft) to 200 m (660 ft)

The Ashchykol Depression (Kazakh: Aştşyköl oipaty), is a depression in the Turkistan and Kyzylorda regions, Kazakhstan.

The village of Taykonyr, Suzak District, Turkistan Region is located in the depression. The Ashchykol zone includes a 147,950 hectares (365,600 acres) Important Bird Area.

== Geography ==
The Ashchykol Depression lies between the lowest reaches of the Sarysu in the west and the mouth of the Chu river in the east. It extends roughly from east to west for a length of roughly 100 km (62 mi) to the southwest of the Betpak-Dala desert, west of the Moiynkum Desert and north of the northwestern end of the Karatau Range.

It is a largely flat endorheic basin filled with mixed sand and clay deposits, as well as sandy alluvial sediments. There are numerous intermittent salt lakes and sors. The main lakes are Akzhaikyn and Ashchykol. In wet years the Chu river may reach lake Akzhaikyn at the eastern end and the Boktykaryn the Ashchykol lake. At the western end the Sarysu river usually ends in the Telikol lake. The latter is located between the western limit of the Ashchykol Depression and the Daryaly takir plain further to the west.

== Flora ==
Reeds and sedges may grow in marshy areas and lake shores. Wormwood, winterfat, Aeluropus and saltwort grow sparsely in the land areas in between.

== See also ==
- Geology of Kazakhstan
