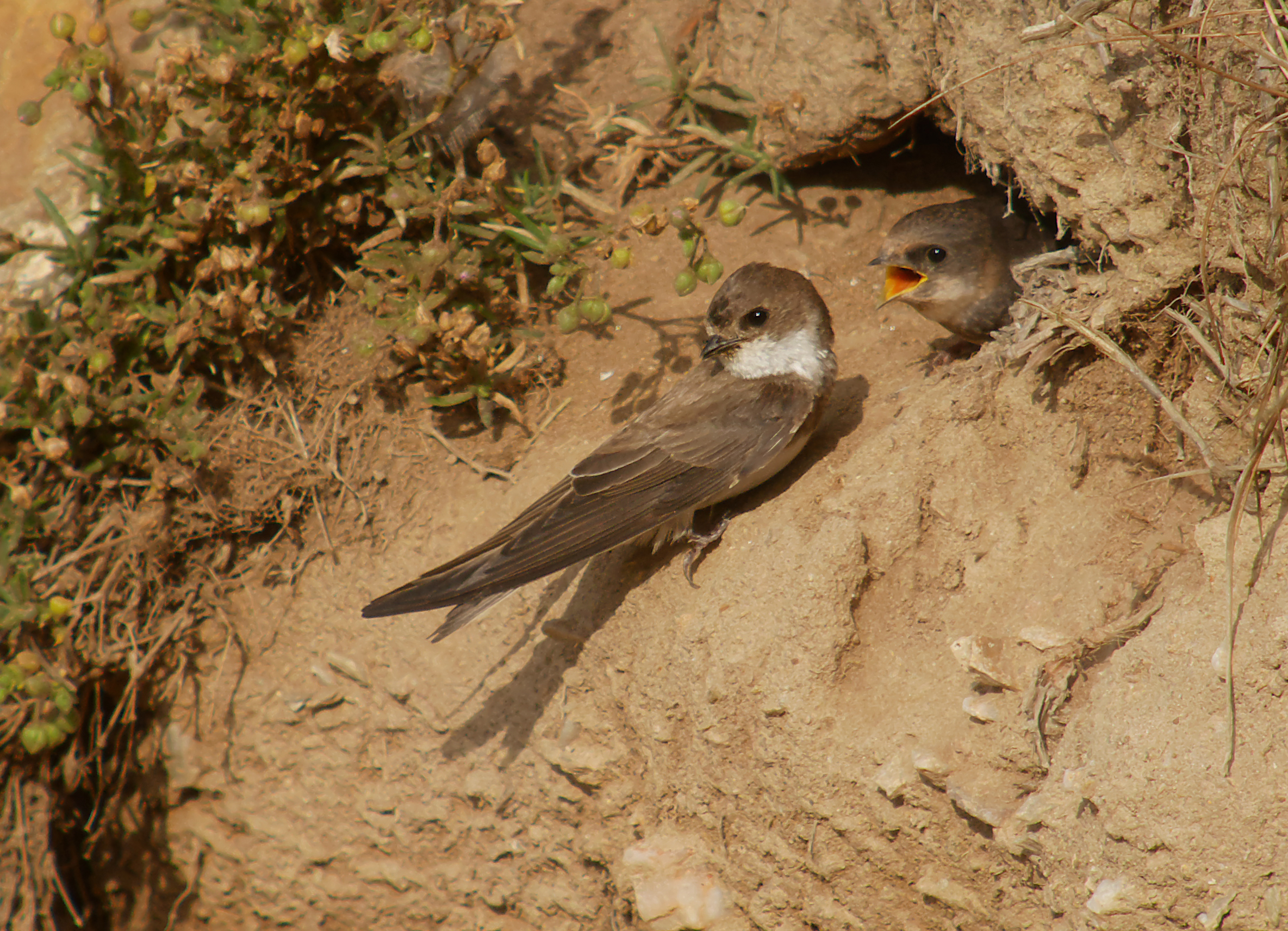
- Sand martin at its nest hole, Brittany, France

Conservation status
- Least Concern (IUCN 3.1)

Scientific classification
- Kingdom: Animalia
- Phylum: Chordata
- Class: Aves
- Order: Passeriformes
- Family: Hirundinidae
- Genus: Riparia
- Species: R. riparia

Binomial name
- Riparia riparia (Linnaeus, 1758)

Subspecies
- Four; see text
- Range of R. riparia Breeding Migration Nonbreeding

Synonyms
- Hirundo riparia Linnaeus, 1758; Cotile riparia (Linnaeus)

= Sand martin =

Sand martin / Bank swallow

Species of bird

The sand martin (Riparia riparia), also known as the collared sand martin or common sand martin, and in the Americas as the bank swallow, is a migratory passerine bird in the swallow family Hirundinidae. It has a wide range in summer, embracing practically the whole Holarctic area, from Europe, across Asia to the Pacific Ocean, and throughout North America. It winters in eastern and southern Africa, southern Asia, and South America.

== Taxonomy ==
This species was first described by Carl Linnaeus in his 1758 10th edition of Systema Naturae, and originally named Hirundo riparia; the description consisted of the simple "H[irundo] cinerea, gula abdomineque albis" ("an ash-grey swallow, with white throat and belly") and the type locality was simply given as "Europa", subsequently refined to refer to Linnaeus's homeland of Sweden. The specific name means "of the riverbank"; it is derived from the Latin ripa "riverbank".

There are three or four weakly defined subspecies:

- R. r. riparia (syn. R. r. dolgushini, R. r. innominata, R. r. kolymensis). Breeds Europe, western Asia, North America; winters Africa, South America.
- R. r. taczanowskii. Doubtfully distinct from R. r. ijimae and often included in it. Breeds eastern mainland Asia; winters southern Asia.
- R. r. ijimae. Breeds Sakhalin, Kuril Islands, and Japan; winters southeast Asia.
- R. r. shelleyi (syn. R. r. eilata). Slightly smaller and paler than R. r. riparia. Breeds Egypt, on passage in southern Israel; wintering area not reported, presumably Africa.

The pale martin (Riparia diluta) of northern India and southeastern China was formerly sometimes included as another subspecies of sand martin. It is smaller, and has paler grey-brown upperparts and a less distinct breast band. It winters in Pakistan, southern India and Sri Lanka.

== Description ==
The sand martin is brown above, white below with a narrow brown band on the breast; the bill is black, the legs brown. The young have rufous tips to the coverts and margins to the secondaries.

Its brown back and breast band, white throat, small size and quick jerky flight separate it from similar swallows, such as the common house martin (Delichon urbicum), the American cliff swallow (Petrochelidon pyrrhonota) and the tree swallow (Tachycineta bicolor). The other species of Riparia are more similar; the sand martin generally only occurs them in the wintering range, though there is breeding range overlap with pale martin in central Asia, with both species sharing mixed colonies without interbreeding. The banded martin (Neophedina cincta) of sub-Saharan Africa is very similar in plumage pattern, but is markedly larger, nearly double the weight.

Measurements:

- Length: 12–13 cm (4.7–5.1 in)
- Wingspan: 26.5–29 cm (10.4–11.4 in)
- Weight: 11–16 g (0.39–0.56 oz) (to 19.5 g (0.69 oz) before migration)

The song is a continuous gravelly twittering when the birds are on the wing and becomes a conversational undertone after they have settled in the roost. The harsh alarm is heard when a passing falcon, crow or other suspected predator requires combined action to drive it away.

== Ecology ==
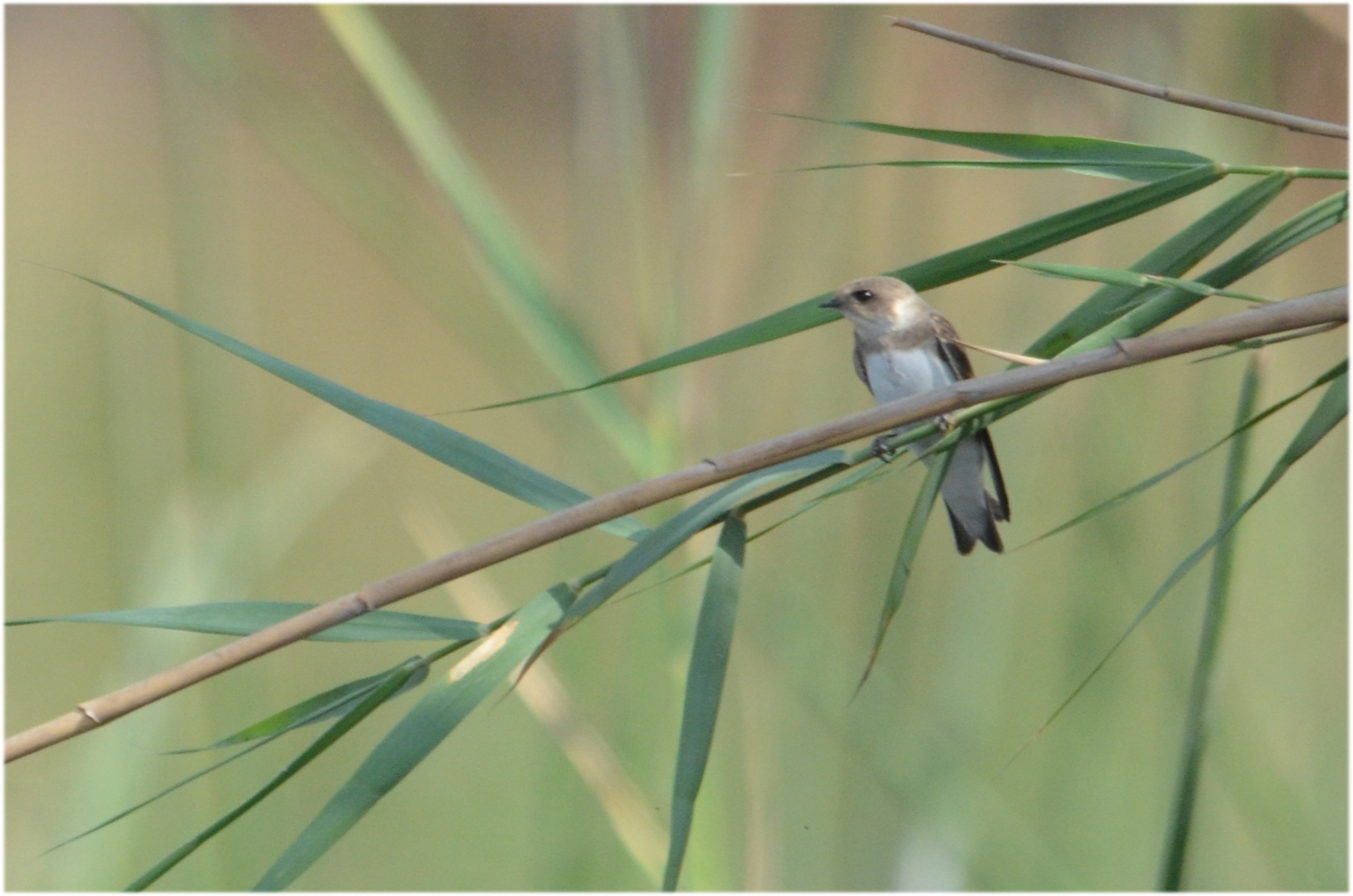
R. r. shelleyi at Abbassia, Egypt

Linnaeus already remarked on this species' breeding habits: Habitat in Europae collibus arenosis abruptis, foramine serpentino ("it lives in Europe, in winding holes in sheer sandy hills"). It has been observed that sand martins favour loess as a particular type of ground to nest in. Sand martins are generally found near larger bodies of water, such as rivers, lakes or even the ocean, throughout the year.

In Britain, the sand martin is the first of its family to appear on its breeding grounds, arriving from the middle of March, a week or two in advance of the barn swallow. In northern Ohio, they arrive in numbers by mid-April, about 10 days earlier than they did 100 years ago. At first, they flit over the larger bodies of water alone, in search of early flies. Later parties accompany other swallow species, but for a time, varying according to weather, the birds remain at these large waters and do not visit their nesting haunts. The sand martin departs early, at any rate from its more northerly haunts. In August, the gatherings at the nightly roost increase enormously, though the advent and departure of passage birds causes great irregularity in numbers. They are essentially gone from their breeding range by the end of September.

Their food consists of small insects, mostly gnats and other flies whose early stages are aquatic.

The sand martin is sociable in its nesting habits; from a dozen to many hundred pairs will nest close together, according to available space. The nests are at the end of tunnels ranging from a few inches to three or four feet in length, bored in sand or gravel. The actual nest is a litter of straw and feathers in a chamber at the end of the burrow; it soon becomes a hotbed of parasites. Four or five white eggs are laid about mid-late May, and a second brood is usual in all but the most northernly breeding sites.

Globally, it is not rare and classified as a species of least concern (but noted to be decreasing) by the IUCN. It does have some national and local protections, as certain populations have declined or face threats from habitat loss and fragmentation. In Canada, it is listed as Threatened under Schedule 1 of the federal Species at Risk Act (SARA) due to the loss of 98% of its Canadian population over the past 40 years. They are considered threatened in California, where populations exist in the Sacramento Valley and at two coastal sites, Año Nuevo State Park and Fort Funston.

== Gallery ==
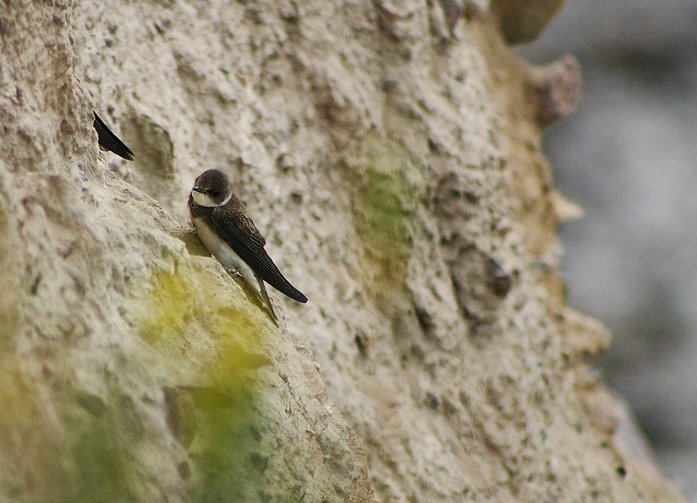
Showing dark breast band

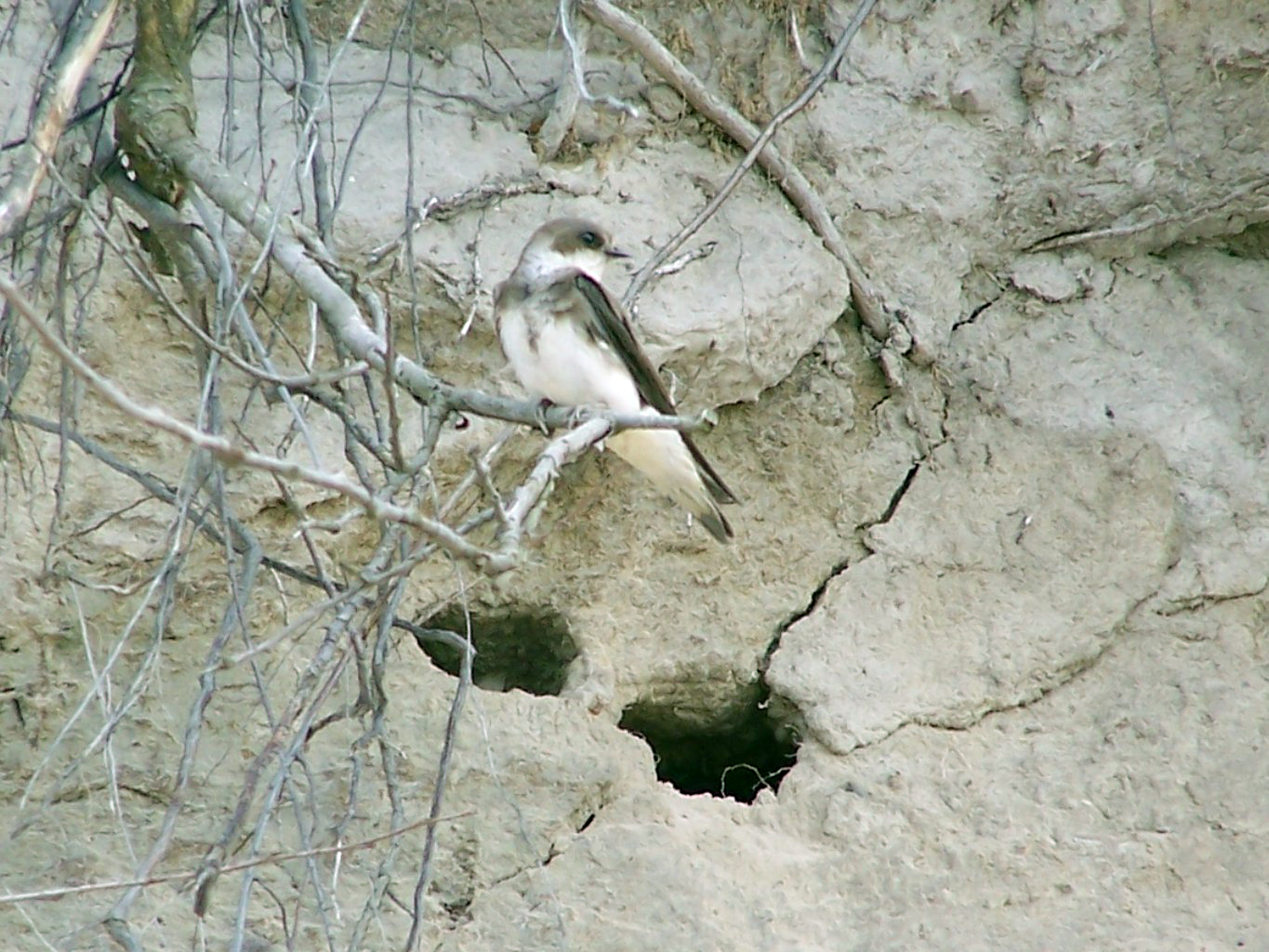
Adult at nest site, Dziwnówek, Poland

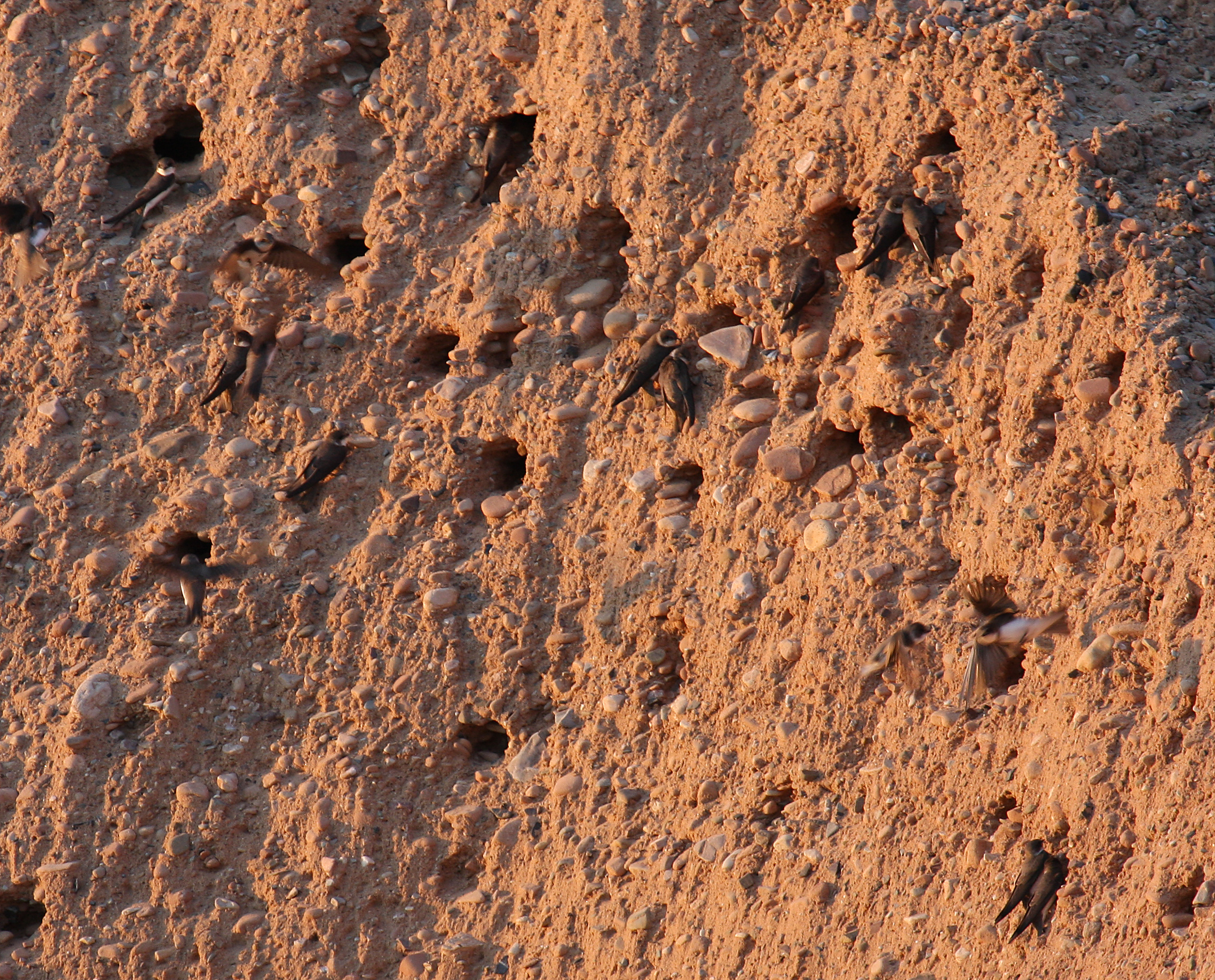
Active breeding colony

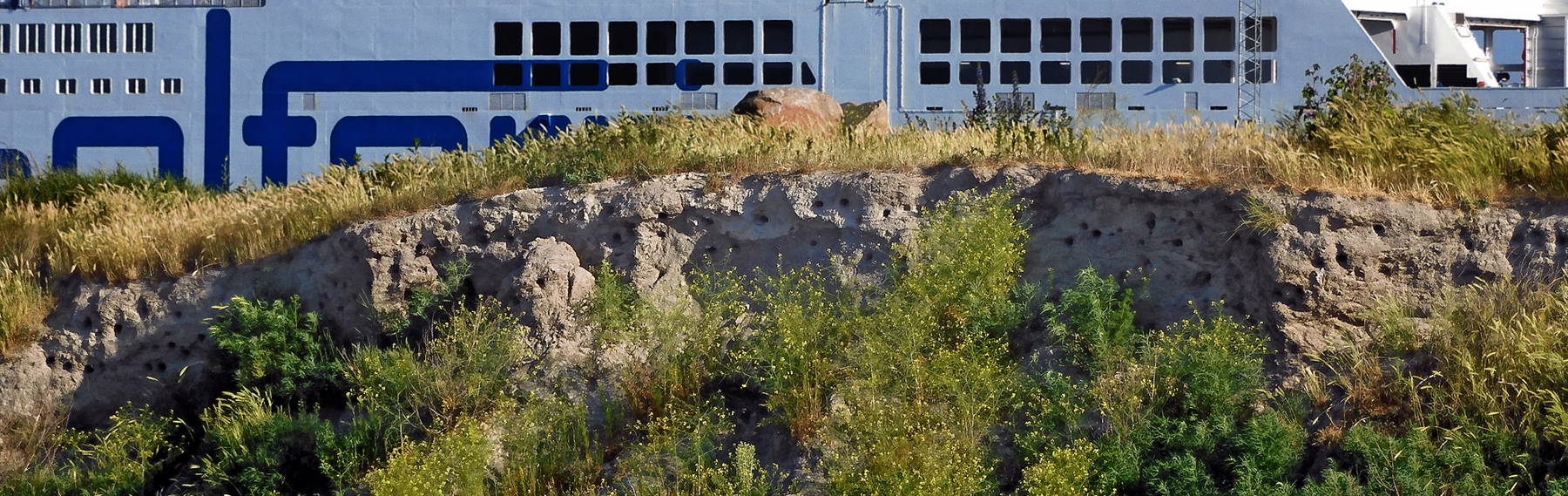
Abandoned breeding colony

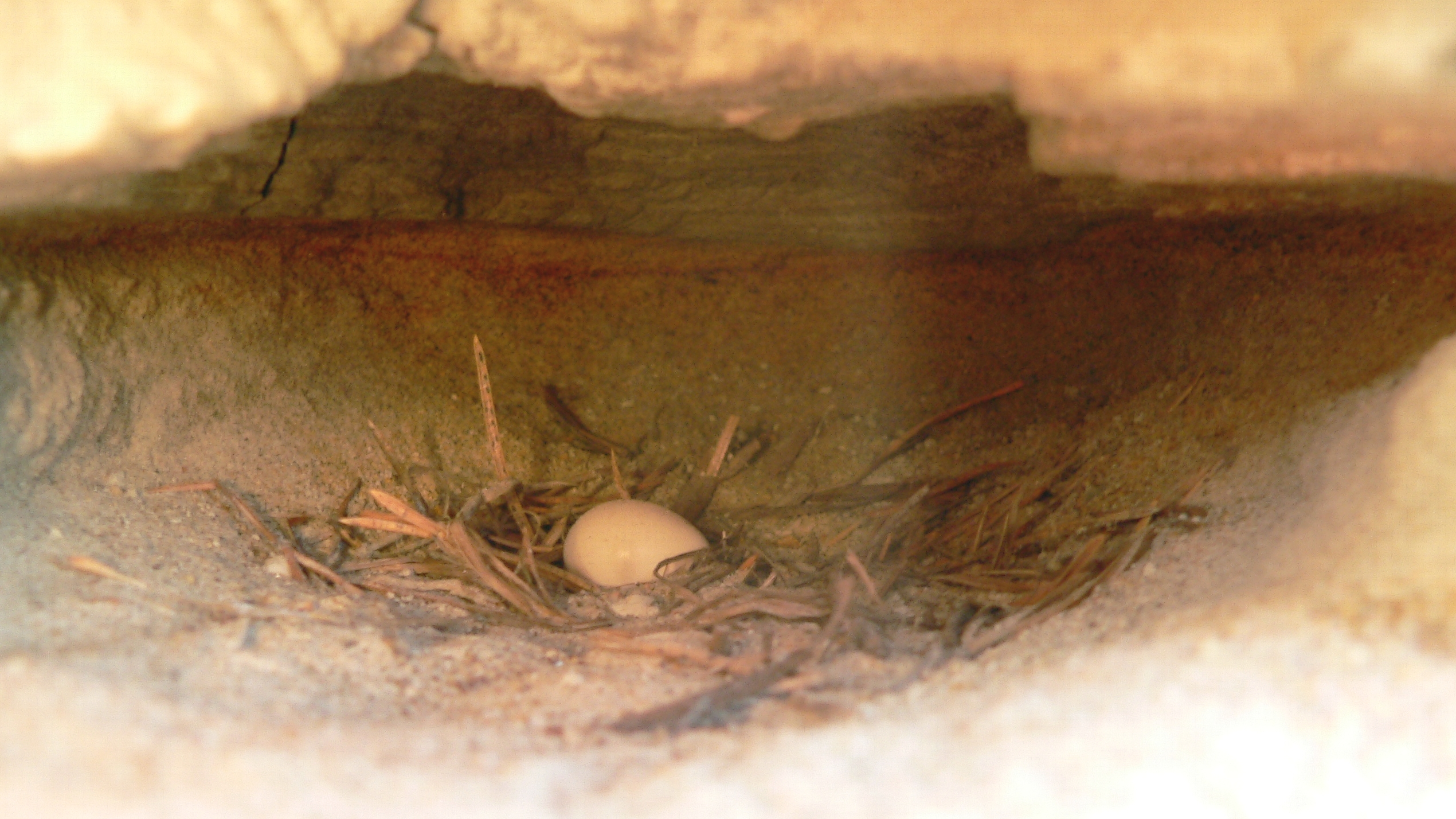
Nest with egg

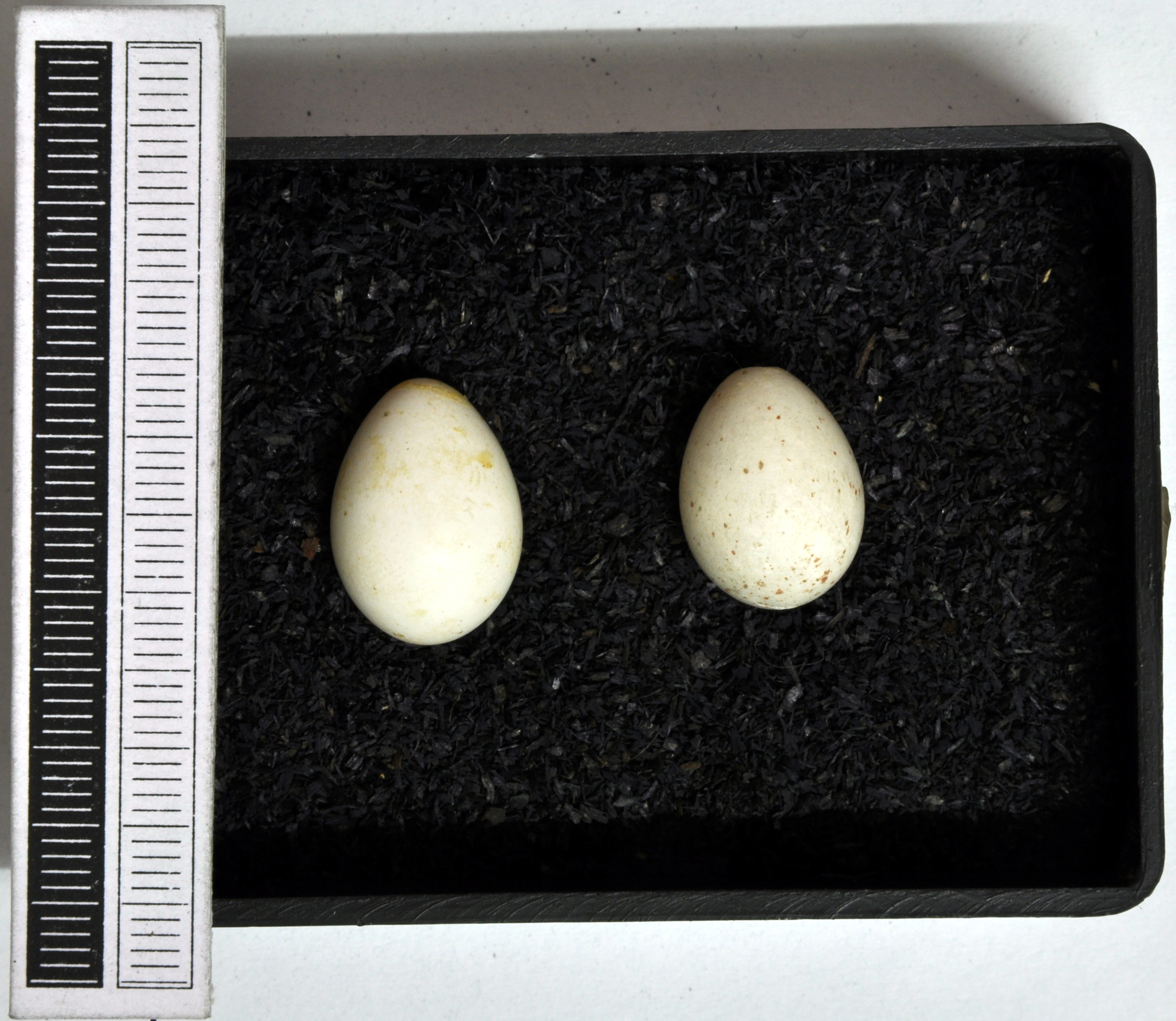
Eggs, Collection Museum Wiesbaden, Germany
