= Sholakkorgan =

Sholakkorgan Шолаққорған
- Village
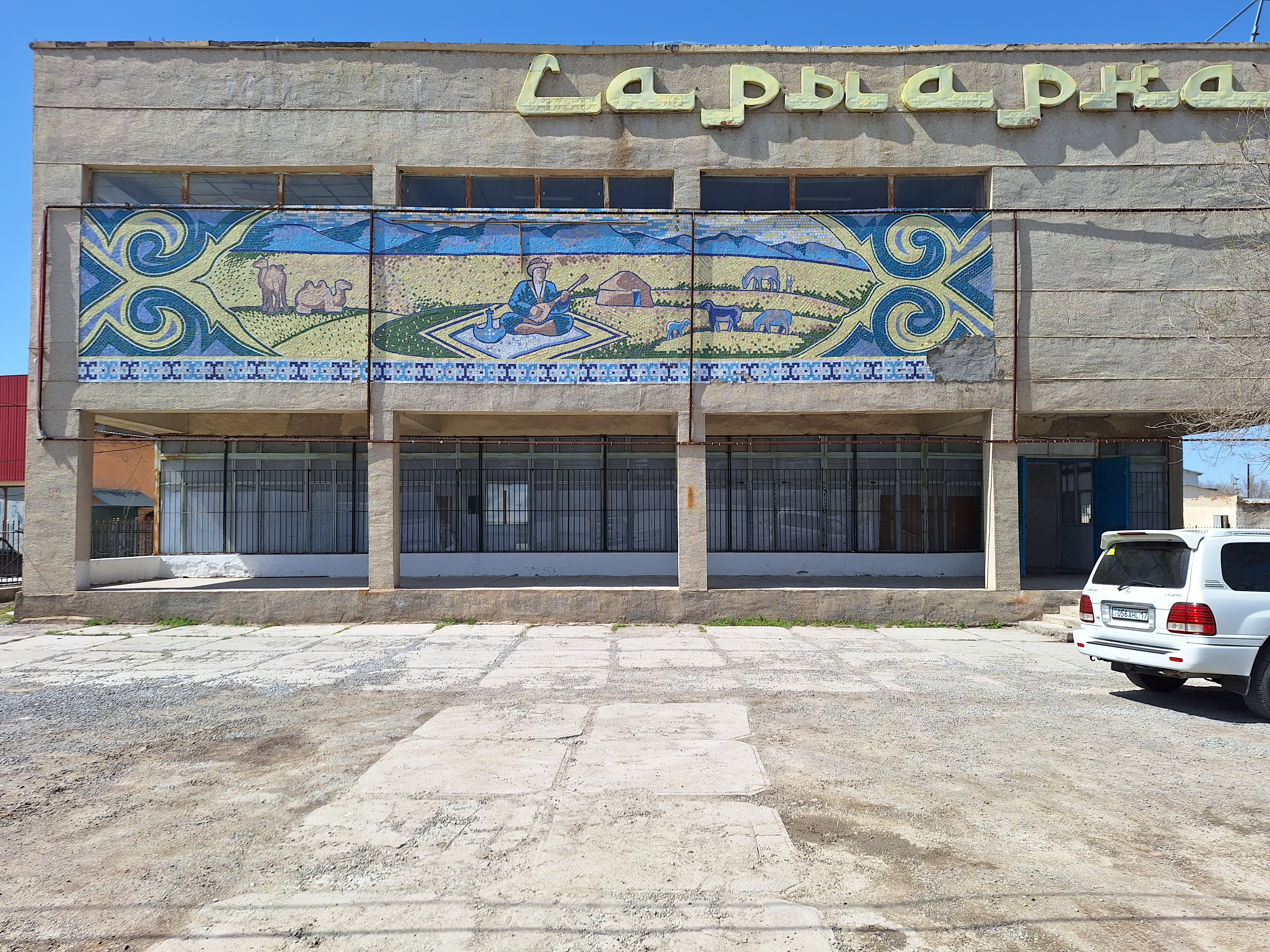

- Location in Kazakhstan
- Coordinates: 43°45′54″N 69°10′33″E
- Country: Kazakhstan
- Region: Turkestan Region
- District: Sozak District
- Rural District: Volodar Rural District

Population (2019)
  - Total: 12,176
- Time zone: UTC+6 (East Kazakhstan Time)
- Post code: 161000

Sholakkorgan (Kazakh: Шолаққорған) is a settlement and the administrative center of Sozak District in Turkistan Region of Kazakhstan. It is the head of the Sholakkorgan rural district (KATO code - 515630100). Population: 7,934 (2009 census results); 8,727 (1999 census results).

== Geography ==
Sholakkorgan lies north of the Karatau Mountains, 110 kilometers (68 mi) to the northeast of Turkistan city. Kumkent village is located 39 kilometers (24 mi) to the east.

=== Climate ===
Sholakkorgan has a semi-arid climate (Köppen: BSk) with cold winters and hot summers.

Climate data for Sholakkorgan (1991–2020)
Month	Jan	Feb	Mar	Apr	May	Jun	Jul	Aug	Sep	Oct	Nov	Dec	Year
Mean daily maximum °C (°F)	−1.0 (30.2)	1.6 (34.9)	9.9 (49.8)	18.8 (65.8)	25.9 (78.6)	31.7 (89.1)	33.6 (92.5)	32.2 (90.0)	25.5 (77.9)	17.3 (63.1)	7.2 (45.0)	0.7 (33.3)	16.9 (62.4)
Daily mean °C (°F)	−5.5 (22.1)	−3.3 (26.1)	4.1 (39.4)	12.2 (54.0)	18.9 (66.0)	24.9 (76.8)	26.8 (80.2)	24.9 (76.8)	18.1 (64.6)	10.1 (50.2)	1.8 (35.2)	−4.1 (24.6)	10.7 (51.3)
Mean daily minimum °C (°F)	−9.3 (15.3)	−7.5 (18.5)	−0.6 (30.9)	6.2 (43.2)	11.8 (53.2)	17.2 (63.0)	19.0 (66.2)	17.1 (62.8)	10.8 (51.4)	3.9 (39.0)	−2.7 (27.1)	−8.1 (17.4)	4.8 (40.6)
Average precipitation mm (inches)	13.5 (0.53)	16.0 (0.63)	24.6 (0.97)	29.9 (1.18)	25.0 (0.98)	15.0 (0.59)	8.0 (0.31)	2.4 (0.09)	3.1 (0.12)	12.6 (0.50)	17.6 (0.69)	15.6 (0.61)	183.3 (7.22)
Average precipitation days (≥ 1.0 mm)	3.6	4.2	4.5	4.7	3.8	2.5	1.8	0.7	0.8	2.5	3.9	3.6	36.6
Source: NOAA
