= Sozak District =

Coordinates: 45°07′12″N 68°38′24″E

Sozak Созақ
- District
- Созақ ауданы
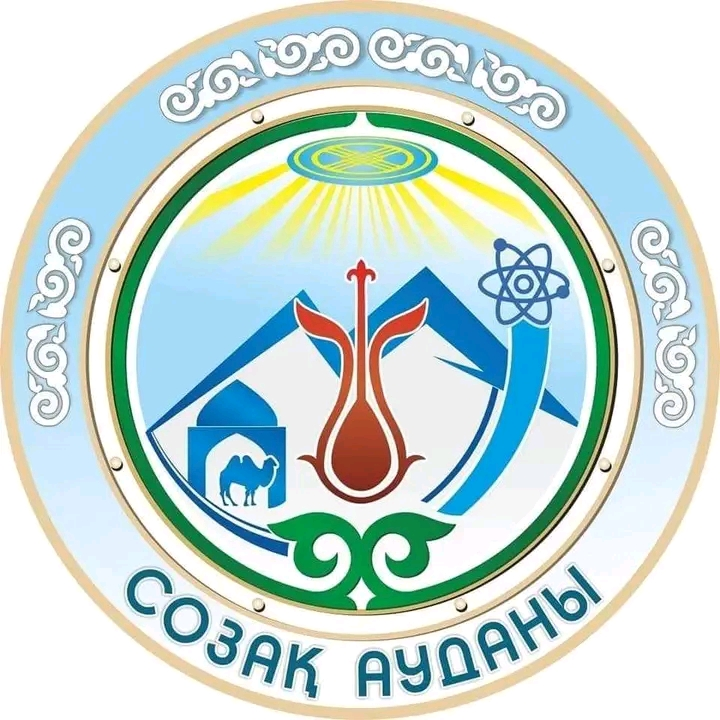
- Coat of arms

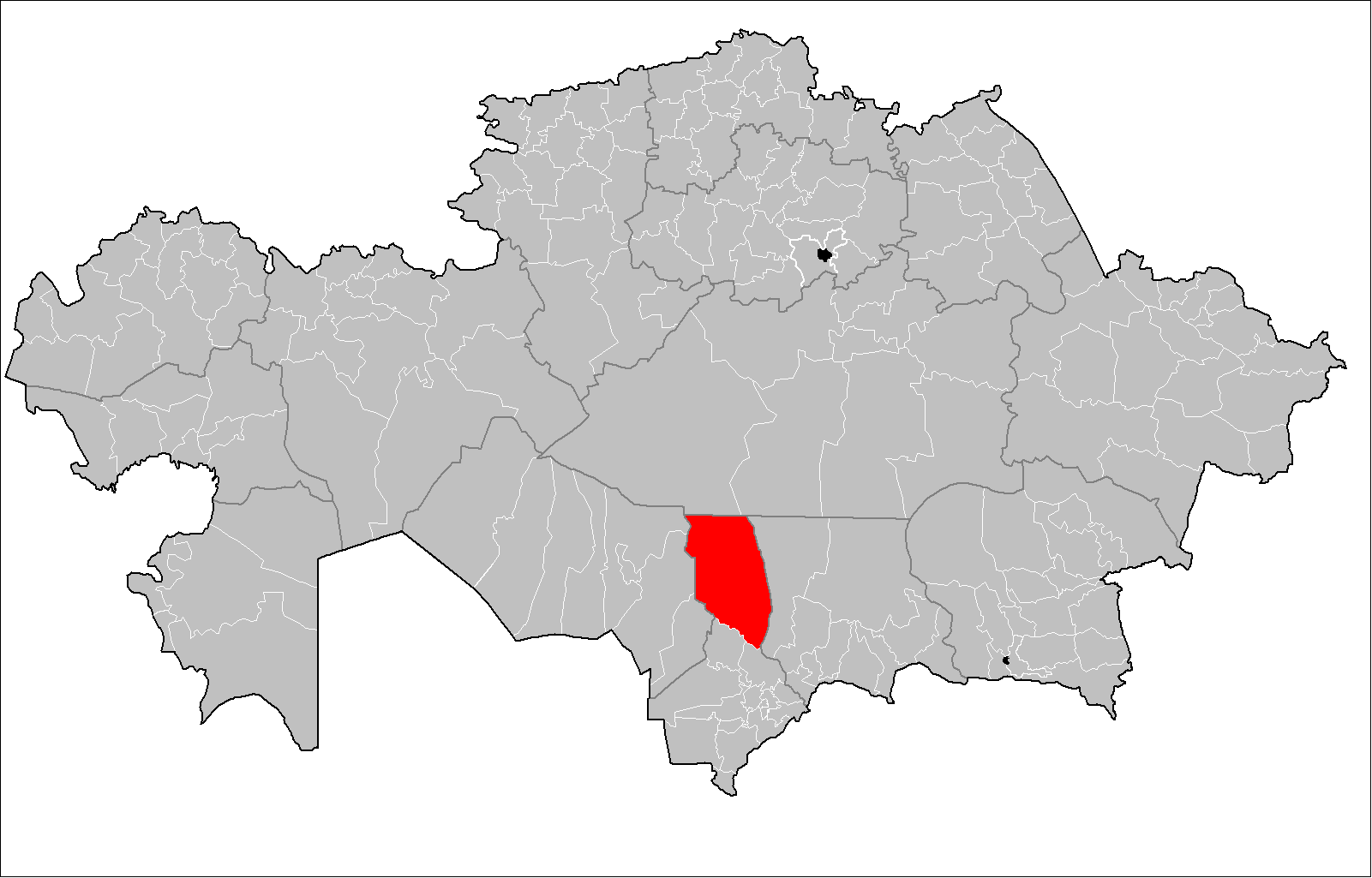
- Country: Kazakhstan
- Region: Turkistan Region
- Administrative center: Sholakkorgan

Government
  - Akim: Turysbekov Mukhit Seksenbaevich

Population (2013)
  - Total: 56,847
- Time zone: UTC+6 (East)

Sozak (Kazakh: Созақ ауданы, Sozaq audany) is a district of Turkistan Region in southern Kazakhstan. The administrative center of the district is the selo of Sholakkorgan. Population: 56,847 (2013 estimate); 51,935 (2009 census results); 47,231 (1999 census results). It contains the titular village of Sozak.

== Geography ==
The Ashchykol Depression is located in the district. The archaeological remains of the ancient Kumkent fortification are located to the southwest of Kumkent village, near lake Kyzylkol.
