= Zhaksykylysh (village) =

Zhaksykylysh Жақсықылыш
- Town
- Location in Kazakhstan
- Coordinates: 46°49′30″N 61°51′33″E
- Country: Kazakhstan
- Region: Kyzylorda Region
- District: Aral District

Population (2009)
  - Total: 4,847
- Time zone: UTC+6

Zhaksykylysh (Kazakh: Жақсықылыш) is a village in Aral District, Kyzylorda Region of southern-central Kazakhstan, It is the administrative center and the only settlement of the Zhaksykylysh District (KATO code - 433246200). Population: 4,847 (2009 census results); 4,549 (1999 census results).
