= Nazarbayev Center =

Public institution in Astana, Kazakhstan

Coordinates: 51.11654°N 71.44283°E

The Nazarbayev Center (Kazakh: Назарбаев орталығы, romanized: Nazarbaev ortalyğy, Russian: Назарбаев центр) is a multifunctional scientific, analytical, humanitarian, and educational public institution in Kazakhstan.

The center contains a museum of Kazakh history, a gallery of Kazakh artists, a national archive, an educational facility, and a library service. Founded in 2012, the center is located in Astana, Kazakhstan.

== History ==
The Nazarbayev Center was established by a decree of President Nursultan Nazarbayev on January 23, 2012. It is named after him.

One of the center's main activities is researchingthe Kazakhstan. Through its museum and educational programs, the center works to develop civic identity and patriotism in Kazakh society and to foster interaction and cooperation between state bodies, institutions of science and culture, civil society, and the media.

The center is run by acting Director Kassymbekov Mahmud Bazarkulovich and Deputy Director Eskendirov Meir Garipollaevich.

== Structure ==
- The administrative staff
- The Institute of Statehood, Security and Development
- The Service of Information and Image work
- The Service of National and International Programmes
- The Archives and Library Service
- The Museum Service
- The Storage, Restoration and Preservation of the Museum Service
- The Expository, Excursion and Exhibition Security Service

== The Institute of Statehood, Security and Development ==
The Institute of Statehood, Security and Development conducts research on the formation and development of the Republic of Kazakhstan with seminars, and scientific conferences. The institute also studies Kazakhstan's foreign policy. The center works with foreign organizations that want to strengthen international cooperation, promotion of ideas and goals of peace and sustainable development.

The main goal of the institute is to work for preservation of peace and harmony among the different ethnic groups and religious communities in Kazakhstan.

The institute publishes educational, instructional, research, educational and journalistic literature as well as research on Nursultan Nazarbayev. The institute also assists in the organization of television programs covering activities of the Nazarbayev Center, in scientific, theoretical, and practical conferences, symposiums, conferences, workshops in Kazakhstan and abroad, and organizing translations of Nazarbayev's writings.

== The Archives and Library Service ==
The Archive and Library Service has nine departments. It carries out information, educational, cultural and educational activities in order to promote Nazarbayev, the history of statehood of Kazakhstan and of the presidency

The main task of the service is adding volumes to the library, both domestic and foreign, on the history, theory and practice of statehood of Kazakhstan. It also maintains a national information resource in electronic form.

== The Museum Service ==
The museum is dedicated to identifying, recording, collecting, storing, and studying cultural values that reflect the history of Kazakhstan.

The museum contains a large collection of specimens and artifacts. It organizes exhibitions, including photo, video and audio presentations. The museum also carries out research and cultural cooperation with Kazakh and international museums, scientific, historical and cultural institutions.

=== First floor ===
==== The Independent Republic of Kazakhstan and its founder, President Nursultan Nazarbayev Exposition ====
The Nazarbayev exposition has four parts:

- "President of the Republic of Kazakhstan Nursultan Nazarbayev is a founder of the state"
- "President of the Republic of Kazakhstan Nursultan Nazarbayev and people"
- "President of the Republic of Kazakhstan Nursultan Nazarbayev is a reformer"
- "President of the Republic of Kazakhstan Nursultan Nazarbayev is a world-scale leader"

The main laws of Kazakhstan are presented in the show-windows around the hall.

- The left hand-side of the hall displays the Kazahk flag, national anthem and national emblem.
- The right hand-side of the hall displays a model of the Ak Orda Presidential Palace and the Baiterek Monument.

The hall also displays official gifts to Nazarbayev by the heads of states and delegations from different countries.

==== The Hall of Ethnography ====
The Hall of Ethnography contain items produced by skilled craftsmen. The collection includes:

- applied art
- domestic utensils made of wood, metal, leather, wool
- clothes, including variety of items depicting national life.
- women's silver adornments, including rings, bracelets, breast and hair adornments and other jewelry
- A snow-white yurt

One of the unique exhibits of the hall is "Saukele", a wedding headdress of a bride (Mangystau region, West Kazakhstan, the first half of the 19th century).

==== Kasiet Hall ====
Kasiet Hall contains:

- Items of clothing that belong to famous Kazahks.
- musical instruments from the collection of Sarybayev,
- traditional Kazakh armor
- jewelry

The clothing collection includes

- A camisole that belonged to Kara Fatima Khanum (reconstruction by A. Abdubaitova)
- Traditional bridal clothing (reconstruction by Zhailaubaeva),
- A shapan (long robe) that belonged to the diplomat Kazybek bi
- A shapan that belonged to Abylai Khan
- a kise (belt) that belonged to Baluan Sholak

=== Second floor ===
==== The Archeological Gallery ====
The Archeological Gallery displays Kazakh artifacts from the Stone Age to the late Middle Ages.

- Depictions of the Andronov people are based on paleoanthropological research. The gallery displays an "Andronov woman" (8th to 9th centuries BCE) in her reconstructed clothes with ornaments. This project was created by the archeologist Kimal Akishev.
- The gallery has a large collection of items from the Turkic Kaganate. It also has a large collection of dirhems (coins) from the Karakhanid dynasty and the city of Taraz.

==== The Ancient World Hall ====
The Ancient World Hall presents several exhibits

- Treasures and artifacts from the Issyk Kurgan (burial mound, 5th century BCE), considered the largest archeological monuments of the Saka period. The Saka warrior (4th to 3rd centuries BCE) was buried in this kurgan in ceremonial clothes . The quality of the processing of his gold things testifies that the Saka were skilled in sculptural casting, high-relief and base-relief stamping, embossing and engraving.
- Items from the Boralday burial ground (4th to 3rd centuries BCE). A Saka chieftain was buried along with 13 mummified horses decorated with leather masks, wooden horns of mountain goats, and covered with leather and gold.
- Reconstruction of the Sarmatian chieftain (3rd to 2nd centuries BCE) (Altynbekov's reconstruction). The clothes are richly inlaid with gold metal plates and plates of various configuration.

==== The World of Kazakhs Hall ====
The world of Kazakhs Hall presents the private collection of Imangali Tasmagambetov. It contains graphic and craft art of Kazakhstan. The majority of the artworks date from the 18th century to the 20th century, but also contains items from earlier eras.

The collection includes jewelry and adornments, belts for men and women, military equipment and armor, women's headdresses, and musical instruments.

=== Third floor ===
==== The Historical Gallery ====
The Historical Gallery covers the period from the Middle Ages to 1986. The exposition space is divided into following stages:

- The Kazakh Khanate from the 15th to the 17th centuries
- The history and culture of Kazakhstan from the second half of the 19th century to the beginning of the 20th century.
- The political position of the Kazakh society at the beginning of the 20th century.
- The Kazakh Soviet Socialist Republic period

=== Fourth floor ===
==== The Independent Kazakhstan Gallery ====
The Independent Kazakhstan Gallery is devoted to Islam and Orthodox Christianity. \

The exhibition consists of 100 exhibits from the funds of the museum. It includes unique books in Arabic, the Koran, rare Orthodox icons and originals of icons with foldable side flaps, a censer and candlesticks.

==== The Astana: the Past and the Present Gallery ====
The Astana: the Past and the Present gallery is about the history and culture of Astana.

The gallery includes artifacts from the ancient settlement of Bozok, historical documents, photos, life subjects, utensils, clothes and other exhibits.

== The Art Gallery ==
The Art Gallery presents the works of Kazakh artists, including:

- Kamil Mullashev
- G. Telgoziyev
- Yerbolat Tolepbay
- M. Kalimov
- Agimsaly Duzelkhanov
- B. Zaurbekov

== The Storage, Restoration and Preservation of the Museum Service ==
This service is an independent division of the center. The service consists of three departments:

- funds accounting
- funds storage
- restoration

=== Funds departments ===
Three funds included in the service have an important significance, "Independent Kazakhstan and its founder President Nursultan Nazarbayev" fund, archeology fund, fund of written sources and material culture.

Funds have the following directions, which are provision of strict state accounting of the museum funds of The Nazarbayev Center, ensuring its legal protection and creating conditions for studying and rational use of museum values. The organization of the secondary state account and ensuring safety of museum values, identification of the museum subjects and the museum collections, directed on systematic replenishment (acquisition) of funds by profile. Studying and preservation of historical and cultural monuments, promotion and dissemination of knowledge about them.

=== Restoration department ===
The Service operates three sectors,

- restoration of metal, wood, leather and bone goods. It restores leather, bone, and metal. During the restoration also carried out technical work: welding, turning, casting, molding, sanding, as well as work with chemicals.
- restoration of paintings, drawings and ceramics. It carries out restoration of oil painting, mixed painting techniques, graphics, porcelain and earthenware, ceramics (archaeological items and household items), paper (restoration of written sources and photos, mat making, restoration of books).
- restoration of materials and carpet-felt products - hands and machine restoration, computer embroidery, restoration of rarities, production of souvenirs, sewing slipcovers, sewing different products.

== Expository, Excursion and Exhibition Security Service ==
This service is an independent division of the center. It includes three departments

- Expository
- Excursion
- Exhibition Eecurity

The Expository Department creates and stages exhibitions, both in Kazakhstan and abroad, with similar institutions, museums, libraries, research and educational centers.

The Excursion Department organizes educational excursions for children . The department runs excursions in Kazakh, Russian, English, German, Chinese and Turkic languages. It also conducts research and education programs.

In addition, the main course of work of the department includes preparation of guidelines and texts on topics of museum exhibitions and fairs, realization of excursions programs, organization of tours, lectures, exhibitions and events at the museum.
