= Ayteke Bi =

Coordinates: 45°51′N 62°09′E

Ayteke Bi (Kazakh: Әйтеке би, Äiteke bi), formerly Novokazalinsk, is an urban-type settlement and the administrative center of Kazaly District in Kyzylorda Region of Kazakhstan. Population: 38,046 (2009 census results); 33,441 (1999 census results).

== See also ==
- Kazaly, a town in Kazaly district
