= Karakum =

Karakum may refer to:

- Karakum Desert, a desert in Central Asia
- Aral Karakum Desert
- Karakum (film), a 1994 Turkmen film
- Karakum Canal, Turkmenistan
- Karakum District, Turkmenistan

== See also ==
- Karakoram, a large mountain range spanning the borders of India, Pakistan and China
- Karakorum, a medieval city in Mongolia
