= Aral, Kazakhstan =

Aral Арал
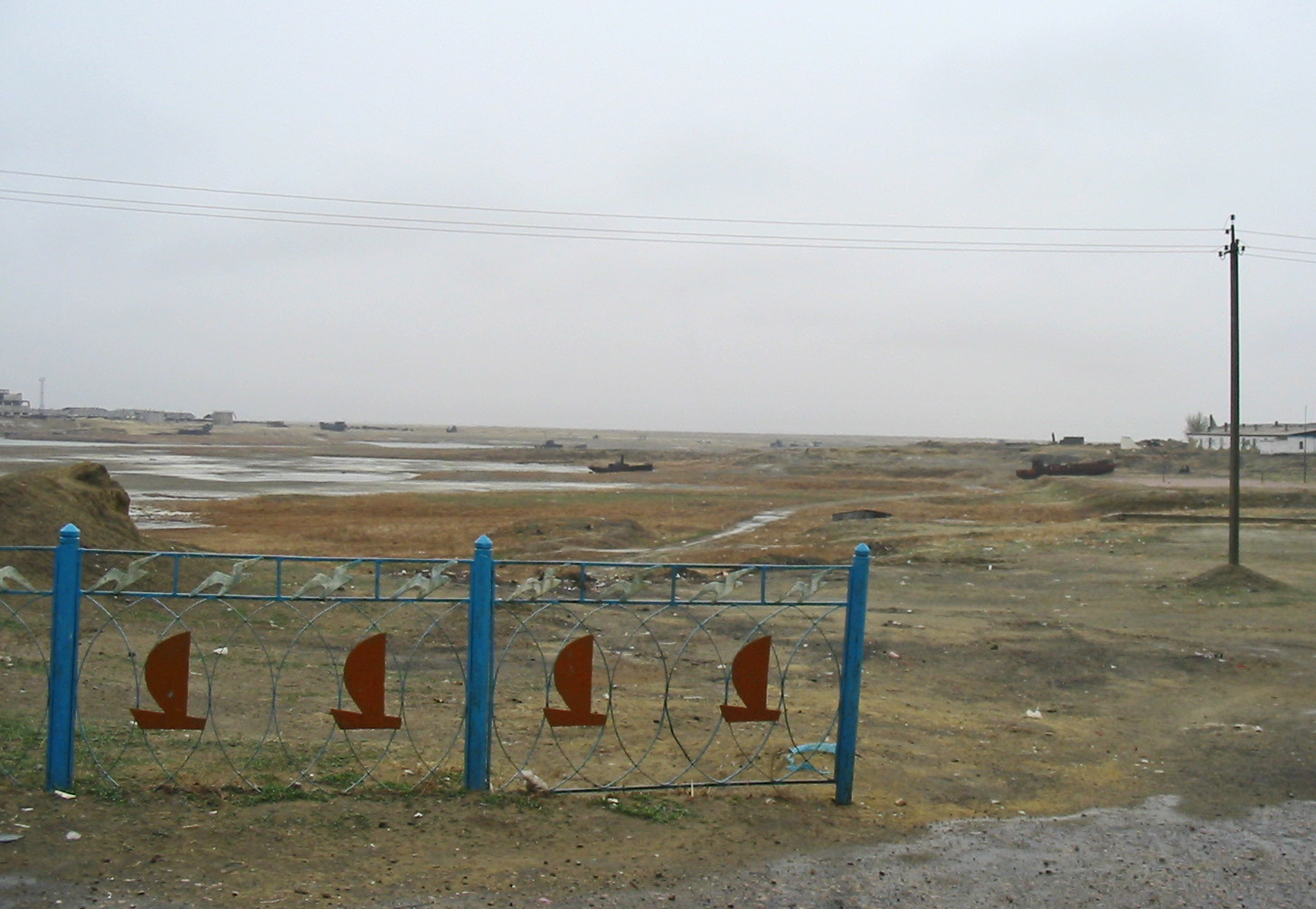

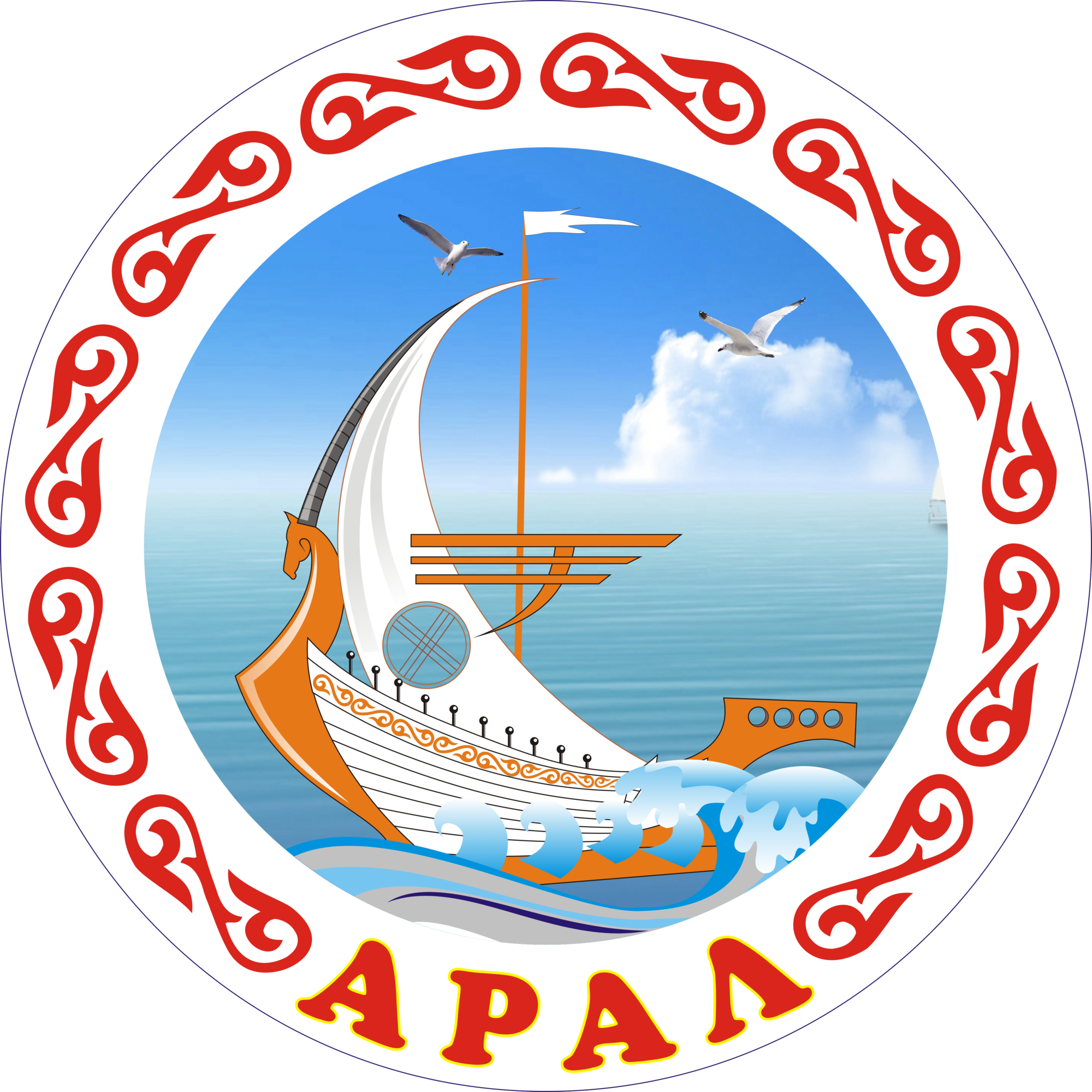
- Seal

- Location in Kazakhstan
- Coordinates: 46°47′0″N 61°40′0″E
- Country: Kazakhstan
- Region: Kyzylorda

Population (2009)
  - Total: 29,987

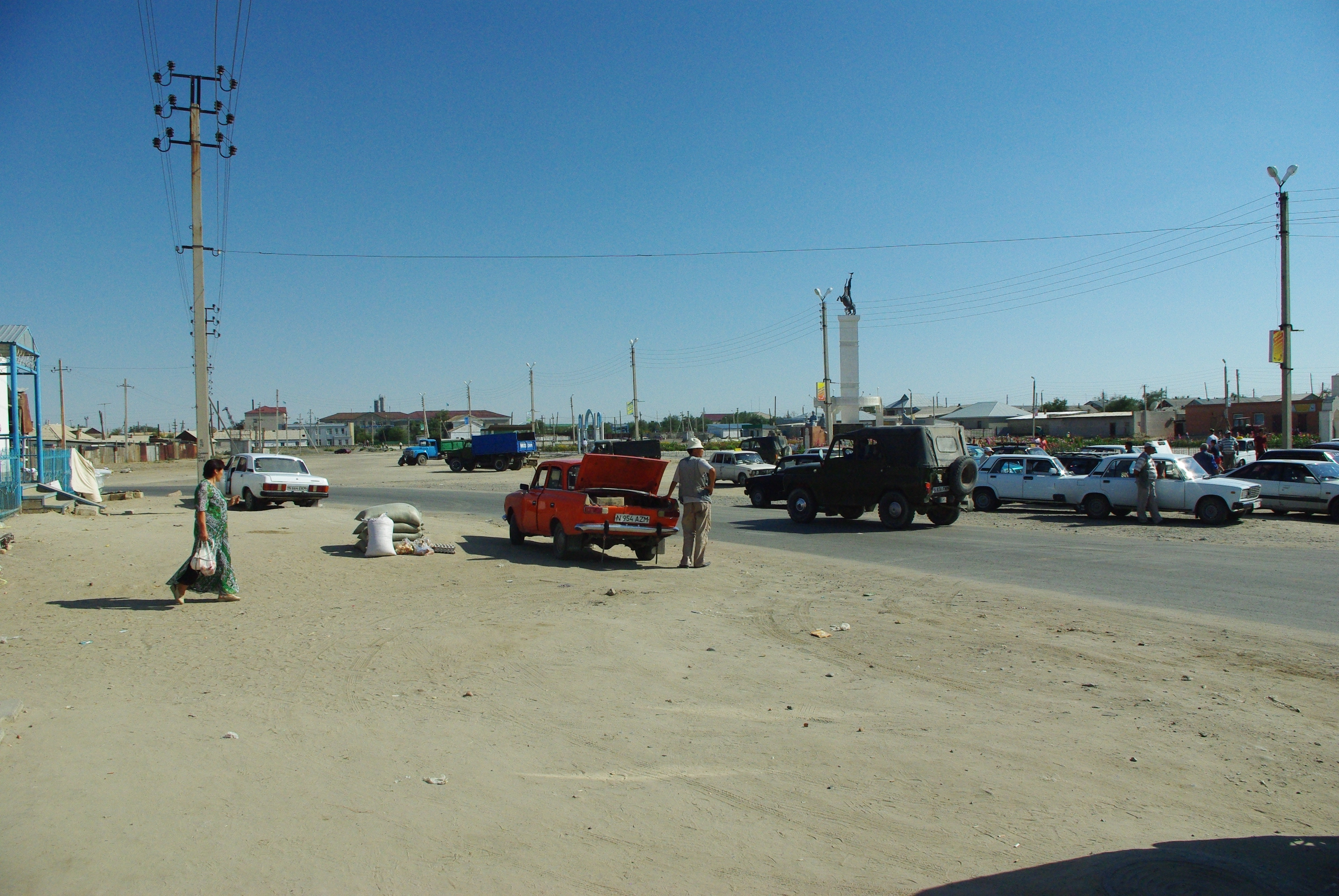
Square in Aral

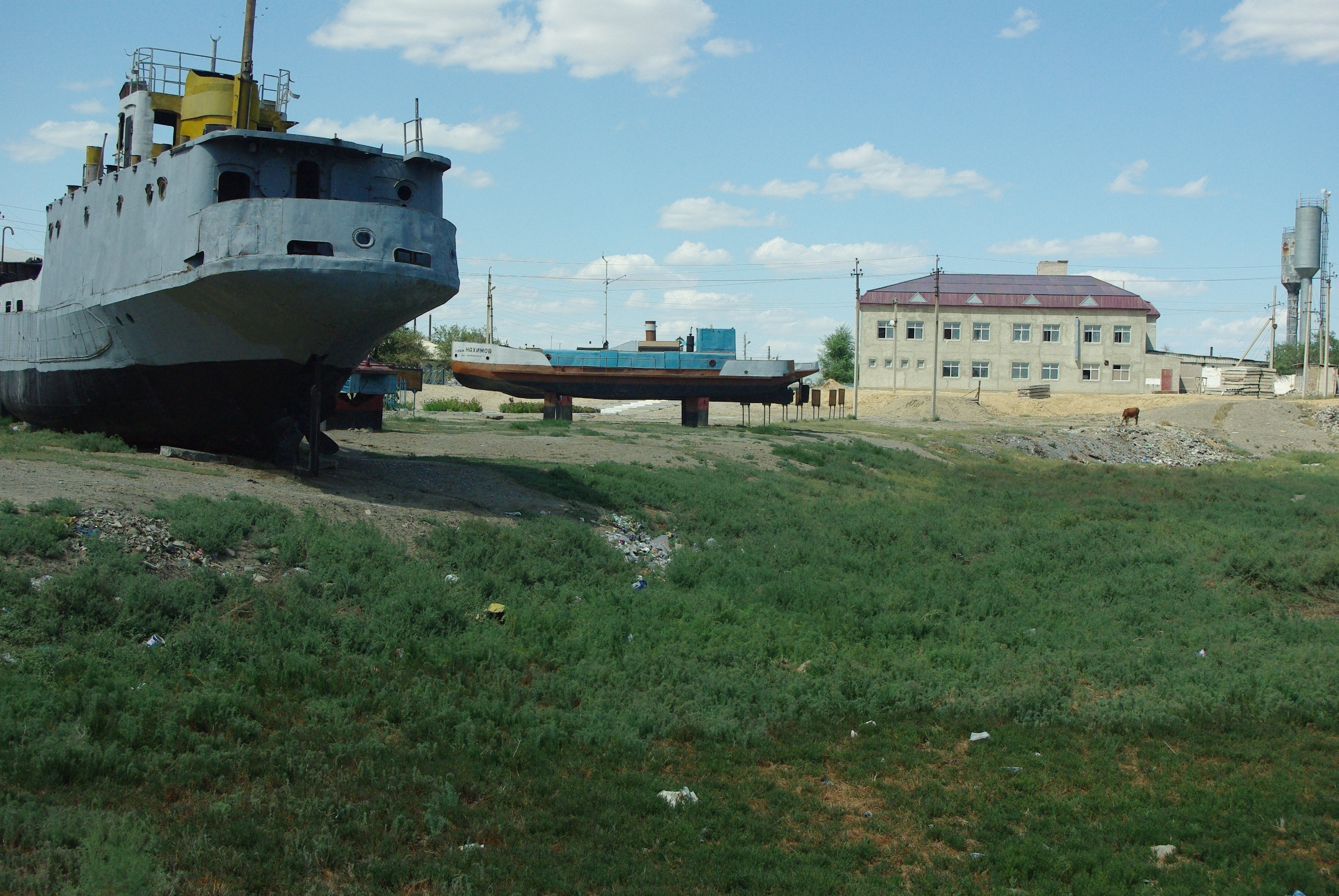
What used to be the harbour of Aral, 2009

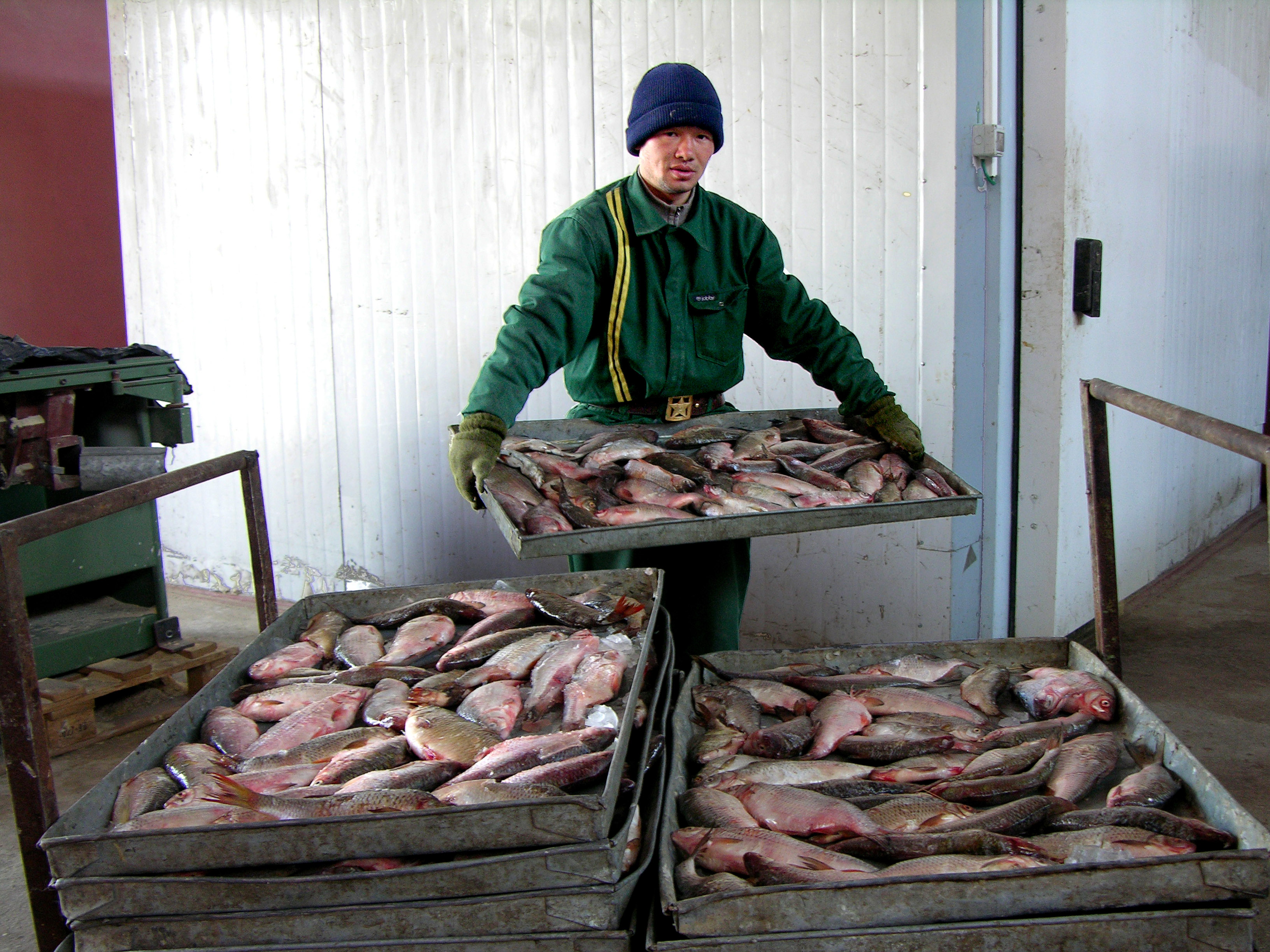
Fish factory in Aral

Aral (Kazakh: Арал, romanized: Aral), also known as Aralsk (Russian: Аральск), is a small city in south-western Kazakhstan, located in the oblast (region) of Kyzylorda. It serves as the administrative center of Aral District. Aral was formerly a fishing port and harbour city on the banks of the Aral Sea, and was a major supplier of fish to the neighboring region. Population: 29,987 (2009 census results); 30,347 (1999 census results).

== History ==
=== Early settlement ===
In 1817, there was a village Alty-Kuduk (Six Wells) near the present city of Aralsk. This is currently a railway passing-track in the southern part of the city. Since the 1870s, this was recorded as the Aralsky settlement. The development of Aralsk began when the Orenburg-Tashkent railway was being constructed (1899-1905). In 1905, the railway station was constructed and continues to operate. The official history of Aralsk began that same year.

In 1905, Russian merchants organized large fishing companies and formed a joint-stock firm in Aralsk. This was the beginning of fishery in the Aral Sea and shipbuilding plants soon followed in Aralsk.

After the Revolution, the station “Aralskoye more (sea)” with the adjoining settlement received the name Aralsk. In 1938, Aralsk and the Aralsky district became a part of newly formed Kzyl-Orda oblast of Kazakh SSR and turned into the town.

Aralsk is not to be confused with Fort Aralsk which was about 120 km south. In 1847 Russia built Raimsk, later called Fort Aralsk, near the mouth of the Syr Darya. In either 1848 or 1853 or 1855 Raimsk was abandoned and Fort Aralsk moved upriver to Fort Number One, or Kazalinsk. Further upriver were forts No. 2 and 3 which were the old Kokandi forts of Karmaktschy and Kumish-Kurgan. Fort Aralsk was used to launch ships to map the Aral Sea and as a base to attack Ak Mechet.

=== Decline ===
Since the retreat of the Aral Sea since 1960, due to diversion of the rivers flowing into it for irrigation, mainly of cotton, during the Soviet era, Aral is now completely landlocked about 12 km from the northern remnant of the Aral Sea, though this is less than the 100 km distance observed before the completion of a dam in 2005. Aral has greatly diminished in population and socioeconomic significance, resulting in high levels of unemployment. For the last 25 years it has not been possible to see the sea from the town. There are also serious health problems for the local population caused by airborne toxic chemicals exposed to the wind by the retreating waters and, possibly, from chemical and biological agents unsafely stored on the island of Vozrozhdeniya.

=== Aral smallpox incident ===
In 1971, a massive public health response to a smallpox outbreak in Aral ensued once the disease was recognized as resulting from the release of weaponized smallpox from a nearby biological weapons test site. In less than 2 weeks, approximately 50,000 residents of Aral were vaccinated. Household quarantine of potentially exposed individuals was enacted, and hundreds were isolated in a makeshift facility at the edge of the city. All traffic in and out of the city was stopped, and approximately 54,000 square feet of living space and 18 metric tons of household goods were decontaminated by health officials. The original outbreak sickened ten people in Aral, of whom 3 died.

== Climate ==
Aral has a cold desert climate (Köppen: BWk; Trewartha: BWac) with frigid winters and hot summers.

Climate data for Aral (1991–2020, extremes 1905–present)
Month	Jan	Feb	Mar	Apr	May	Jun	Jul	Aug	Sep	Oct	Nov	Dec	Year
Record high °C (°F)	6.3 (43.3)	17.8 (64.0)	29.2 (84.6)	36.0 (96.8)	39.9 (103.8)	44.6 (112.3)	44.8 (112.6)	44.4 (111.9)	41.0 (105.8)	32.6 (90.7)	24.7 (76.5)	10.7 (51.3)	44.8 (112.6)
Mean daily maximum °C (°F)	−6.8 (19.8)	−4.9 (23.2)	5.3 (41.5)	18.2 (64.8)	26.5 (79.7)	32.4 (90.3)	34.2 (93.6)	32.6 (90.7)	25.2 (77.4)	15.8 (60.4)	4.0 (39.2)	−4.2 (24.4)	14.9 (58.8)
Daily mean °C (°F)	−10.7 (12.7)	−9.4 (15.1)	0.0 (32.0)	11.8 (53.2)	19.7 (67.5)	25.8 (78.4)	27.7 (81.9)	25.7 (78.3)	18.1 (64.6)	9.1 (48.4)	−0.6 (30.9)	−7.9 (17.8)	9.1 (48.4)
Mean daily minimum °C (°F)	−14.4 (6.1)	−13.6 (7.5)	−4.4 (24.1)	5.8 (42.4)	12.7 (54.9)	18.4 (65.1)	20.5 (68.9)	18.4 (65.1)	11.2 (52.2)	3.3 (37.9)	−4.4 (24.1)	−11.4 (11.5)	3.5 (38.3)
Record low °C (°F)	−37.9 (−36.2)	−37.2 (−35.0)	−36.1 (−33.0)	−15.9 (3.4)	−5.4 (22.3)	2.2 (36.0)	8.2 (46.8)	5.0 (41.0)	−4.4 (24.1)	−15.7 (3.7)	−31.6 (−24.9)	−34.8 (−30.6)	−37.9 (−36.2)
Average precipitation mm (inches)	11 (0.4)	13 (0.5)	16 (0.6)	14 (0.6)	14 (0.6)	12 (0.5)	8 (0.3)	6 (0.2)	4 (0.2)	14 (0.6)	14 (0.6)	13 (0.5)	139 (5.5)
Average extreme snow depth cm (inches)	8 (3.1)	7 (2.8)	3 (1.2)	0 (0)	0 (0)	0 (0)	0 (0)	0 (0)	0 (0)	0 (0)	0 (0)	3 (1.2)	8 (3.1)
Average rainy days	4	3	6	8	10	7	8	5	5	7	7	5	75
Average snowy days	16	12	7	1	0	0	0	0	0	1	5	13	55
Average relative humidity (%)	84	82	76	53	45	37	37	37	43	58	76	82	59
Mean monthly sunshine hours	124	168	198	260	337	363	377	360	296	218	139	106	2,946
Source 1: Pogoda.ru.net
Source 2: NOAA (sun, 1961–1990)
