= V $ X V PRiNCE =

Kazakh rapper (born 1990)

- Born: Askhat Tanirbergenovich Rysbekov; April 17, 1990 (age 36); Kazaly, Kazakh SSR, Soviet Union

Askhat Tanirbergenovich Rysbekov (Kazakh: Асхат Тәңірбергенұлы Рысбеков; born April 17, 1990, Kazakh SSR, Kazakhstan, Kazaly), known professionally as V $ X V PRiNCE is a Kazakh rapper, hip hop artist and songwriter.

== Biography ==
Askhat's upbringing took place in a traditional family in the city of Almaty. From an early age, he was attracted to rap and hip-hop songs, as these musical styles were especially popular in Kazakhstan.

During his studies, he understood that notebooks and books would not become his constant companions in life. Askhat began to make plans for devoting his life to music.

The first popular track was released by the artist in 2015 under the title "#selfmade".

Since 2015, he has been organizing the VERNY group. It was this musical group that brought the guy popularity not only in his native country, but also abroad. As for the Kazakh show business, Askhat attracted special attention, and also took a good position in the country's music charts.

== Discography ==
- «A$sorti»
- «Не за горами»
- «VERNЫЙ»
- «727»
- «Vol.1»
- «30» (2020)
- NERVЫ (2021)
- NOVЫЙ (2022)
- Папа (2023)
- Әліппе (2023)
- Вкусный (2024)
- Сатпаева 32 (2025)
- BUSiNESS (SiDE A) (2025)

== Awards and nominations ==
- Victory in the nomination "Breakthrough of the Year" according to Yandex.Music
