= Aral Karakum Desert =

Desert in central Kazakhstan

Aral Karakum
- Арал қарақұмы
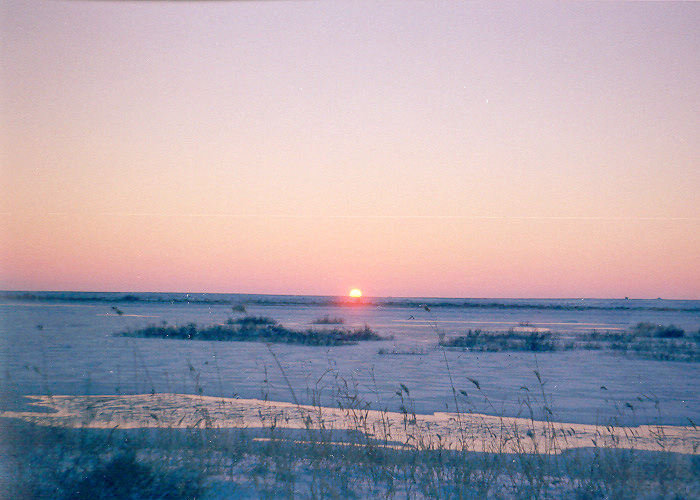

- Location within Kazakhstan
- Floor elevation: 55 m (180 ft)
- Area: 40,000 km^{2} (15,000 mi^{2})

Geology
- Type: Desert

Geography
- Country: Kazakhstan
- Coordinates: 46.6883°N 63.0192°E
- Interactive map of Aral Karakum

Aral Karakum (Kazakh: Арал қарақұмы / Aral qaraqumy, IPA: [ɑˈrɑɫ qɑˌrɑqʊˈmɤ]; Russian: Приаральские Каракумы, IPA: [prʲɪ(j)ɐˈralʲskʲɪje kərɐˈkumɨ]) is a desert in Kazakhstan, situated northeast of the Aral Sea.

Most of the desert territory is located within the Aral and Kazaly districts of the Kyzylorda Region. A small sector is part of the southeastern end of the Aktobe Region and the southwestern fringes of the Karaganda Region.

== Geography ==
The desert borders on the Syr Darya river to the south. The desert covers an area of 40,000 km^{2} (15,000 sq mi).

The landscape in the region is quite flat, with a height that varies from 55 to 118 metres (180 to 387 ft) above mean sea level. The dunes can reach heights of around 25 m (82 ft). The area is very dry, and the dried-out riverbeds usually only carry water during springtime, when the winter snow melts. Annual precipitation is around 120 mm (4.7 in). Lake Zhaksykylysh is located in the western part.

== Climate ==
Winter lasts from mid-November to mid-March, with varying cloud cover and frequent fog. Mean temperature during daytime is −5–10 °C (23–50 °F), and at night around −25 °C (−13 °F). The lowest recorded temperature is −42 °C (−44 °F). However, at any time during winter, mild weather is possible. Precipitation falls mostly in the winter as snow. Snow cover is usually around 15 cm (5.9 in) deep, but can reach 30 cm (12 in).

Summer lasts from May to mid-September. Daytime temperatures normally range 30–35 °C (86–95 °F), but temperatures up to 43 °C (109 °F) have been recorded. At night, the temperature drops to 15–18 °C (59–64 °F). During summer, there are often dry winds and dust storms.

== Flora ==
The Aral Karakum has some vegetation, mainly grasses, and it is being used for grazing of sheep.
