= Jalagash =

Settlement in Kazakhstan

Coordinates: 45°05′N 64°40′E

Jalagash (Kazakh: Жалағаш, Jalağaş) is an urban-type settlement and the administrative center of Jalagash District in Kyzylorda Region of Kazakhstan.
