= Zinesh Abisheva =

Kazakh metallurgist and chemical engineer (1947–2021)

- Born: 23 January 1947; Terenozek, Kyzylorda, Kazakh Soviet Socialist Republic
- Died: 13 May 2021 (aged 74); Almaty, Kazakhstan
- Education: Moscow State University of Fine Chemical Technologies
- Scientific career
- Fields: Chemical engineering, metallurgy
- Institutions: Ministry of Education and Science of the Republic of Kazakhstan; Satbayev University

Zinesh Sadyrovna Abisheva (Kazakh: Зейнеш Садырқызы Әбішева, 23 January 1947 – 13 May 2021) was a Kazakh metallurgist, chemical engineer, civil servant and educator. She developed new technologies for the extraction of gallium, osmium, and rhenium and developed processing technologies.

== Biography ==
Abisheva was born on 23 January 1947 in Terenozek, Kyzylorda, Kazakh Soviet Socialist Republic. She studied at the Moscow State University of Fine Chemical Technologies named after Lomonosov (MITHT) in Moscow, Soviet Union, graduating in 1971. She spoke Kazakh, Russian and English.

Abisheva was a specialist in the field of the metallurgy of rare metals and the chemistry of metallurgical processes. She developed new technologies for the extraction of gallium, osmium, and rhenium and developed processing technologies.

From 1987 to 2011, Abisheva worked at the Ministry of Education and Science of the Republic of Kazakhstan. During this period, she was also the project director of the International Association for the Promotion of Cooperation with Scientists from the Independent States of the former Soviet Union from 2000 to 2003. From 2016 to 2019, Abisheva worked as director of the Mining and Metallurgical Institute of Satbayev University in Almaty, Kazakhstan. In 2019, she became a research professor at Satbayev University.

Abisheva was the most cited Kazakh author in the field of metallurgy. She also sat on the editorial boards of international journals, including Hydrometallurgy, Tsvetnye Metally (Russia). Горный журнал Казахстана (Mining Journal of Kazakhstan) and the Herald of the Kola Science Center of RAS (Russia).

Abisheva died on 13 May 2021 in Almaty, Kazakhstan, aged 75.

== Awards ==
- Inventor of the USSR (1987)
- Certificate of Honour from the President of the Republic of Kazakhstan (2005)
- Diploma of the Ministry of Industry and Trade of Kazakhstan (2005)
- World Intellectual Property Organization Medal (2011)
- Honoured Worker of the Nuclear Industry of the Republic of Kazakhstan (2019)
- Order of Kurmet (2019)
