= Zhaksykylysh =

Lake in the country of Kazakhstan

- Жақсықылыш
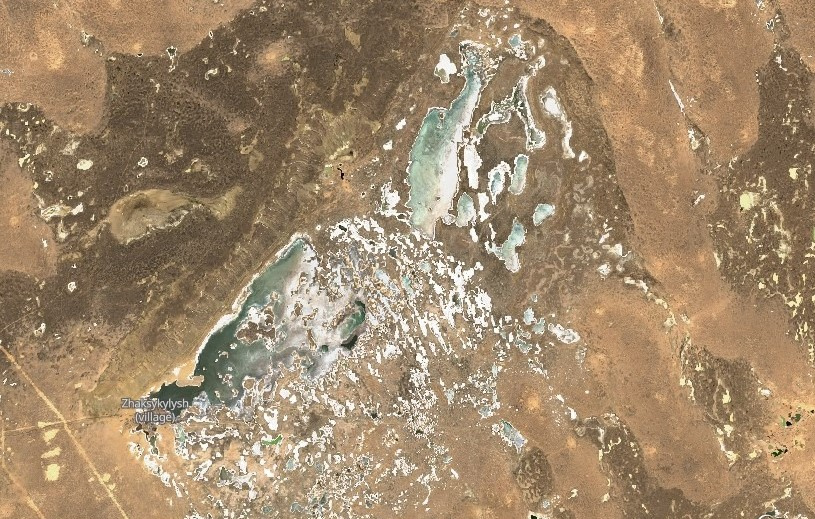
- Sentinel-2 image of the lake in April

- Location in Kazakhstan
- Location: Aral Karakum
- Coordinates: 46°55′N 62°00′E
- Type: endorheic
- Basin countries: Kazakhstan
- Surface area: 74.5 square kilometers (28.8 sq mi)
- Surface elevation: 48 meters (157 ft)

Zhaksykylysh (Kazakh: Жақсықылыш; Russian: Жаксыкылыш) is a salt lake in Aral District, Kyzylorda Region, Kazakhstan.

Table salt is being mined in Zhaksykylysh since 1925. Nowadays the Kyzylorda-based Araltuz company carries out the salt-mining operations. Over 99% of the refined table salt produced in Kazakhstan is extracted at the Zhaksykylysh salt lakes, of which about 66% is exported.

== Geography ==
Zhaksykylysh is an endorheic lake cluster located about 30 kilometers (19 mi) to the northeast of the Aral Sea in the western part of the Aral Karakum Desert region. The Zhaksykylysh Range, a mountain chain of moderate elevation, limits the lake to the northwest. A multitude of smaller lakes and salt flats fan-out to the east in the adjoining flat land.

Zhaksykylysh was affected by the drying of the Aral Sea basin in recent decades. Currently the lake surface has shrunk. The lake is shallow and has water only following the melting of the snows in the spring. By July it turns into a dry, salt-covered depression. The thickness of the salt layer in the lake ranges between 1 meter (3 ft 3 in) and 2 meters (6 ft 7 in). The basin of the Zhaksykylysh is a grazing ground for local cattle during the spring, before the withering of the grass in the summer.

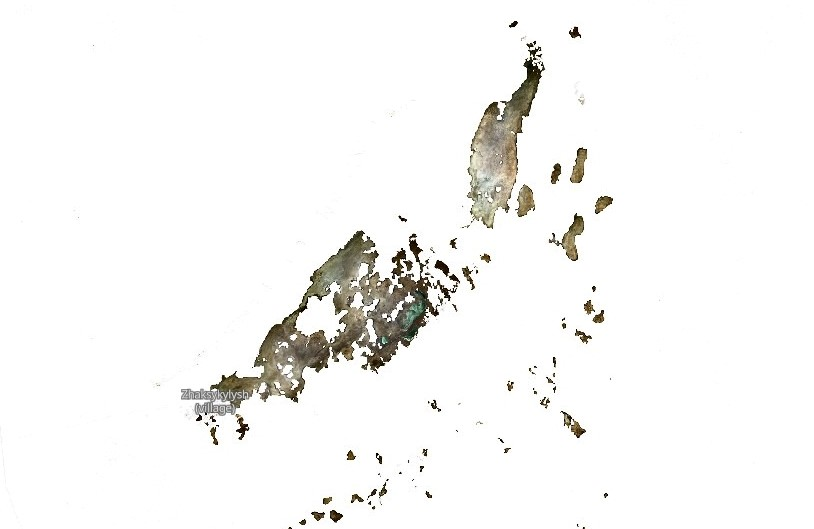
Sentinel-2 image of the lake group in February 2018.

== See also ==
- List of lakes of Kazakhstan
