= Terenozek =

- Town
- Location in Kazakhstan
- Coordinates: 45°3′3″N 64°58′30″E
- Country: Kazakhstan
- Region: Kyzylorda Region
- District: Syrdariya District
- Time zone: UTC+6 (Omsk Time)

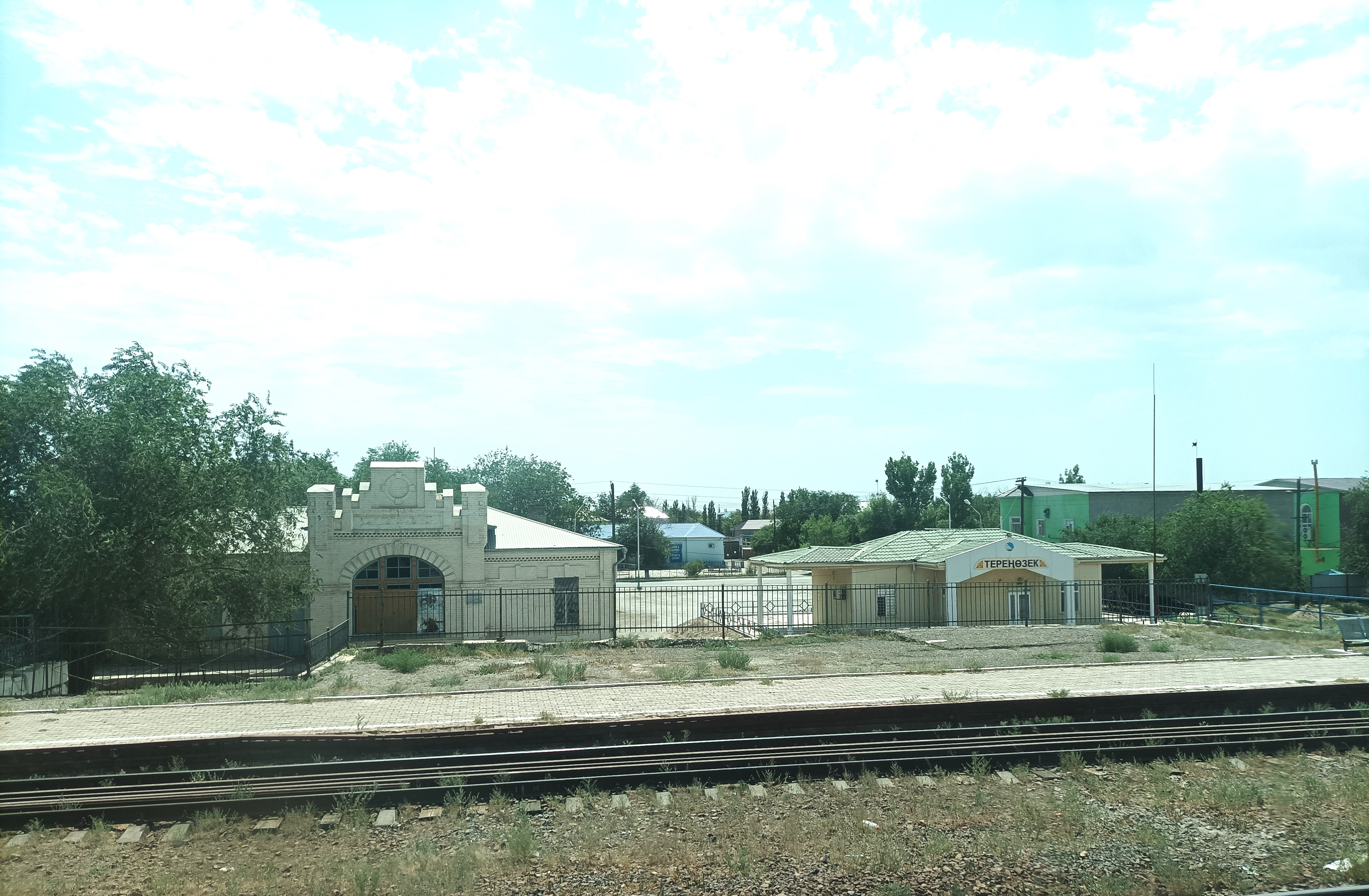
Terenozek.

Terenozek (Kazakh: Тереңөзек, Tereñözek) is an urban-type settlement and the administrative centre of Syrdariya District of Kyzylorda Region of southern-central Kazakhstan. It lies on the northern bank of the Syr Darya. Population: 9,132 (2009 census results); 9,408 (1999 census results).

== Notable people ==
- Zinesh Abisheva (1947–2021), metallurgist
- Pu Vladimir Nikolayevich, (1947-), writer, now living in Korea.
