= Kamyslybas =

Lake in Kazakhstan

- Қамыстыбас
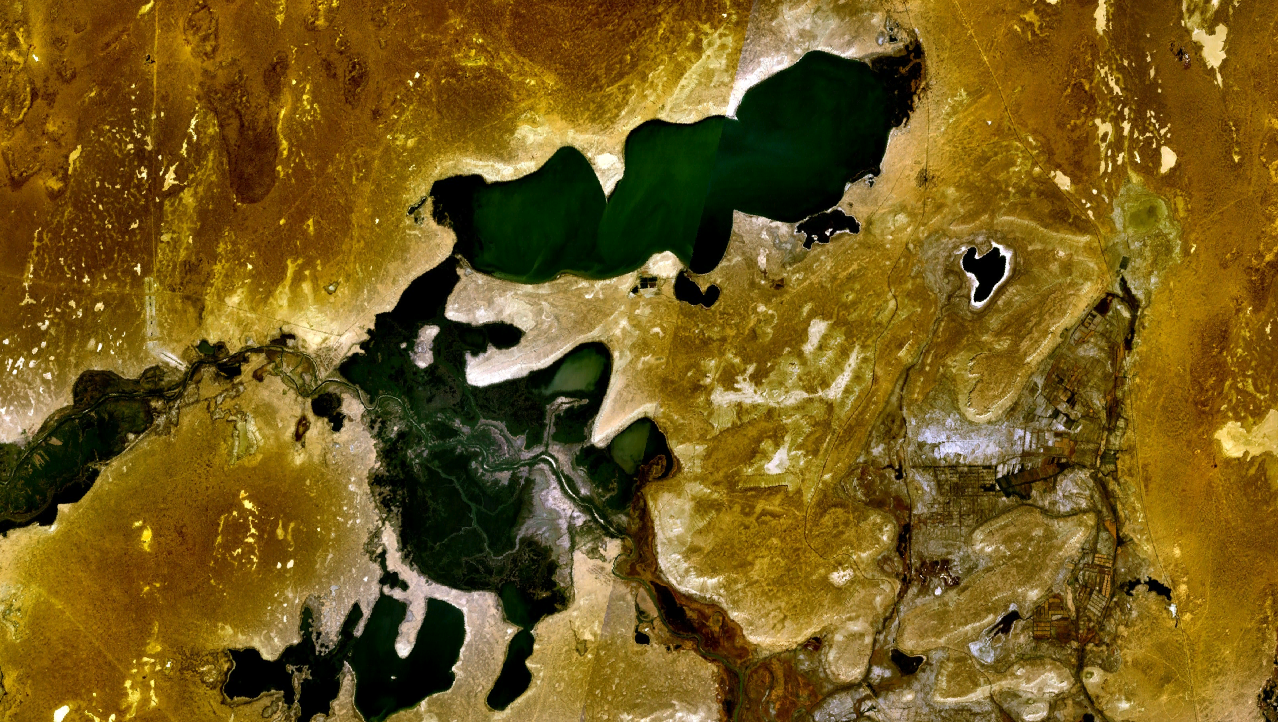
- Lake Kamyslybas, as seen from space.

- Location within Kazakhstan
- Location: Kyzylorda Region
- Coordinates: 46.199722°N 61.799444°E
- Type: endorheic lake
- Basin countries: Kazakhstan
- Max. length: 30 km (19 mi)
- Max. width: 8 km (5.0 mi)
- Surface area: 176 km^{2} (68 sq mi)
- Max. depth: 10 meters (33 ft)
- Water volume: ca 980 km^{3} (240 cu mi)
- Shore length^{1}: 115.6 km (71.8 mi)
- Surface elevation: 56 meters (184 ft)
- ^{1} Shore length is not a well-defined measure.

Kamyslybas (Kazakh: Қамыстыбас, Qamystybas) is a large saltwater lake in the Kyzylorda Region, Kazakhstan. It has an area of 176 km^{2}, although the water level in the lake often fluctuates.

The health of lake Kamyslybas is directly affected by the Aral Sea, which experienced increasing salinization and desiccation as the result of excessive and unsustainable expansion of irrigation that have drained both the Syr Darya and the Amu Darya, the other major tributary river, and seriously damaged their deltas. Similarly to attempts to rehabilitate and preserve the lower Amu Darya delta, efforts are also underway to improve lakes such as Kamyslybas and Tushchibas.

== Geography ==
It has a maximum depth of 10 meters with a coastline 116 km long at an elevation of 58 meters above sea level. It is the largest body of water in the Kamyslybas lake system. It lies in the northern part of Syr Darya's delta, to which it is connected by a canal, and the water level in the lake is affected by fluctuations on the quantity of water from the Syr-Darya. Its salinity can fluctuate significantly, sometimes reaching the point of becoming brine.

== Fauna ==
Since the 1960s the lake has been well-known for its rich and diverse stocks of fish and wetland species, including carp, pike, catfish, perch, and waterfowl such as ducks, geese, and sandpipers. In 1977, water was pumped into the lake from the Syr-Darya to maintain a sufficient water depth, which also helped maintain the average fishing catches and the aquaculture industry around the lake. Lake Kamyslybas is used as a fishery.
