= Arys (lake) =

Lake in the country of Kazakhstan

- Арыс
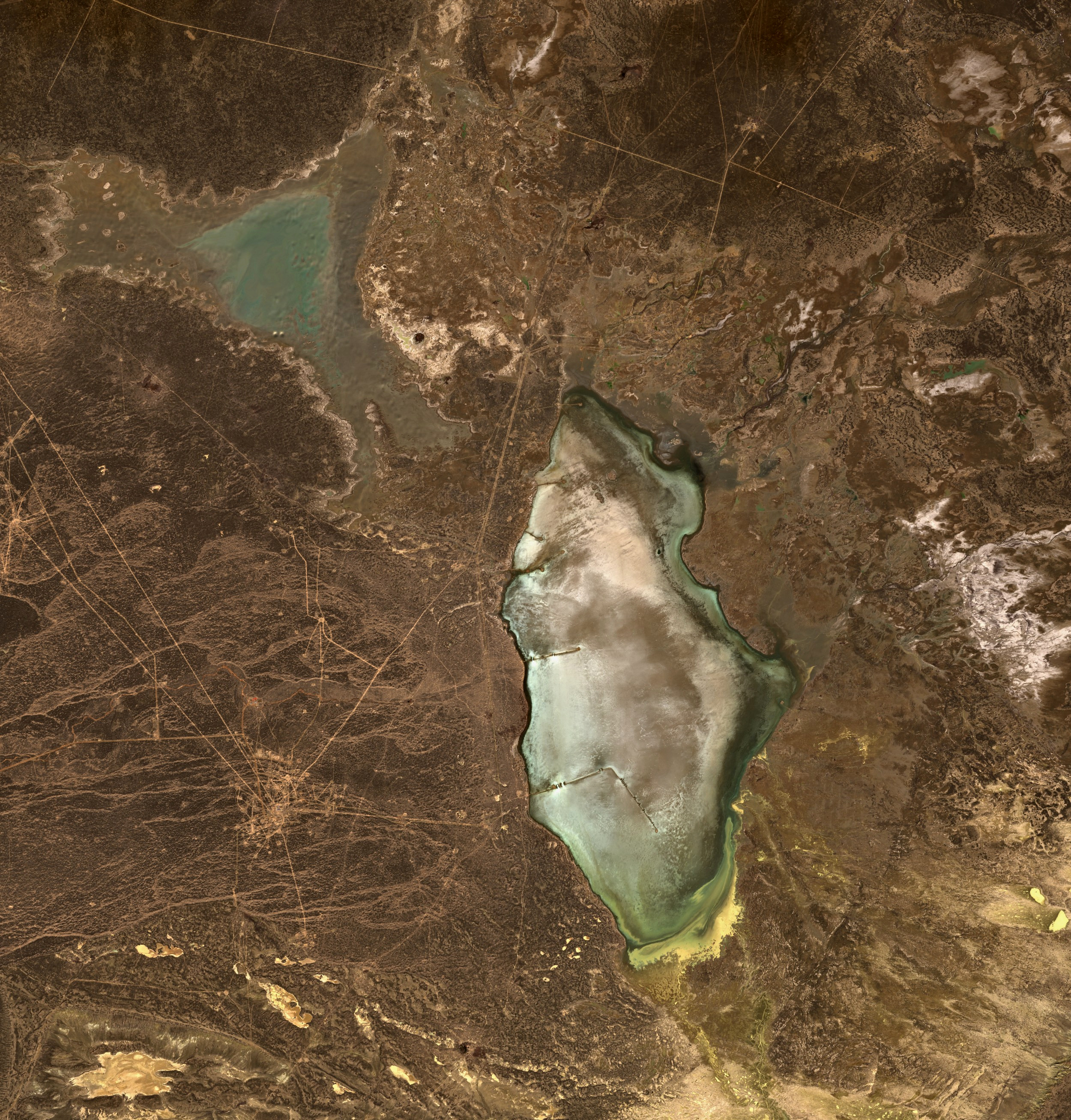
- Sentinel-2 image of the lake in 2020

- Location in Kazakhstan
- Location: Betpak-Dala
- Coordinates: 45°46′N 66°20′E
- Type: endorheic
- Catchment area: 15,900 square kilometers (6,100 sq mi)
- Basin countries: Kazakhstan
- Max. length: 21.2 kilometers (13.2 mi)
- Max. width: 9.5 kilometers (5.9 mi)
- Surface area: 124.5 square kilometers (48.1 sq mi) to 173 square kilometers (67 sq mi)
- Surface elevation: 56 meters (184 ft)

Arys (Kazakh: Арыс; Russian: Арыс), is a salt lake in Syrdariya District, Kyzylorda Region, Kazakhstan.

The waters of the lake are mineral-rich, averaging 32.5 g/L (0.00117 lb/cu in) and containing, besides sodium chloride, iodine, fluorine, bromine, boron, zinc, manganese and iron.

== Geography ==
The lake lies in the western part of the Betpak-Dala semi-desert region, about 140 kilometers (87 mi) to the NNE of Kyzylorda town. In the same manner as most lakes in the region, Arys is an endorheic lake which is fed by underground sources located near the shores or along the lake bottom.

The lake is shallow and its bottom is flat, covered with a 15 centimeters (5.9 in) to 50 centimeters (20 in) thick layer of salt. Since 1968 Arys has completely dried up in the summer on a yearly basis.

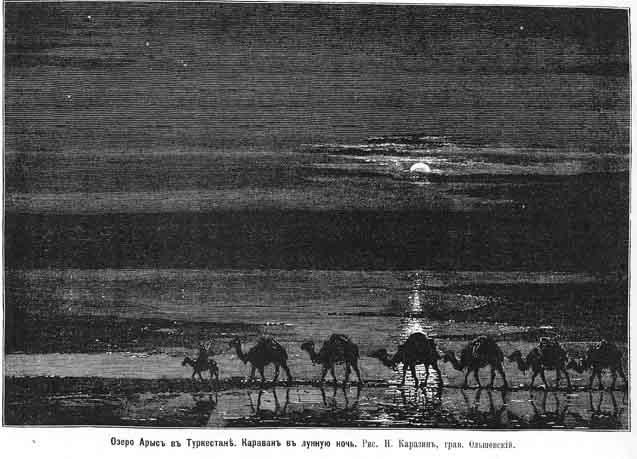
1874 image of a caravan crossing lake Arys at night.

== See also ==
- List of lakes of Kazakhstan
