= Syrdariya District =

Coordinates: 45°34′12″N 65°36′00″E

Syrdariya Сырдария
- District
- Сырдария ауданы
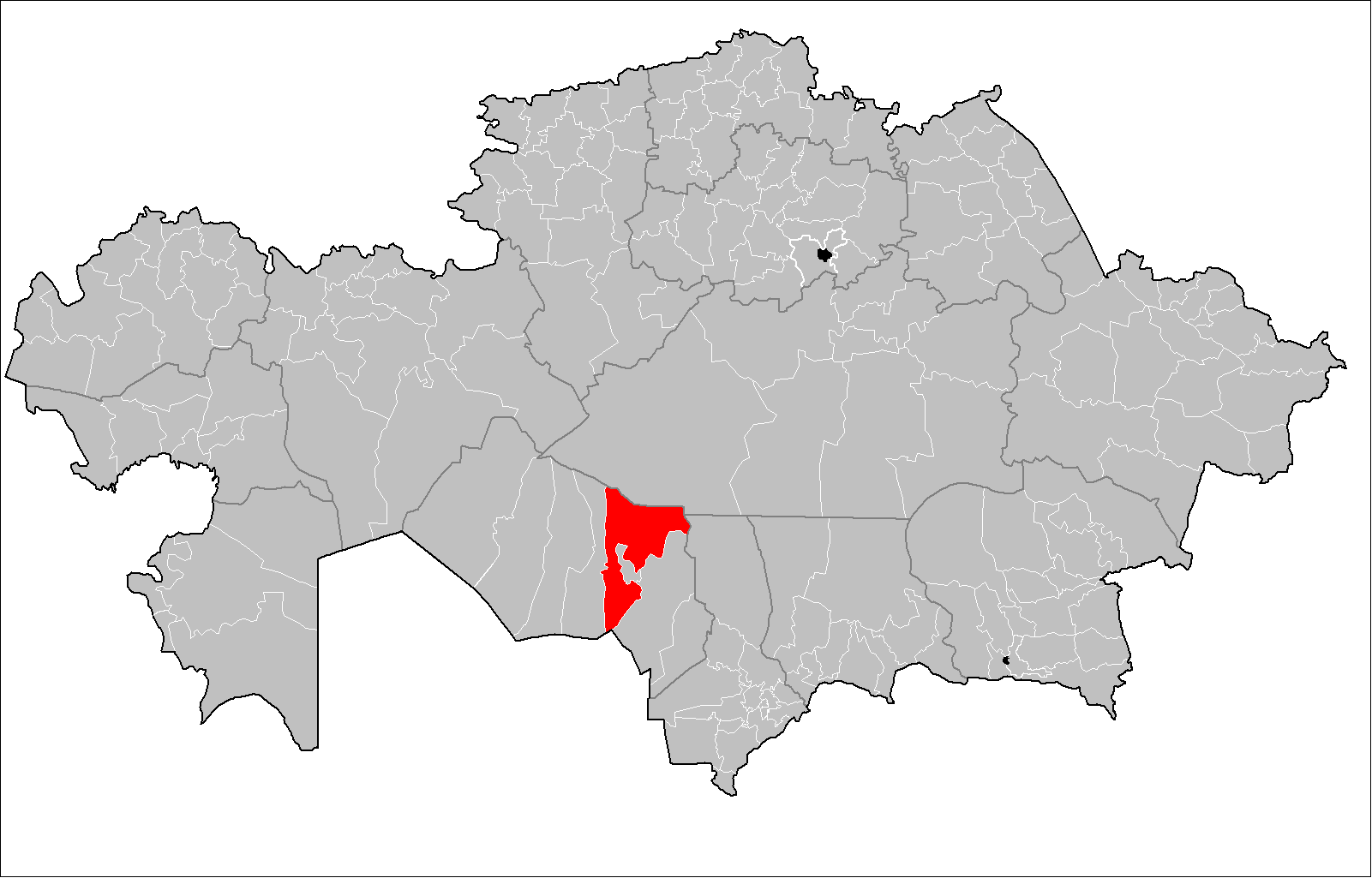
- Country: Kazakhstan
- Region: Kyzylorda Region
- Administrative center: Terenozek

Government
  - Akim: Berik Sarmenbayev

Population (2013)
  - Total: 39,559
- Time zone: UTC+6 (East)

Syrdariya (Kazakh: Сырдария ауданы, Syrdariia audany) is a district of Kyzylorda Region in southern Kazakhstan. The administrative center of the district is the town of Terenozek. Population: 39,559 (2013 estimate); 38,085 (2009 census results); 39,100 (1999 census results).

== Geography ==
Lake Arys is located in the district.
