= Jalagash District =

Coordinates: 44°34′12″N 64°03′00″E

Jalagash
- District
- Жалағаш ауданы
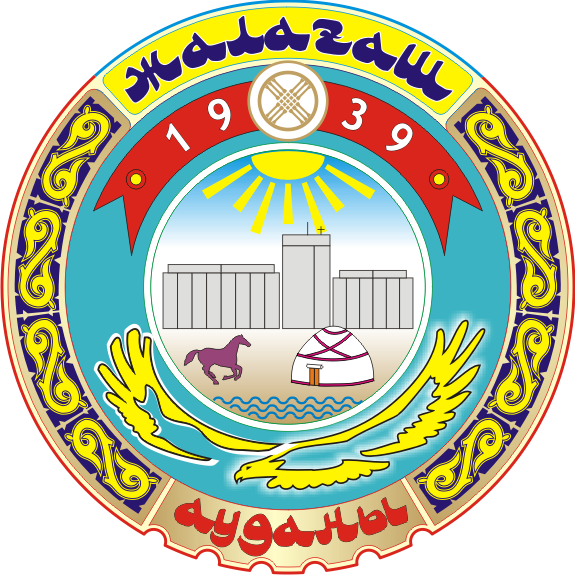
- Seal

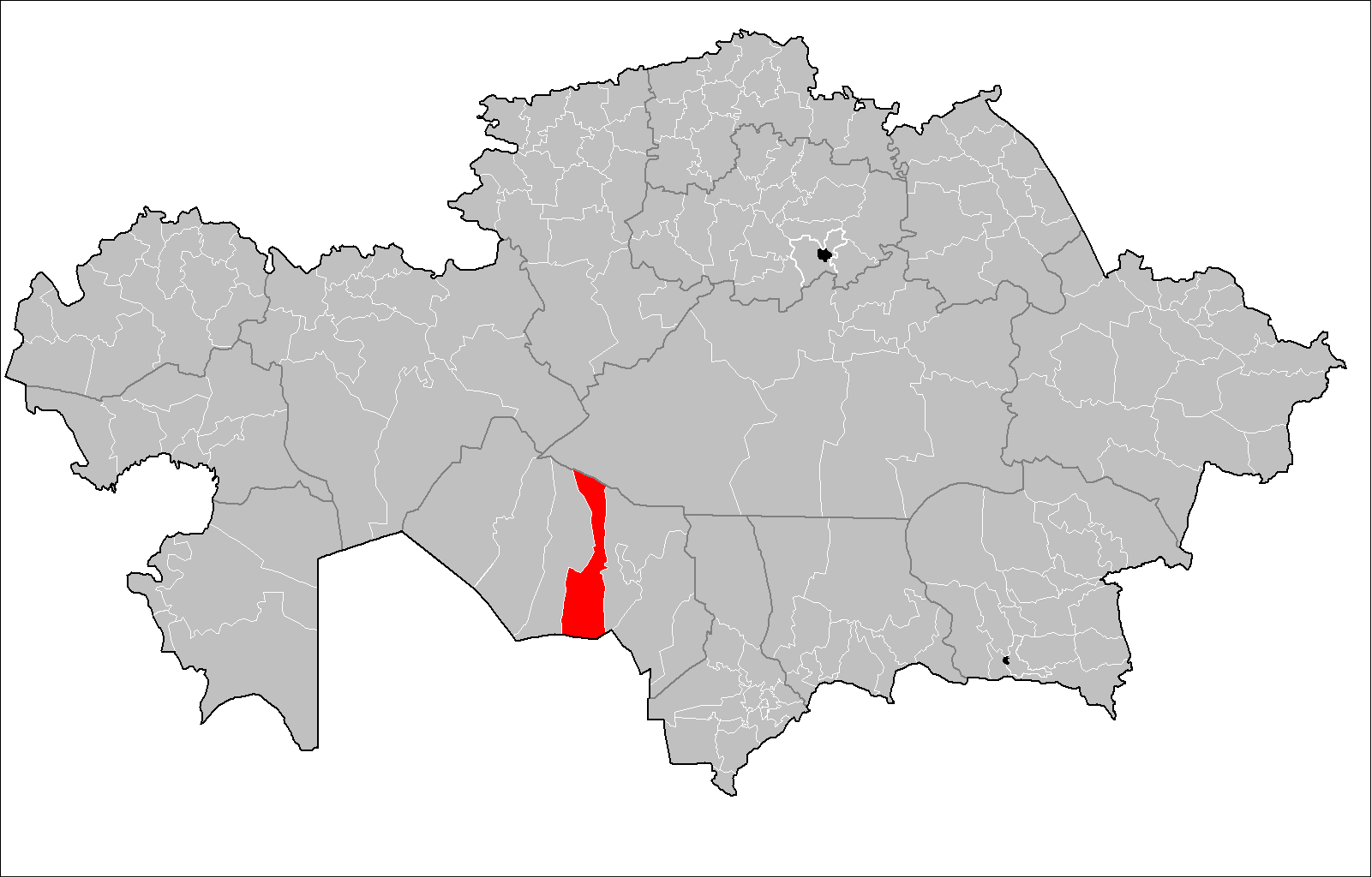
- Country: Kazakhstan
- Region: Kyzylorda Region
- Administrative center: Jalagash

Government
  - akim: Esjanov Askarbek Temirbekovich

Population (2013)
  - Total: 36,481
- Time zone: UTC+6 (East)
- Website: www.zhalagash.gov.kz

Jalagash (Kazakh: Жалағаш ауданы, Jalağaş audany) is a district of Kyzylorda Region in southern Kazakhstan. The administrative center of the district is the urban-type settlement of Jalagash. Population: 36,481 (2013 estimate); 39,553 (2009 census results); 35,695 (1999 census results).
