= Kyzylorda Region =

Region in southern Kazakhstan

Qyzylorda Region Қызылорда облысы (Kazakh) Кызылординская область (Russian)
- Region
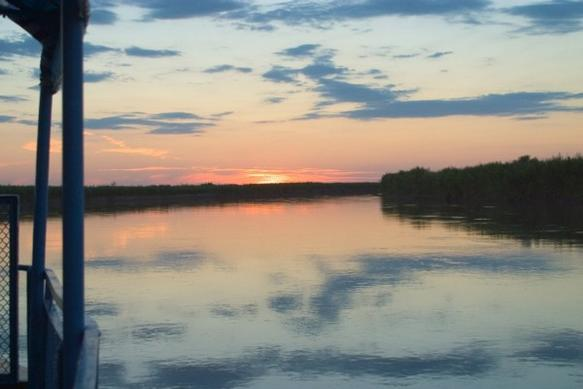
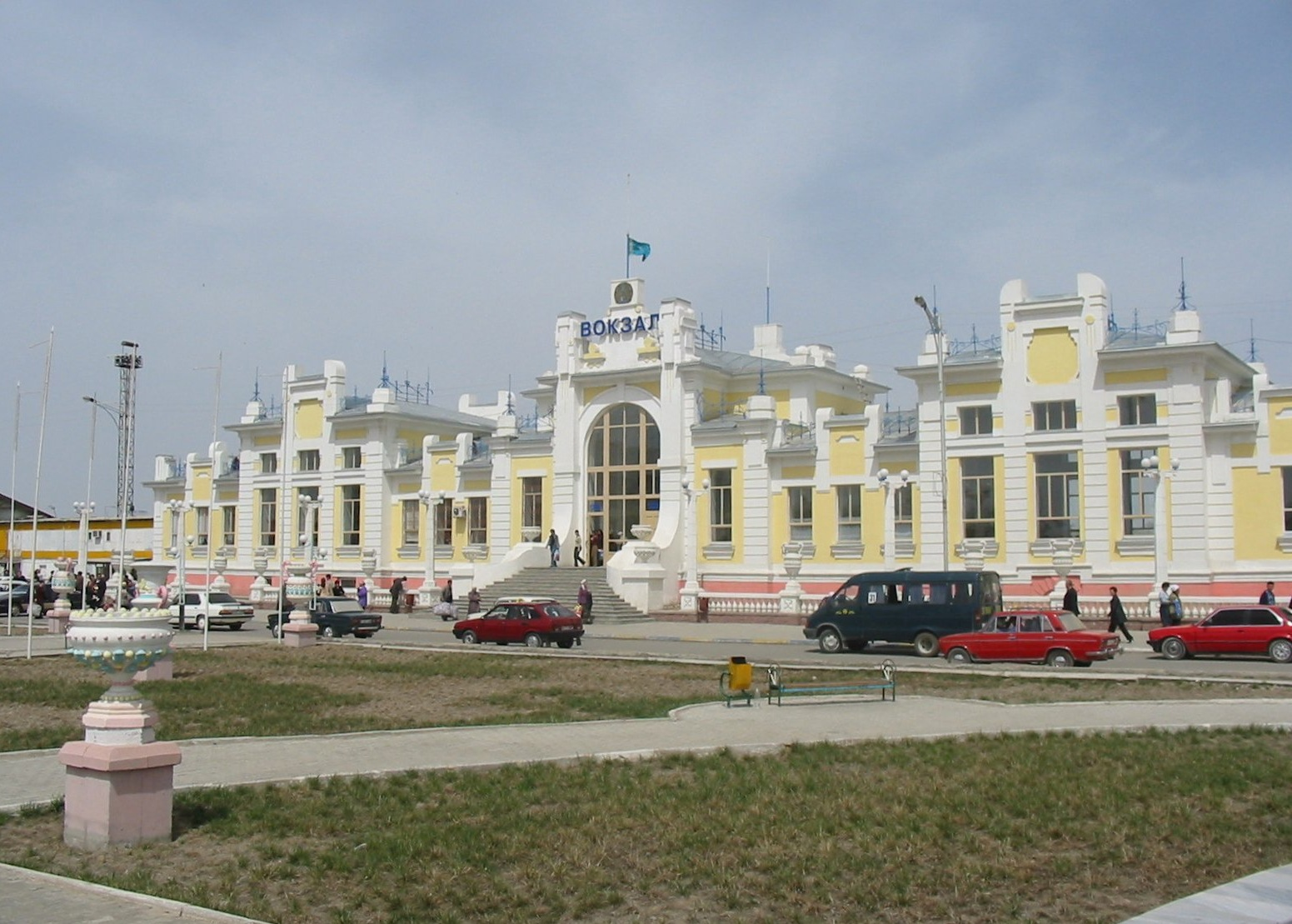
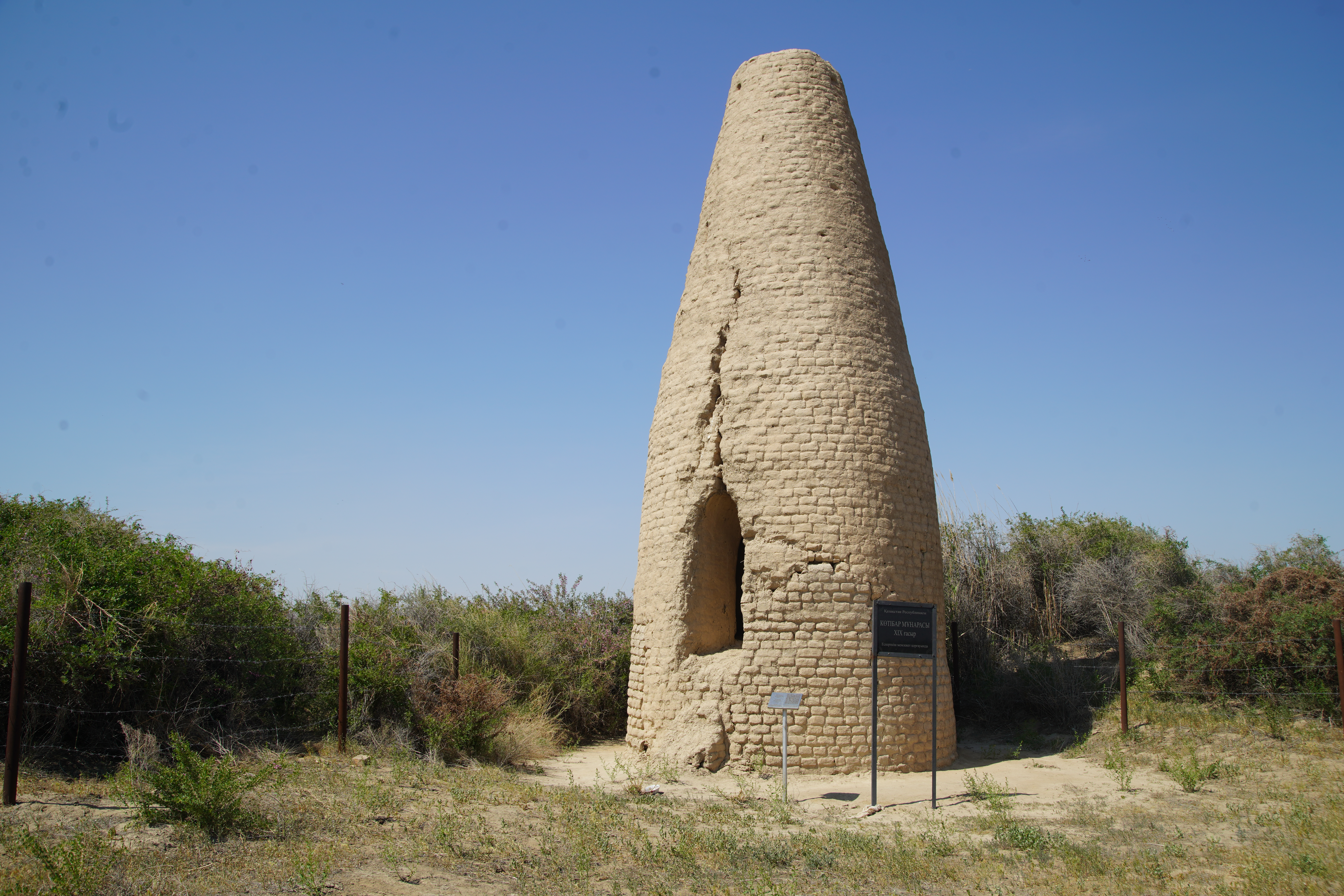
- From the top, Syr Darya River, Qyzylorda, Kotibar Monument The Syr Darya River in Qyzylorda

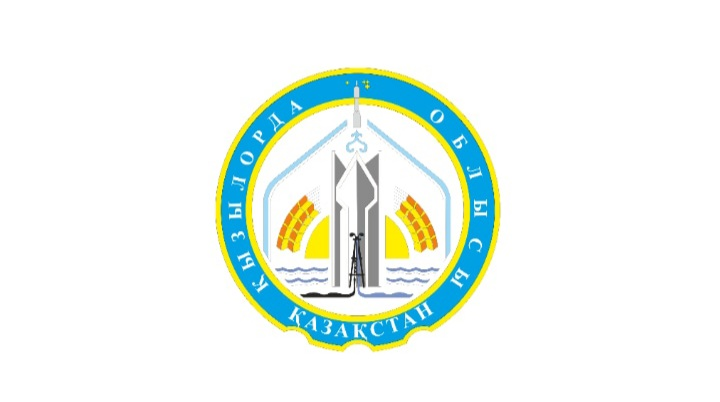
- Flag Coat of arms

- Map of Kazakhstan, location of Kyzylorda Region highlighted
- Coordinates: 45°0′N 64°0′E
- Country: Kazakhstan
- Capital: Qyzylorda

Government
  - Akim: Murat Ergeshbaev

Area
  - Total: 226,019 km^{2} (87,266 sq mi)

Population (2022-01-01)
  - Total: 823,251
  - Density: 3.64240/km^{2} (9.43377/sq mi)

GDP (Nominal, 2024)
  - Total: KZT 2,985 billion (US$ 6.268 billion) · 17th
  - Per capita: KZT 3,536,300 (US$ 7,426)
- Time zone: UTC+5
  - Summer (DST): UTC+5 (not observed)
- Postal codes: 120000
- Area codes: +7 (724)
- ISO 3166 code: KZ-KZY
- Vehicle registration: 11, N
- Districts: 7
- Cities: 2
- Townships: 6
- HDI (2022): 0.785 high · 6th
- Website: www.e-kyzylorda.gov.kz

Qyzylorda Region, (Note: Kazakh: Қызылорда облысы / Qyzylorda oblysy, IPA: [qəˌzəɫorˈdɑ wobɫəˈsə]; Russian: Кызылординская область, romanized: Kyzylordinskaya oblast) formerly known as Kyzyl-Orda Region until 1991, is a region of Kazakhstan. Its capital is the city of Qyzylorda, with a population of 234,736. The region itself has a population of 823,251. Other notable settlements include Aral, Kazaly (Kazalinsk) and the Russian-administered Baikonur, which services the Baikonur Cosmodrome. The total area of the province is 226,000 square kilometers (87,000 sq mi).

== Geography ==
The Qyzylorda Region shares a border with the neighboring country of Uzbekistan. It is bound as well by three other regions of Kazakhstan: Aktobe Region to the west, Ulytau Region to the north and Turkistan Region to the east. The Lesser Barsuki and Aral Karakum deserts are located in the region. The main lakes are Zhaksykylysh, Kamyslybas and Arys. The Syr Darya River, flowing from the Tian Shan mountains to the Aral Sea, passes through Qyzylorda Region.

== Demographics ==
As of 2020, Qyzylorda Region has a population of 803,531.

Due to historical reasons, the percentage of Russians in Qyzylorda Region is the smallest, and the percentage of Kazakhs is the largest among all regions of Kazakhstan. Before the construction of the Baikonur cosmodrome, the region was the only one where there were no places of compact residence of the Russian-speaking population.

Ethnic groups (2020):

- Kazakh: 96.33%
- Russian: 1.80%
- Korean: 0.91%
- Others: 0.96%

== Administrative divisions ==
The region is administratively divided into seven districts and the city of Qyzylorda.

1. Aral District, with the administrative center in the town of Aral;
2. Karmakshy District, with the settlement of Zhosaly;
3. Kazaly District, with the urban-type settlement of Ayteke Bi;
4. Shieli District, with the urban-type settlement of Shieli;
5. Syrdariya District, with the urban-type settlement of Terenozek;
6. Zhalagash District, with the urban-type settlement of Zhalagash;
7. Zhanakorgan District, with the urban-type settlement of Zhanakorgan.

Three localities in Qyzylorda Region have town status. These are Aral, Kazaly, and Qyzylorda. The city of Baikonur is located within the area of the oblast but is currently rented and administered by Russian Federation. Russian legislation is in force in the city, and Russian ruble is used.

== Sport ==
The region sent a bandy team to the Spartakiade 2009.

== Economy ==
In 2021, Kazakh Industry and Infrastructure Development Minister Beibut Atamkulov announced that the country plans to launch glass production in the Qyzylorda region in 2022. The aim is to produce a capacity of 197,100 tons of flat glass each year, with a projection of generating KZT 42.1 billion.

== See also ==
- Barsa-Kelmes Nature Reserve
