= Kazaly District =

Coordinates: 44°51′00″N 61°59′24″E

Kazaly
- District
- Qazaly audani
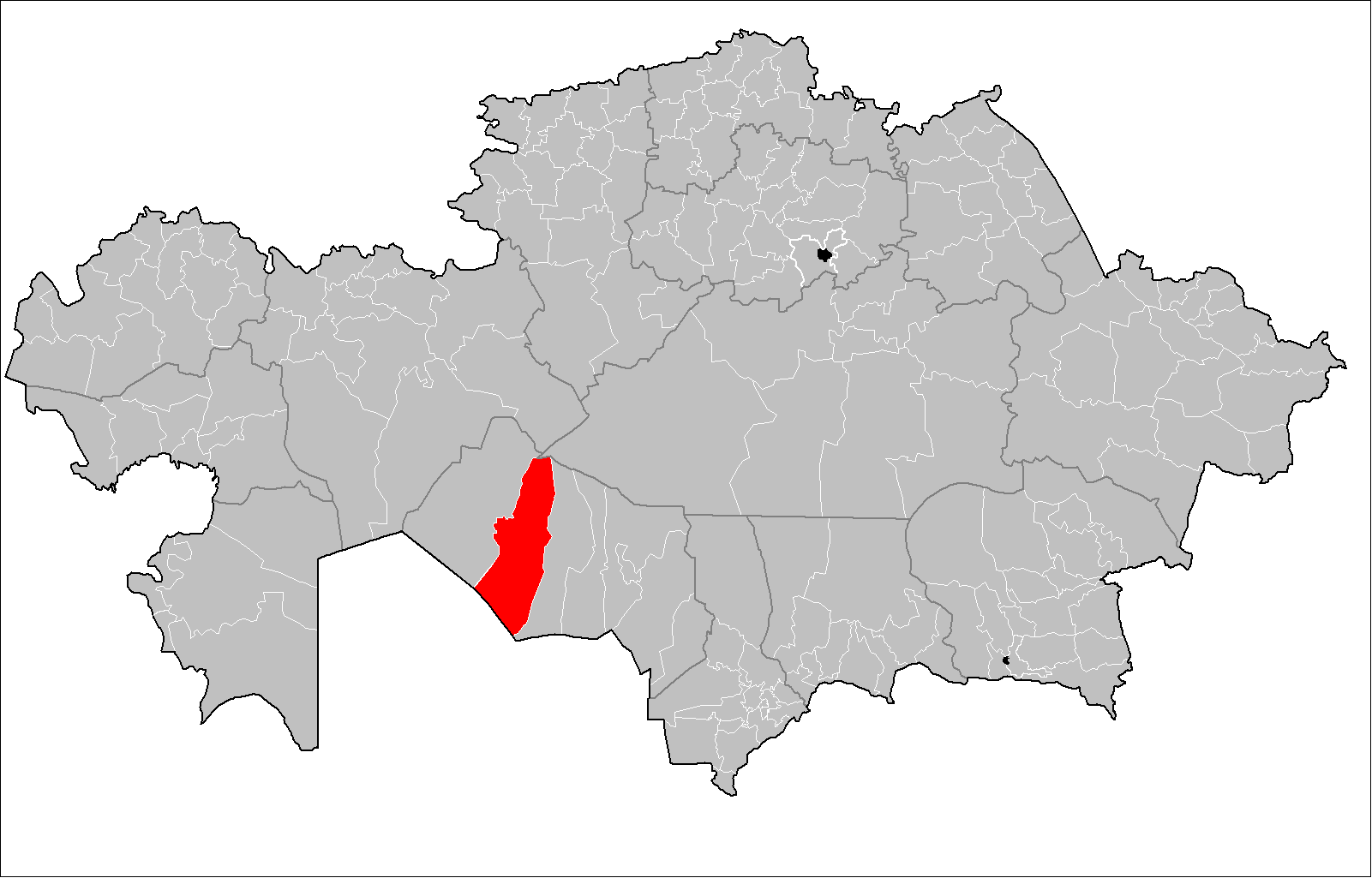
- Country: Kazakhstan
- Region: Kyzylorda Region
- Administrative center: Kazaly

Population (2013)
  - Total: 74,900
- Time zone: UTC+6 (East)

Kazaly (Kazakh: Қазалы ауданы, Qazaly audany) is a district of Kyzylorda Region in southern Kazakhstan. The administrative center of the district is the urban-type settlement of Ayteke Bi. Population: 74,900 (2013 estimate); 72,315 (2009 census results); 68,777 (1999 census results).

== See also ==
- Kazaly, a town in Kazaly district
