= Agimsaly Duzelkhanov =

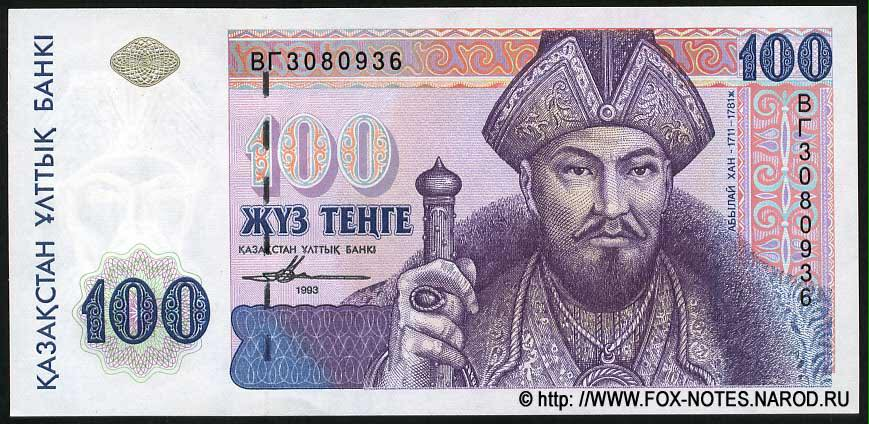
Kazakh 100 Tenge banknote, design by committee including Agimsaly Duzelkhanov

Agimsaly Duzelkhanov (Kazakh: Ағымсалы Дүзелханұлы Дүзелханов, Ağymsaly Düzelhanūly Düzelhanov; born August 19, 1951) is a Kazakhstani artist.

Born in Kazalinsk in Kyzyl-Orda oblast, he graduated from Almaty Art College and Moscow State Institute. He is the winner of international and national exhibitions and contests, and his artwork is on display in presidential palaces of the President of Kazakhstan in Almaty, Astana and in Ashgabat, Turkmenistan. He is also a noted graphic designer and illustrator of books in Kazakhstan and in 1992 was responsible for designing some of the currency bills after independence.
