= Aral District =

Aral
- District
- Арал ауданы
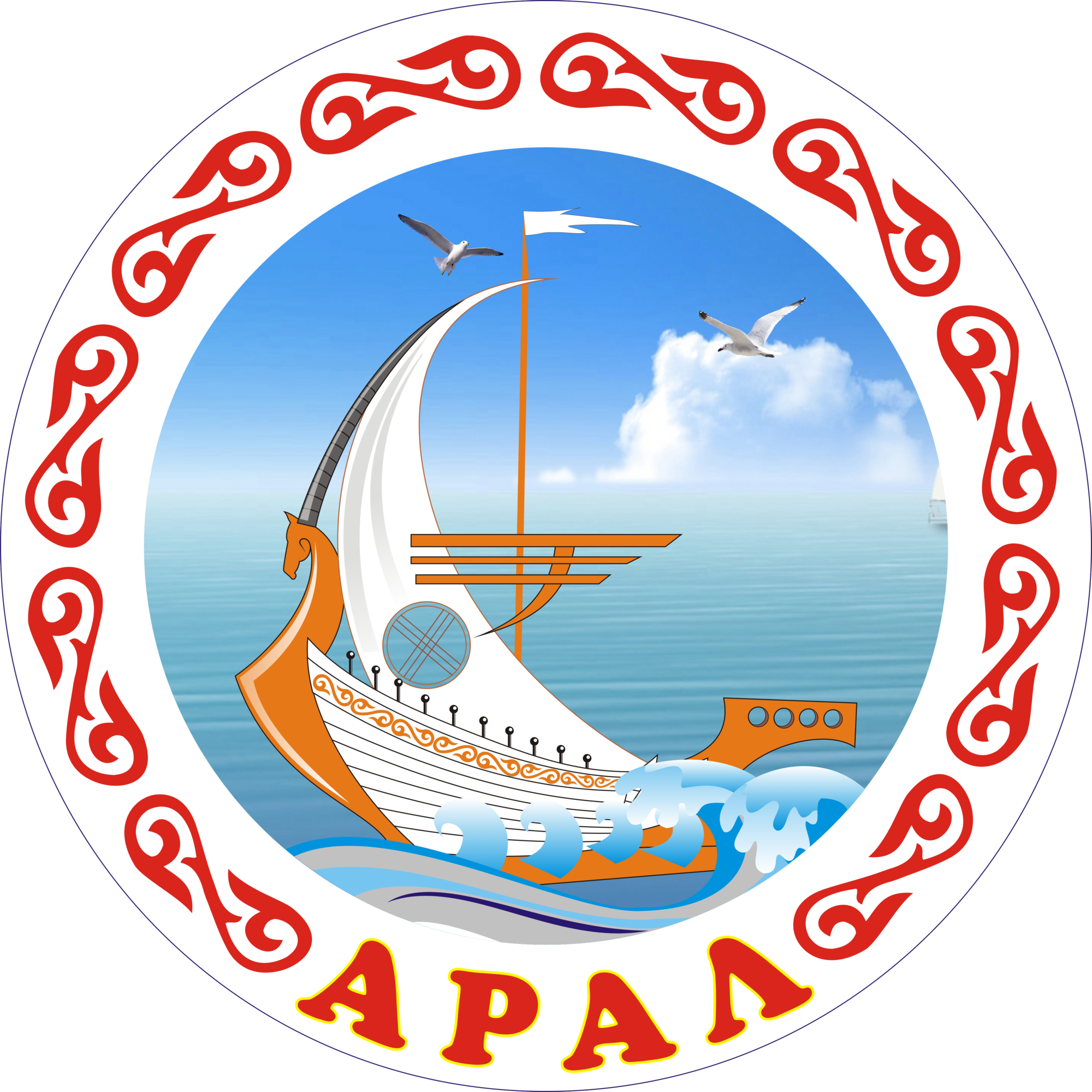
- Coat of arms

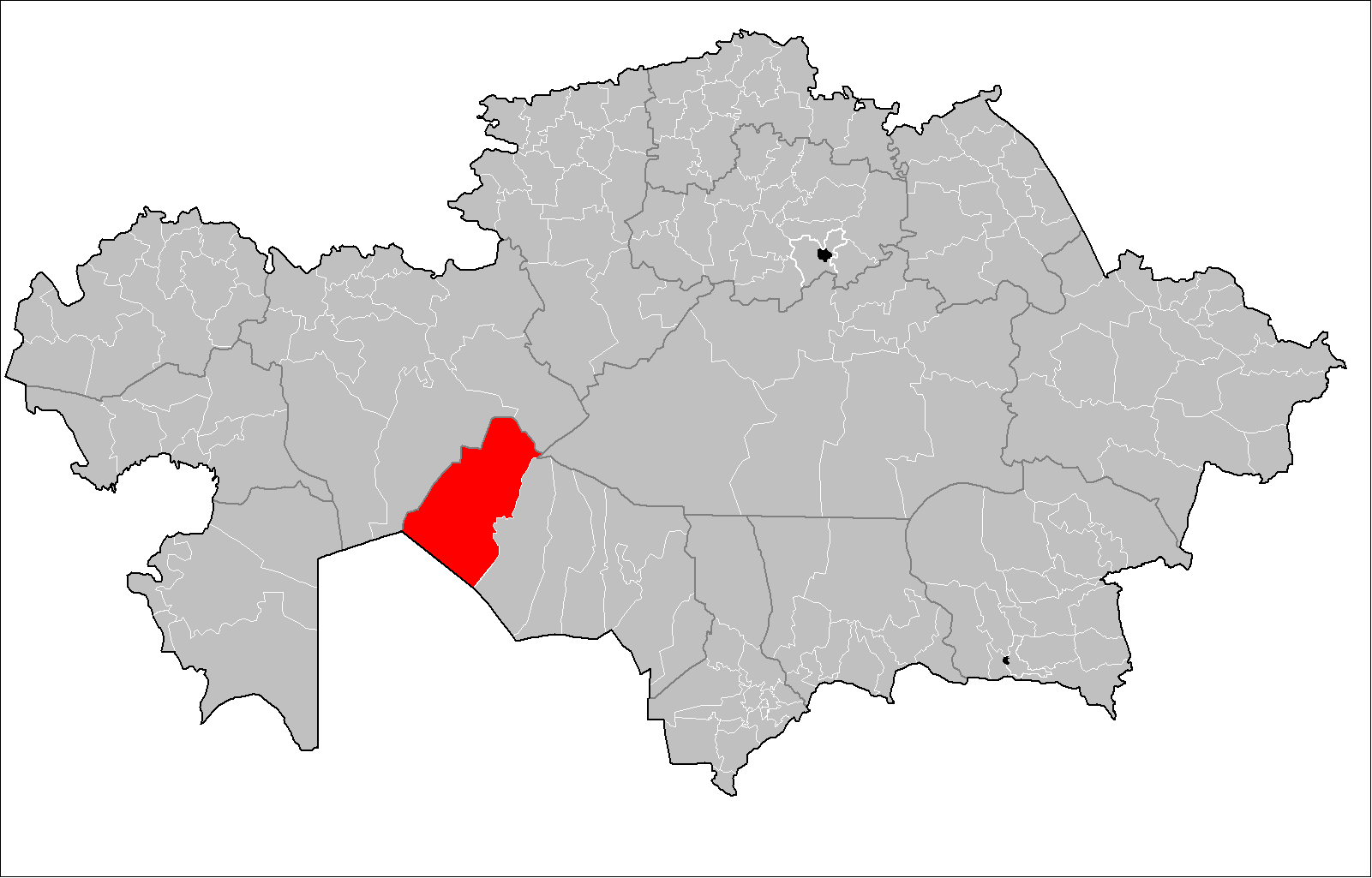
- Coordinates: 46°47′0″N 61°40′0″E
- Country: Kazakhstan
- Region: Kyzylorda Region
- Administrative center: Aral
- Founded: 1938

Government
  - Akim: Sandybaev Murat Mirtaevich

Population (2013)
  - Total: 74,689
- Time zone: UTC+6 (East)

Aral (Kazakh: Арал ауданы, Aral audany, ارال اۋدانى) is a district of Kyzylorda Region in southern Kazakhstan. The administrative center of the district is the town of Aral. Population: 74,689 (2013 estimate); 70,562 (2009 census results); 68,382 (1999 census results).

== Geography ==
Lake Zhaksykylysh lies in the district, about 30 kilometers (19 mi) to the northeast of the Aral Sea.
