= Kazaly =

Kazaly Қазалы
- Town
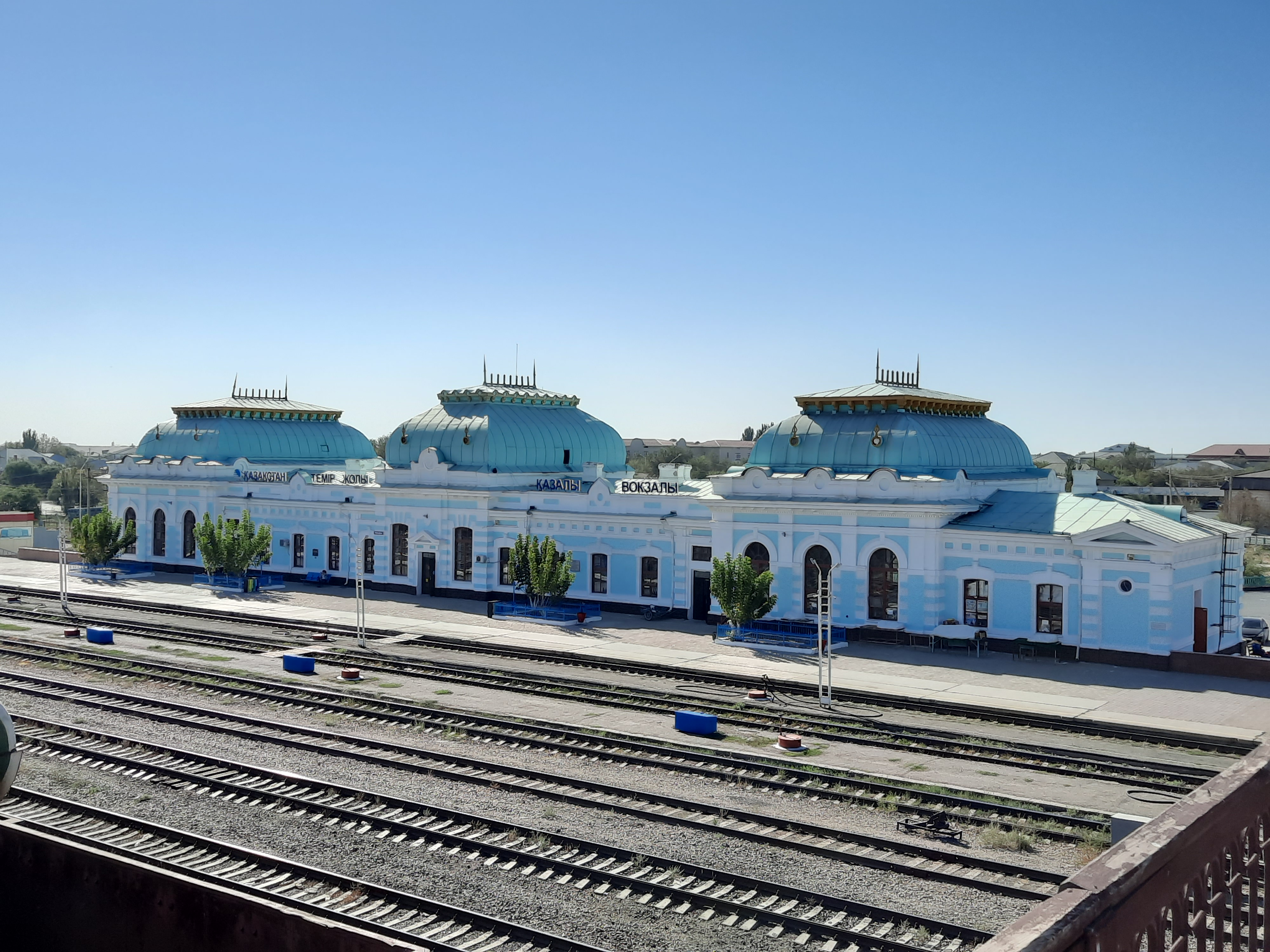

- Location within Kazakhstan
- Coordinates: 45°46′N 62°06′E
- Country: Kazakhstan
- Region: Kyzylorda
- District: Kazaly
- Established: 1853

Population (2009)
  - Total: 7,686

Kazaly (Kazakh: Қазалы, Qazaly), also known as Kazalinsk (Russian: Казалинск) is a town in Kazaly District of Kyzylorda Region in Kazakhstan, located on the right bank of the Syr Darya River. Population: 7,686 (2009 census results); 7,298 (1999 census results).

It is a closed area and for travelers, a special permission is required to visit the town.

== History ==
During the Russian conquest of Central Asia, Kazalinsk was founded in 1853 as a fort and granted town status in 1867.

According to Eugene Schuyler, it was located "at the junction of all the trade routes in Central Asia, as the road from Orenburg meets here with the Khiva, Bokhara and Tashkent roads."

== Climate ==
Kazaly has a cold desert climate (BWk) according to the Köppen climate classification.

Climate data for Kazaly (1991–2020, extremes 1855–present)
Month	Jan	Feb	Mar	Apr	May	Jun	Jul	Aug	Sep	Oct	Nov	Dec	Year
Record high °C (°F)	12.0 (53.6)	21.1 (70.0)	31.0 (87.8)	36.6 (97.9)	41.6 (106.9)	43.6 (110.5)	45.2 (113.4)	43.4 (110.1)	41.7 (107.1)	34.1 (93.4)	26.3 (79.3)	14.0 (57.2)	44.5 (112.1)
Mean daily maximum °C (°F)	−4.9 (23.2)	−2.3 (27.9)	7.8 (46.0)	19.1 (66.4)	26.7 (80.1)	32.0 (89.6)	33.5 (92.3)	31.8 (89.2)	25.2 (77.4)	16.7 (62.1)	5.3 (41.5)	−2.4 (27.7)	15.7 (60.3)
Daily mean °C (°F)	−8.9 (16.0)	−7.2 (19.0)	2.0 (35.6)	12.5 (54.5)	20.0 (68.0)	25.4 (77.7)	26.9 (80.4)	24.7 (76.5)	17.5 (63.5)	9.3 (48.7)	0.2 (32.4)	−6.5 (20.3)	9.7 (49.5)
Mean daily minimum °C (°F)	−12.8 (9.0)	−11.7 (10.9)	−3.1 (26.4)	5.9 (42.6)	12.8 (55.0)	17.8 (64.0)	19.5 (67.1)	17.3 (63.1)	10.4 (50.7)	2.8 (37.0)	−4.3 (24.3)	−10.2 (13.6)	3.7 (38.7)
Record low °C (°F)	−39.0 (−38.2)	−36.1 (−33.0)	−30.0 (−22.0)	−12.2 (10.0)	−1.7 (28.9)	3.0 (37.4)	7.8 (46.0)	5.0 (41.0)	−3.2 (26.2)	−13.4 (7.9)	−32.2 (−26.0)	−41.1 (−42.0)	−41.1 (−42.0)
Average precipitation mm (inches)	12.9 (0.51)	11.0 (0.43)	14.3 (0.56)	19.3 (0.76)	14.0 (0.55)	7.5 (0.30)	6.2 (0.24)	5.5 (0.22)	2.9 (0.11)	9.1 (0.36)	13.1 (0.52)	14.1 (0.56)	130.0 (5.12)
Average precipitation days (≥ 1.0 mm)	3.2	2.5	3.1	2.9	2.9	1.8	1.0	0.9	0.9	1.9	3.2	3.8	28.1
Average relative humidity (%)	79	75	73	53	44	40	41	42	48	60	75	80	59
Mean monthly sunshine hours	123	158	192	254	338	374	390	369	301	220	137	105	2,961
Source 1: Pogoda.ru.net
Source 2: NOAA (sun, 1961–1990), Deutscher Wetterdienst (humidity 1973-1993)

== Notable people ==
- Agimsaly Duzelkhanov (1951-) – artist
- Roza Baglanova (1922–2011) – Soprano opera and pop vocalist
